= San Ysidro, San Diego =

- Community of San Diego
- San Ysidro
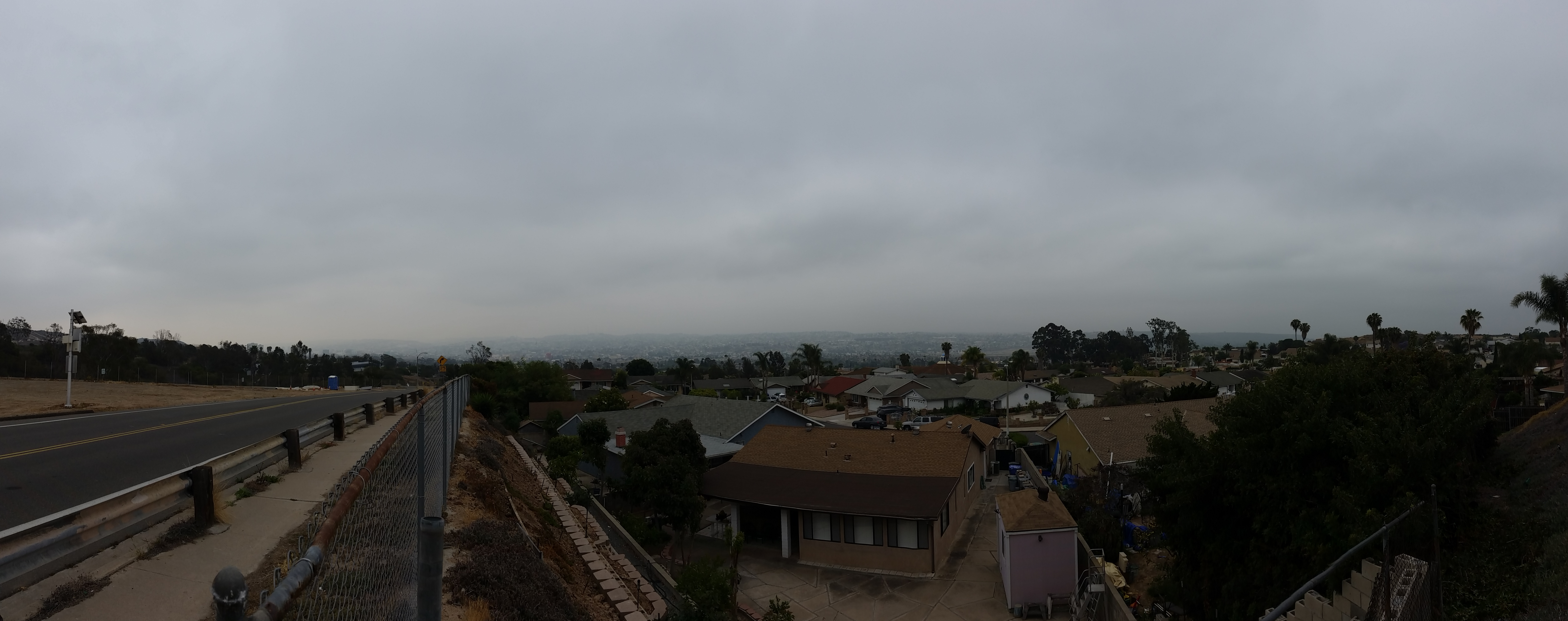
- San Ysidro seen from south of California State Route 905

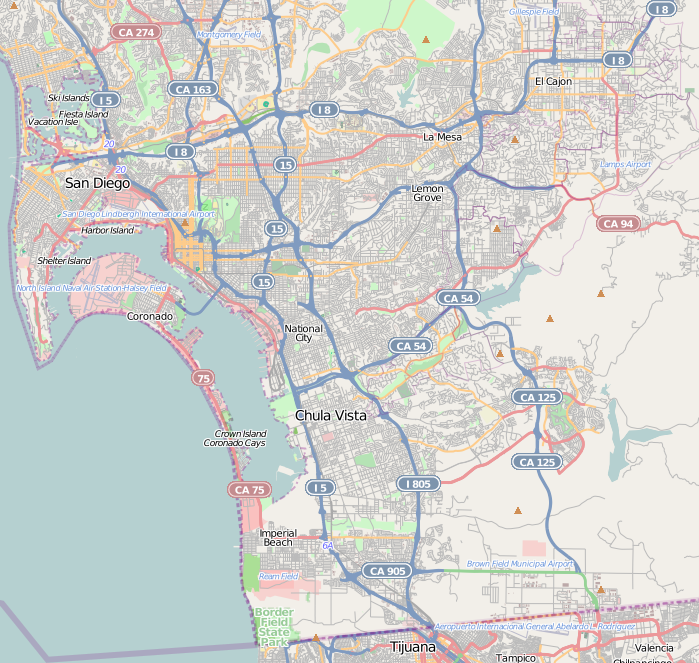
- Location within Southern San Diego
- Coordinates: 32.5549°N 117.044306°W
- Country: United States of America
- State: California
- County: San Diego
- City: San Diego

Population (2010)
  - Total: 28,008
- ZIP code: 92173

San Ysidro (Californio Spanish for 'St. Isidore', Spanish pronunciation: [san iˈsiðɾo]) is a district of San Diego, California, immediately north of the Mexico–United States border. It neighbors Otay Mesa West to the north, Otay Mesa to the east, and Nestor and the Tijuana River Valley to the west; together these communities form South San Diego, a practical exclave of the City of San Diego. Major thoroughfares include Beyer Boulevard and San Ysidro Boulevard.

== History ==
=== 1829–1848: Rancho Tía Juana ===
After independence from Spain in 1822, the Mexican government started issuing land grants for ranchos. In 1829 it granted Santiago Argüello Moraga the 10,000-acre Rancho Tía Juana, which covered parts of what now are San Ysidro and Tijuana; his son Emigdio Argüello was granted the adjacent Rancho Melijo in 1833, on which they built "La Punta", an adobe house that was one of very few structures in the area until the late 1800s.

=== 1848–1922: Early U.S. period ===
After the 1846 Mexican–American War, Mexico ceded what is now the Southwest U.S. in 1848. San Ysidro found itself on an international border. The border was marked in the mid-1860s and the first customs building was erected in 1873. The border was unfenced until one was built in 1910 from the Pacific Ocean to Otay Mountain.

==== 1887–1895: Tia Juana City ====
San Diego was connected to the U.S. railroad network in 1885, spurring a real estate boom. In 1887, real estate firm Hart and Stern developed Tia Juana City on the site of today's Las Americas Premium Outlets, consisting of a single street with a drug store, saloon, hotel and boot shop and some scattered houses beyond. Floods washed out buildings in 1891 and 1895; Tia Juana City was not immediately rebuilt and settlers moved to higher ground.

==== 1908–1916: Little Landers ====
The Little Landers colony was a community founded by William Ellsworth Smythe in 1908 with the motto, "A little land and a living surely is better than desperate struggle and wealth possibly." Each member of the community held a plot of land no bigger than they could cultivate themselves, averaging 2 acres (8,100 m^{2}) each, in order to foster a non-hierarchical social structure. Every person had an equal voice in the affairs of the community whose business affairs was conducted by a board of directors voted in by the community. All agricultural buying and selling was pooled on a cooperative basis. Members agreed to forfeit their land should they leave the community.

The city levied a commission on the sale of land which funded public improvements such as a library, park, irrigation systems, and a clubhouse. They maintained a retail market in San Diego where harvested produce was sold. In addition to growing vegetables, the community raised and marketed ducks, rabbits, and goats.

The Little Landers community is known as one of the nation's first communes. It lasted until a major flood wiped out its farms in 1916. The George Belcher homestead is the oldest surviving building in San Ysidro.

George Smythe named the new settlement San Ysidro, the archaic spelling of Saint Isidore the Laborer's name in Spanish (San Isidro).

=== 1922–1957: Residential community and border town ===
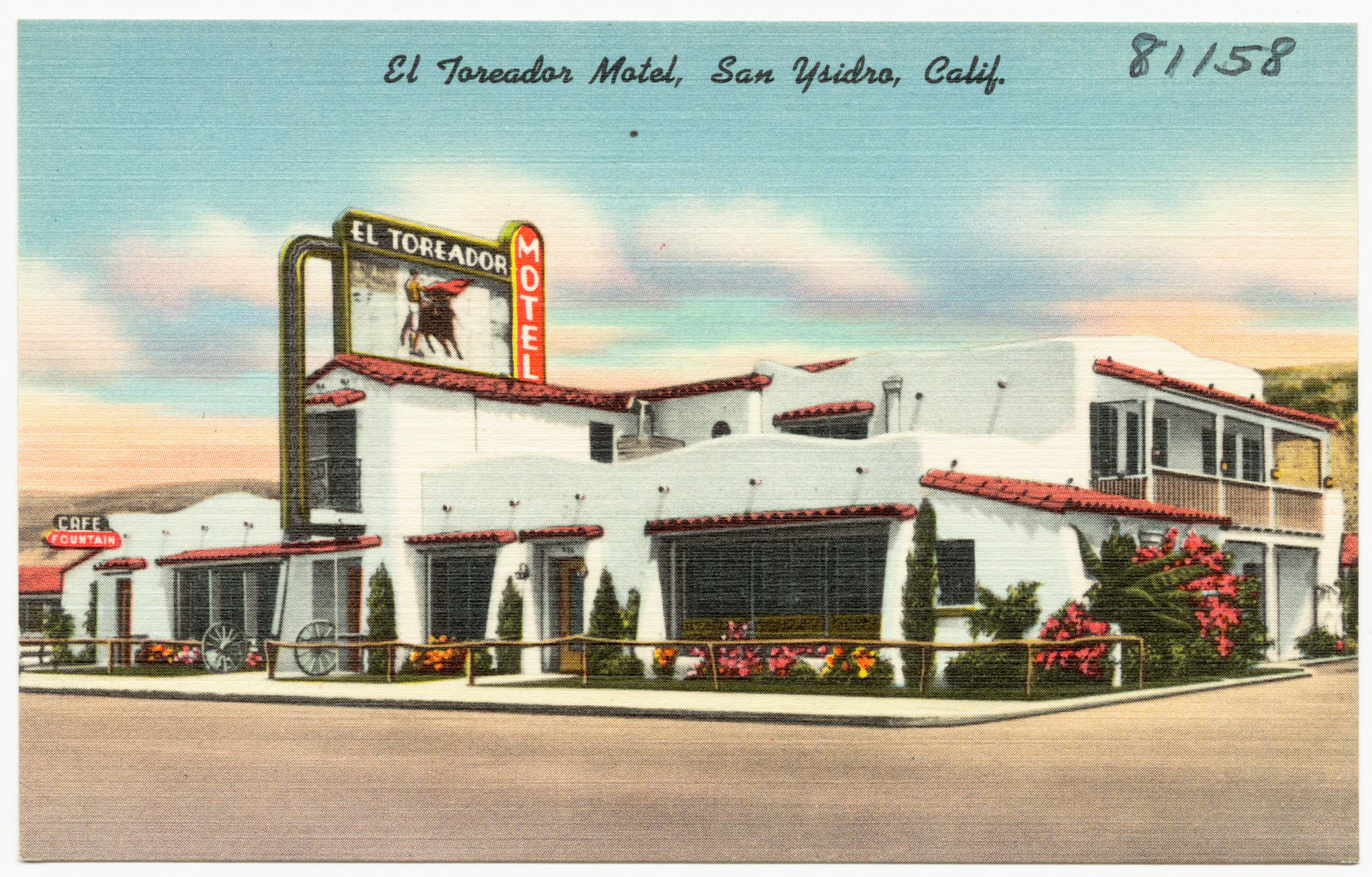
El Toreador Motel

With the rise of Tijuana, Mexico as a racing, gambling, drinking and entertainment destination in the 1920s, many American employees of these establishments lived in San Ysidro and worked in Tijuana. By 1922, twenty new modest homes had been built in San Ysidro for working class residents, "Some [of whom worked for the]... Tijuana’s Lower California Jockey Club racetrack... others worked in Mexican saloons and gambling halls."

In 1924, the $12,000 San Ysidro Free Public Library opened; civic leader Frank Beyer donated the land as well as $7,000 towards the cost. The Louis Gill-designed San Ysidro Community Church opened in 1924, and the Our Lady of Mount Carmel Catholic Church opened a few years later. The San Ysidro Bank and the Civic and Recreation Center opened in 1925. Beyer donated the land for the Civic Center. In 1931, the old customs facility was replaced with the existing historic landmark customs building.

After 1933, with alcohol legalized in the U.S., gambling outlawed in Mexico and fewer American visitors to Tijuana, some homes were purchased by Mexican citizens working in the U.S.

Following World War Two, there was a housing shortage in San Diego and as a result, new houses, apartment buildings and bungalow courts were built in San Ysidro.

According to the San Diego city planning department, at this point San Ysidro was "now a full- fledged city that supported the various economic, social, religious, and recreational needs of the residents and visitors."

=== 1957–present: Part of San Diego ===
==== Annexation ====
San Ysidro, along with the rest of South San Diego, was annexed by the city of San Diego in 1957; an attempt by residents in 1973 to reverse the decision was unsuccessful.

==== 1984 McDonald's shooting ====
On July 18, 1984, James Oliver Huberty, a 41-year-old former welder from Canton, Ohio, opened fire inside a McDonald's restaurant with multiple firearms (including an Uzi), killing 21 people and injuring an additional 19 people, before he was fatally shot by a sniper from a SWAT team. The McDonald's site was razed in 1985. The site is now home to a Southwestern College satellite campus. It was the deadliest mass shooting in U.S. history until the 1991 Luby's massacre in Texas, and remains the deadliest in California history.

== Climate ==
Climate data for San Ysidro, San Diego
Month	Jan	Feb	Mar	Apr	May	Jun	Jul	Aug	Sep	Oct	Nov	Dec	Year
Record high °F (°C)	89 (32)	96 (36)	95 (35)	99 (37)	102 (39)	112 (44)	109 (43)	108 (42)	111 (44)	103 (39)	98 (37)	89 (32)	112 (44)
Mean daily maximum °F (°C)	68 (20)	68 (20)	70 (21)	71 (22)	73 (23)	77 (25)	81 (27)	83 (28)	82 (28)	78 (26)	73 (23)	68 (20)	74 (23)
Mean daily minimum °F (°C)	45 (7)	47 (8)	49 (9)	52 (11)	56 (13)	59 (15)	63 (17)	64 (18)	63 (17)	57 (14)	49 (9)	45 (7)	54 (12)
Record low °F (°C)	22 (−6)	24 (−4)	29 (−2)	35 (2)	39 (4)	42 (6)	48 (9)	50 (10)	44 (7)	30 (−1)	28 (−2)	22 (−6)	22 (−6)
Average precipitation inches (mm)	2.56 (65)	2.33 (59)	2.50 (64)	0.86 (22)	0.24 (6.1)	0.09 (2.3)	0.03 (0.76)	0.11 (2.8)	0.28 (7.1)	0.47 (12)	1.22 (31)	1.40 (36)	12.09 (307)

== Border crossing ==
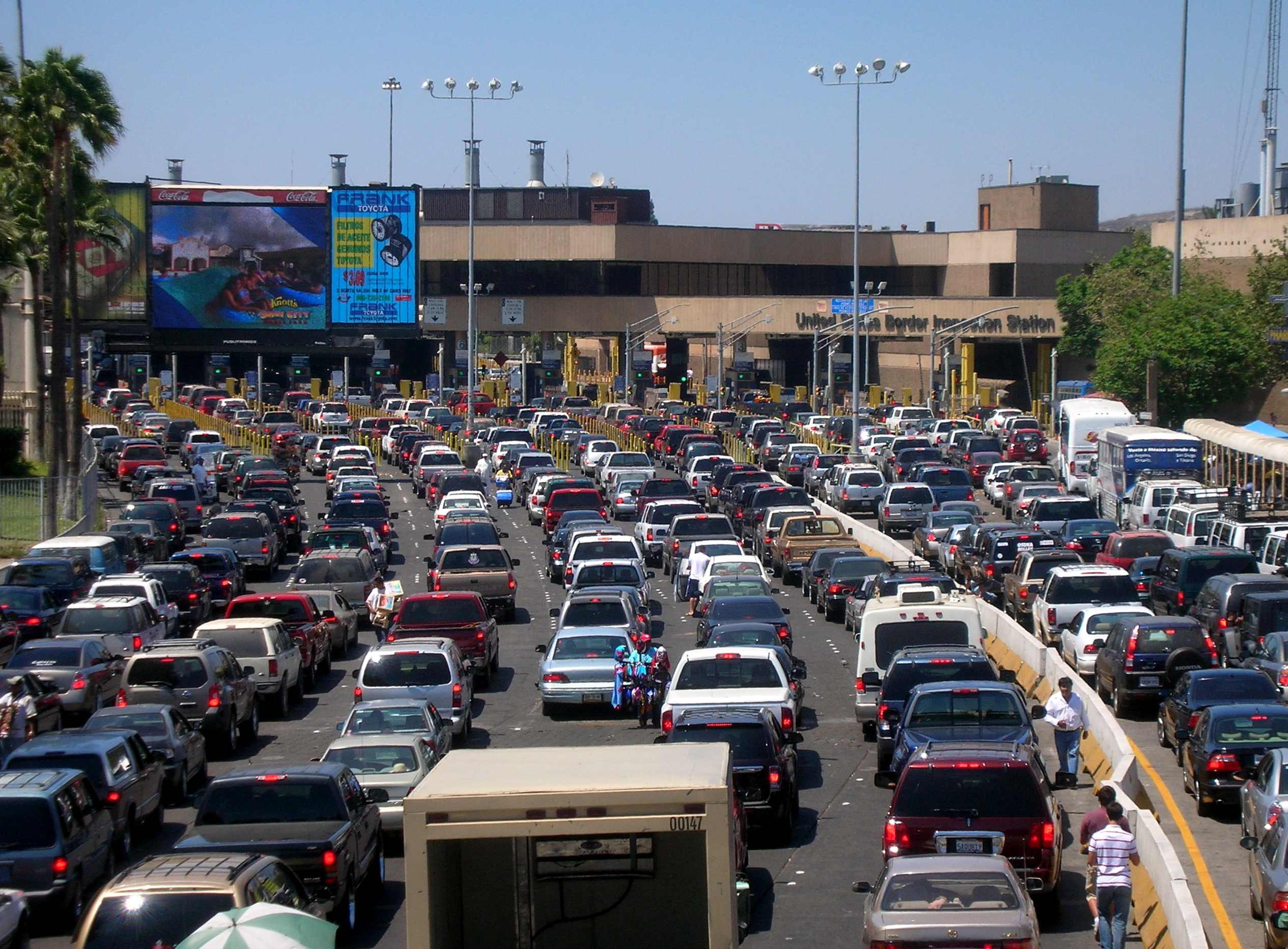
Traffic in Tijuana, Mexico waiting at the San Ysidro port of entry into the United States.

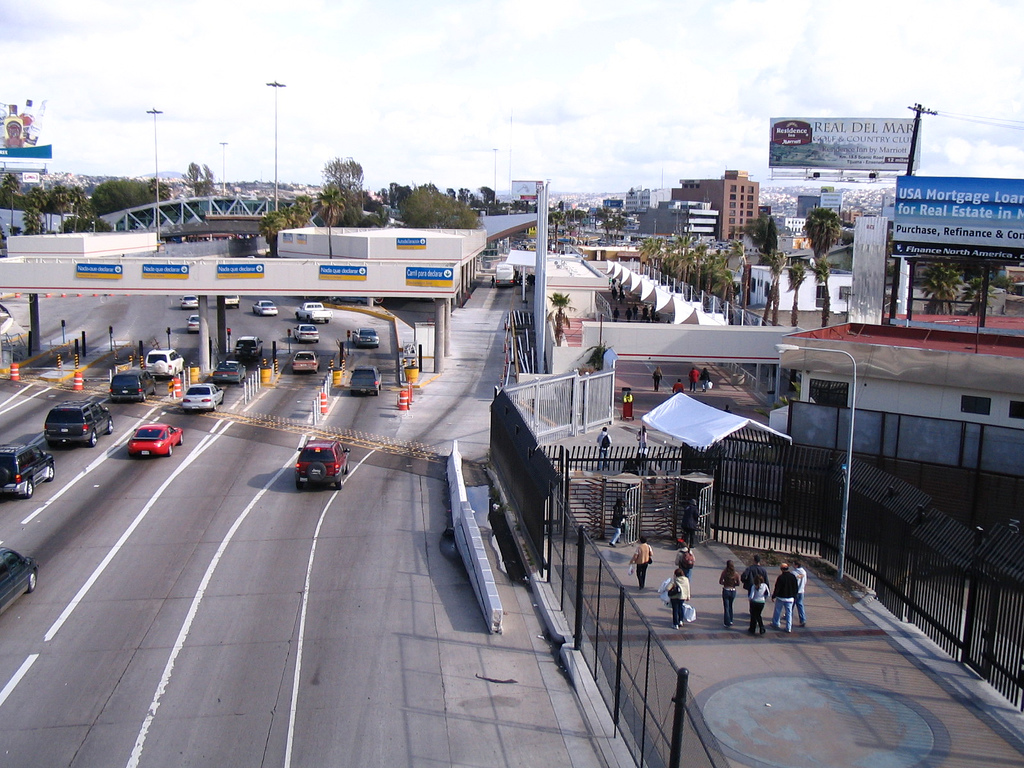
Cars and pedestrians in San Ysidro entering Mexico.

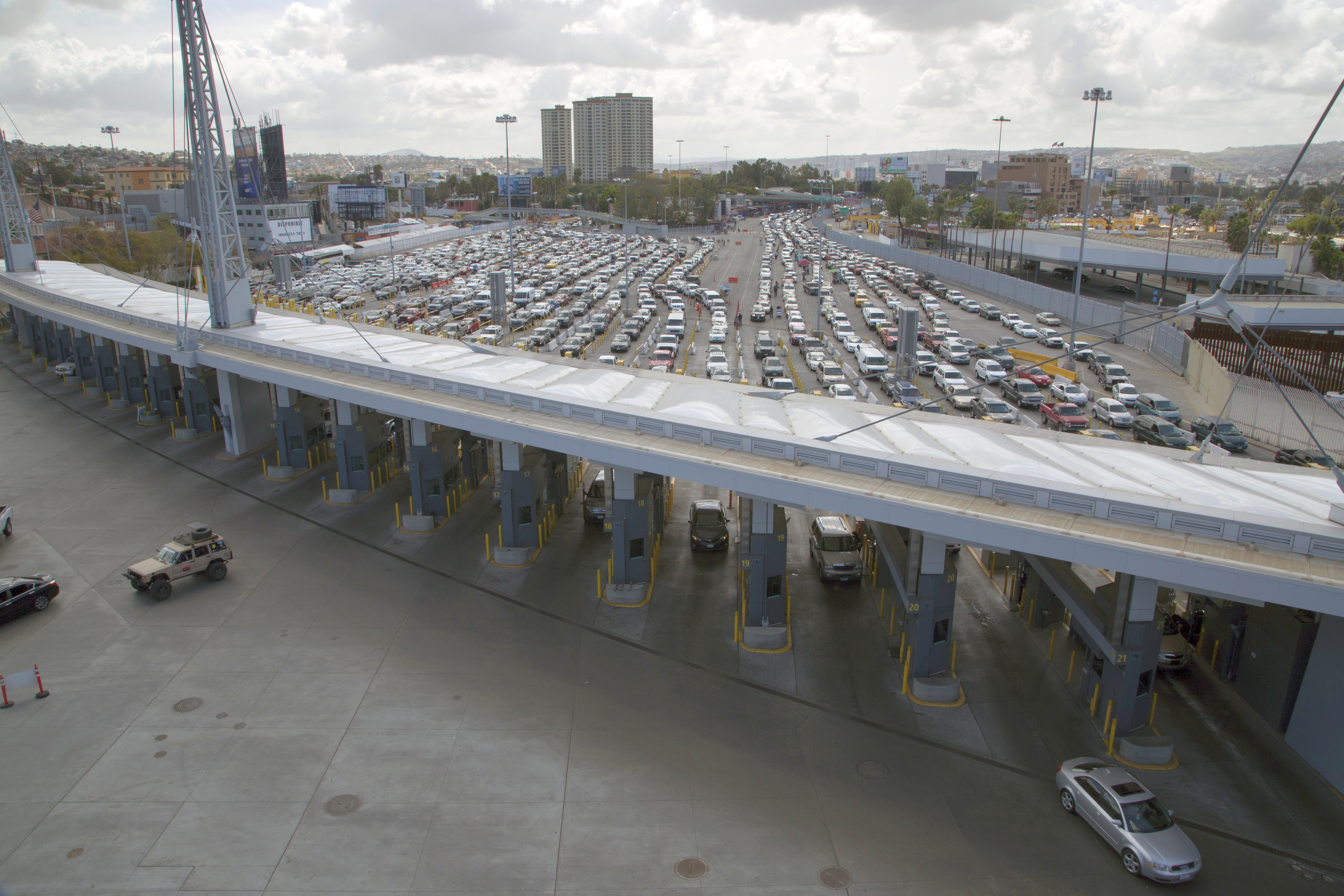
Aerial view of traffic at the United States-Mexico border.

San Ysidro is home to the fourth busiest land border crossing in the world. It is the second-busiest border crossing between two sovereign nations (after the Johor–Singapore Causeway) and the busiest border crossing in the Western Hemisphere.

Statistics from the U.S. Department of Transportation state more than 15 million vehicles and 36.7 million people entered the United States at the San Ysidro Port of Entry in 2019. The great majority of these are workers (both of Mexican and U.S. nationality) commuting from Tijuana to jobs in the greater San Diego area and throughout southern California. There is also reverse traffic, both of workers traveling to maquiladoras in Mexico and those purchasing services or seeking entertainment in Tijuana. 2009 studies estimated that wait times for vehicles at the San Ysidro LPOE averaged 1.5 to 2 hours during the commuter peak period.

For pedestrians, in 2012, morning waits to enter the United States could last more than two hours — and twice that time during peak weekend periods. Roughly one-fifth of the 25,000 daily northbound crossers remained in San Ysidro to work, shop, visit family etc., according to the San Ysidro Chamber of Commerce. Many more boarded the San Diego Trolley or other public transportation to work, schools, stores, banks, medical appointments and family gatherings across San Diego County. In 2016 a second pedestrian crossing was opened, "PedWest", connecting Plaza Viva Tijuana via a walkway to the border next to the El Chaparral auto crossing, with Virginia Avenue in San Ysidro.

San Ysidro is also where ICE deports the most Mexicans back into Mexico; in 2003, this was 360,172 people.

Trucks cannot use the San Ysidro crossing and must use the Otay Mesa Port of Entry instead.

An expansion of the San Ysidro Port of Entry took place in three parts and was completed in 2019. The $741 million project expanded and veered Interstate 5 to the west. A new northbound inspection facility was built, including primary vehicle inspection booths, a secondary inspection area, an administration space, and a pedestrian-processing facility. A southbound inspection facility exists on the southbound crossing, operated by Mexican customs in Tijuana.

== Demographics ==
The 2010 census counted 28,008 people in San Ysidro, of whom 93% were Hispanic.

Of those over 5 years old, 60% spoke Spanish and English "well" or "very well". 13% only spoke Spanish, and 10% spoke only English.

== Emergency services ==
=== Police ===
The San Diego Police Department provides police services to the community. The area is serviced by the southern division headquarters at 1120 27th Street and a small substation at 663 E. San Ysidro Blvd.

=== Fire and EMS ===
The San Diego Fire Department provides fire and emergency medical services to the community. The area is serviced by fire station 29 at 179 W. San Ysidro Blvd.

== Education ==
=== Schools ===
The area is served by the San Ysidro School District (kindergarten through the eighth grade) and Sweetwater Union High School District.

The high school district operates San Ysidro High School, which serves much of San Ysidro. Portions are zoned to Southwest Senior High School, with some rezoned from San Ysidro to Southwest in 2016. A small section of San Ysidro is zoned to Montgomery High School. San Ysidro Adult Education Center, operated by the high school district, is also in San Ysidro.

== Landmarks and facilities ==
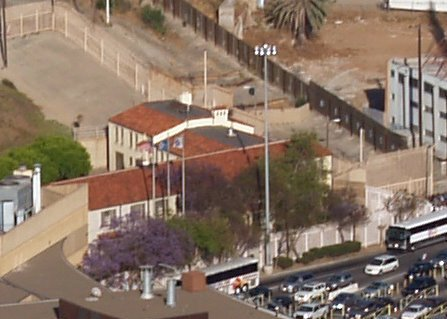
Old Customs House at the international border

The San Diego Public Library operates the San Ysidro Branch Library. Parks in San Ysidro include Howard Lane Park, Vista Terrace Park, and San Ysidro Community Park. Churches include Our Lady of Mount Carmel Roman Catholic Church.

The San Ysidro Post Office opened on April 13, 1910, and closed on January 5, 1974. It has moved to a new location on W. San Ysidro Blvd. and continues providing service today.

The San Ysidro U.S. Inspection Station/U.S. Custom House is listed on the National Register of Historic Places.

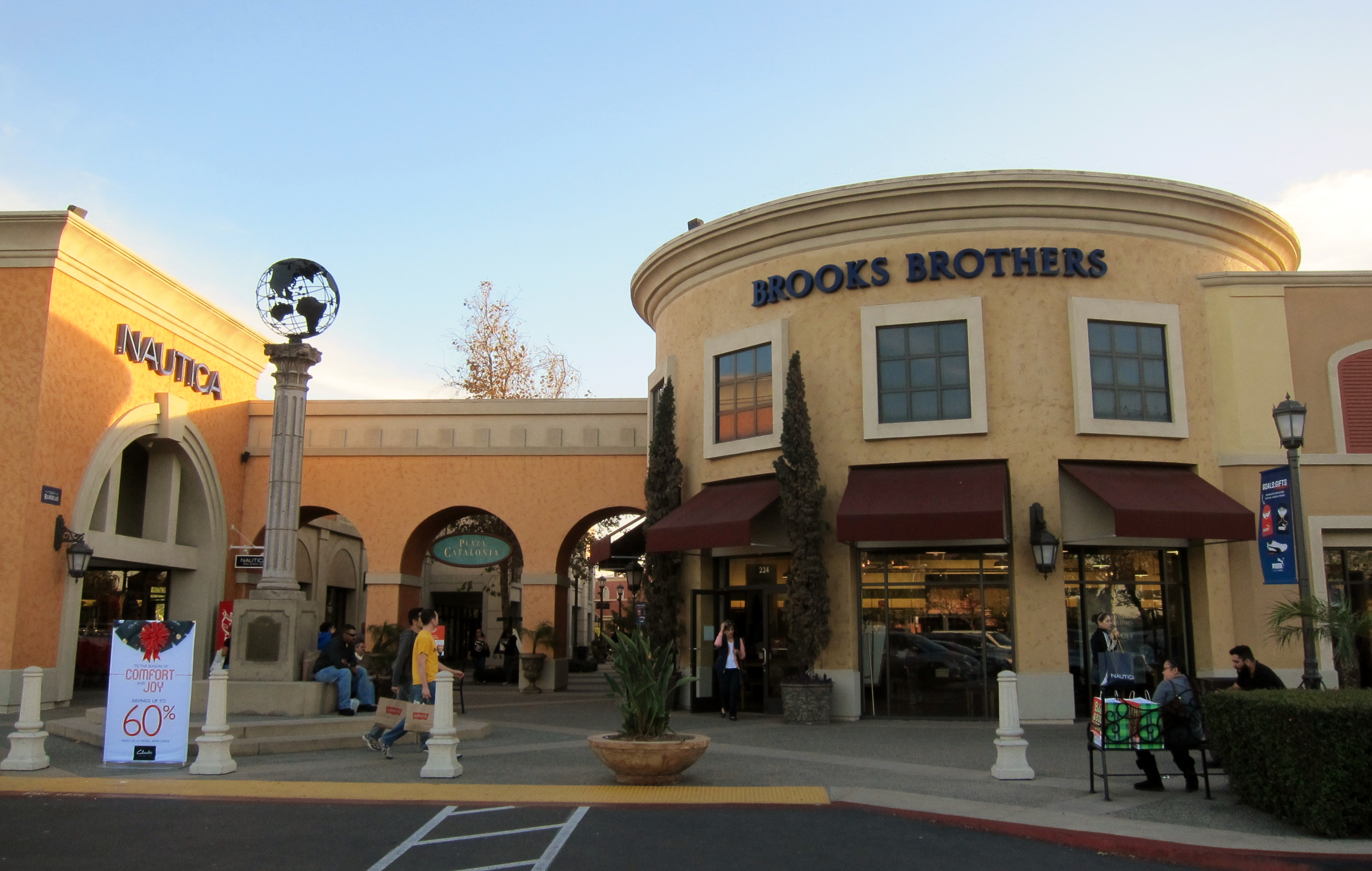
Las Américas outlet mall

San Diego's largest outlet mall is on the international border immediately west of the crossing, Las Americas Premium Outlets, with 125 stores.

Noted architect Louis John Gill designed the Spanish Revival-style building at 147 W. San Ysidro Blvd., formerly the San Ysidro Commercial Company, (1929) now TheFront art gallery.

== Transport ==
There is a trolley line as part of the San Diego Metro, the Blue line which goes to the border.

California State Route 905 is also here, so is I-5 and I-805.

== See also ==
- San Diego–Tijuana metropolitan area
- San Ysidro Land Port of Entry Expansion Project
