= Wright Tower =

Office building in Louisville, Kentucky

Coordinates: 38°13′41.9″N 85°38′21.6″W

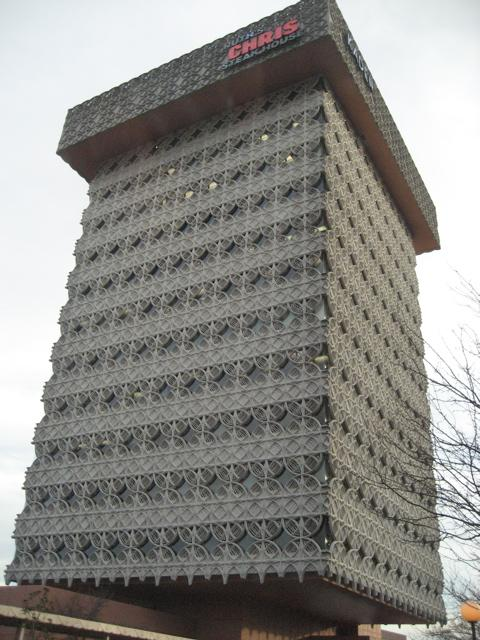

General information
- Type: Commercial
- Architectural style: Modernism
- Location: 6100 Dutchmans Lane, Louisville, Kentucky, United States
- Construction started: 1965
- Completed: 1966

Height
- Roof: 196 ft (60 m)

Technical details
- Floor count: 16
- Floor area: 115,530 ft^{2} (10,733 m^{2})

Design and construction
- Architect: Taliesin Associated Architects
- Main contractor: Robert E. McKee General Contractor

Wright Tower (formerly known as Kaden Tower) is a 15-story office building at 6100 Dutchmans Lane in suburban Louisville, Kentucky. The building opened in 1966 as the headquarters for Lincoln Income Life Insurance Company and was originally named Lincoln Tower. Designed by William Wesley Peters, a student of Frank Lloyd Wright, the building is notable for its cantilevered structure and its suspended lacework facade. A single-story building on the same site and in the same architectural style adjoins the tower. This smaller building which originally housed a branch office of Liberty National Bank and Trust Company is now leased by WBKI-TV. In September 2023, it was renamed to Wright Tower to reflect the historical influence of Frank Lloyd Wright.

== Design ==
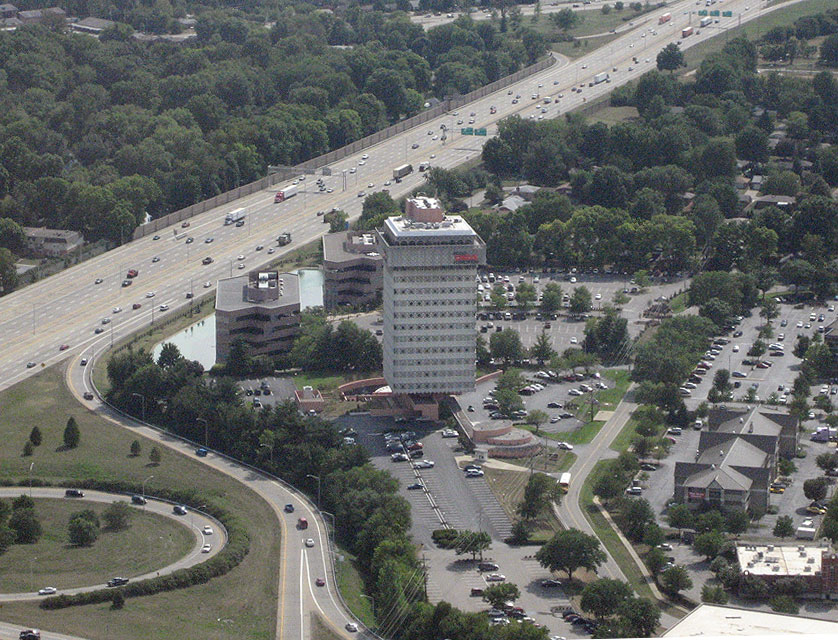
Aerial photo of Wright Tower in its suburban Louisville context, showing its cantilever base. It is located next to an on-ramp of the Watterson Expressway.

Both buildings' designs are often attributed to Frank Lloyd Wright, but they were actually designed by Wright's protégé and son-in-law William Wesley Peters. Wright's widow, Olgivanna Lloyd Wright, is also cited as an influence. Peters became the head of Wright's architectural firm Taliesin Associated Architects after Wright's death in 1959.

Though Peters had his own style, he collaborated with Wright for more than twenty years. He based the design of the Louisville complex largely on three of Wright's projects, only one of which was actually built. Like the Wright Tower, Wright's never-constructed 1946 sketches for the Sarabhai Calico Mills Store in Ahmedabad, India, had grillwork over the outside windows, a feature that evokes the jali of traditional Mughal architecture. This feature served the dual role of reducing interior solar heat gain while preserving views from interior to exterior (though traditionally jalis also permitted ventilation). Even though Louisville's humid sub-tropical climate has much lower temperatures throughout the year than Ahmedabad's hot semi-arid climate, the exterior cladding still functions as a solar shading device. Peters' design is also evocative of another unbuilt Wright plan, the 40-story Rogers Lacy Hotel. This striking, innovative skyscraper had been commissioned also in 1946 for downtown Dallas, Texas, by oil tycoon Rogers Lacy but was never built due to his untimely death.

Undoubtedly, the one Wright blueprint that Peters incorporated as his biggest source of inspiration was the H.C. Price Company Tower in Bartlesville, Oklahoma. The Price Tower, commissioned in 1952 by another oil businessman, Harold C. Price, opened in 1956 and is one of only two completed tall buildings designed by Frank Lloyd Wright (the other being the Johnson Wax Headquarters Research Tower in Racine, Wisconsin). Peters was a collaborator with Wright on the Price Tower project, so it is not surprising that the Wright and Price buildings have many common components, including their distinctive cantilever design which provides open interior space, free of columns, by suspending the floors from a central core. Both buildings sit on large, landscaped sites, adjacent to similarly styled smaller buildings, are decorated in pastel earthtones, and have somewhat obscured windows.

Like the Calico Mills design, the Wright Tower, when occupied at night, is reminiscent of a Japanese lantern with inside lighting illuminating the grillwork with a soft, yellow glow. During the month of December in the 1970s and early 1980s, transparent color gels were placed on the inside of the windows to form large seasonal symbols when the office lights were left on. Other notable features of the building are several Wright-inspired stained glass windows and a glass elevator system on the building's exterior, surrounded by a low dome that houses the building's air conditioning systems and accented with a reflecting pool and fountain.

The building was constructed between 1965 and 1966 with the Robert E. McKee General Contractor Company of Dallas, Texas serving as the builder. McKee was chosen partly due to his skillful erection of the Wright-designed Grady Gammage Memorial Auditorium in Tempe, Arizona which had been completed a year earlier.

== Ownership ==
An affiliate of In-Rel Properties acquired the property from Kaden Companies Partnership in 2018. Kaden acquired the building in 1986 and changed its name from the Lincoln Income Life Insurance Tower to the Kaden Tower. After purchasing the tower, Kaden contracted Louisville's Grossman Chapman Klarer Architects and invested $2 million in a renovation of the property. Completed in 1987, the renovation included updated office spaces, auditorium, and a repainted exterior. A subsequent update in 2003 added air conditioning to the exterior elevator system. A Ruth's Chris Steak House restaurant is located on the top floor. The lower floors are all office space. Adjoining the office building sits The Plaza at Wright Tower, an event venue that holds up to 150 people.

In August 2026, restaurant Texas Roadhouse purchased the structure which is next to its headquarters building saying it was planning for future growth possibilities.

== See also ==
- List of tallest buildings in Louisville
