= Robert E. McKee =

American construction contractor (1889–1964)

- Born: June 15, 1889; Chicago, Illinois, US
- Died: October 21, 1964 (aged 75); El Paso, Texas, US
- Resting place: Restlawn Memorial Park, El Paso, Texas
- Other name: R. E. McKee
- Education: Washington University
- Occupation: Construction Contractor
- Employer(s): Robert E. McKee General Contractor, Inc.
- Spouse: Gladys Evelyn McKee (m. 1911–1960 her death) Mary Grace Ross McKee (m. 1960)
- Children: 8 (including Robert E. Mckee Jr.)

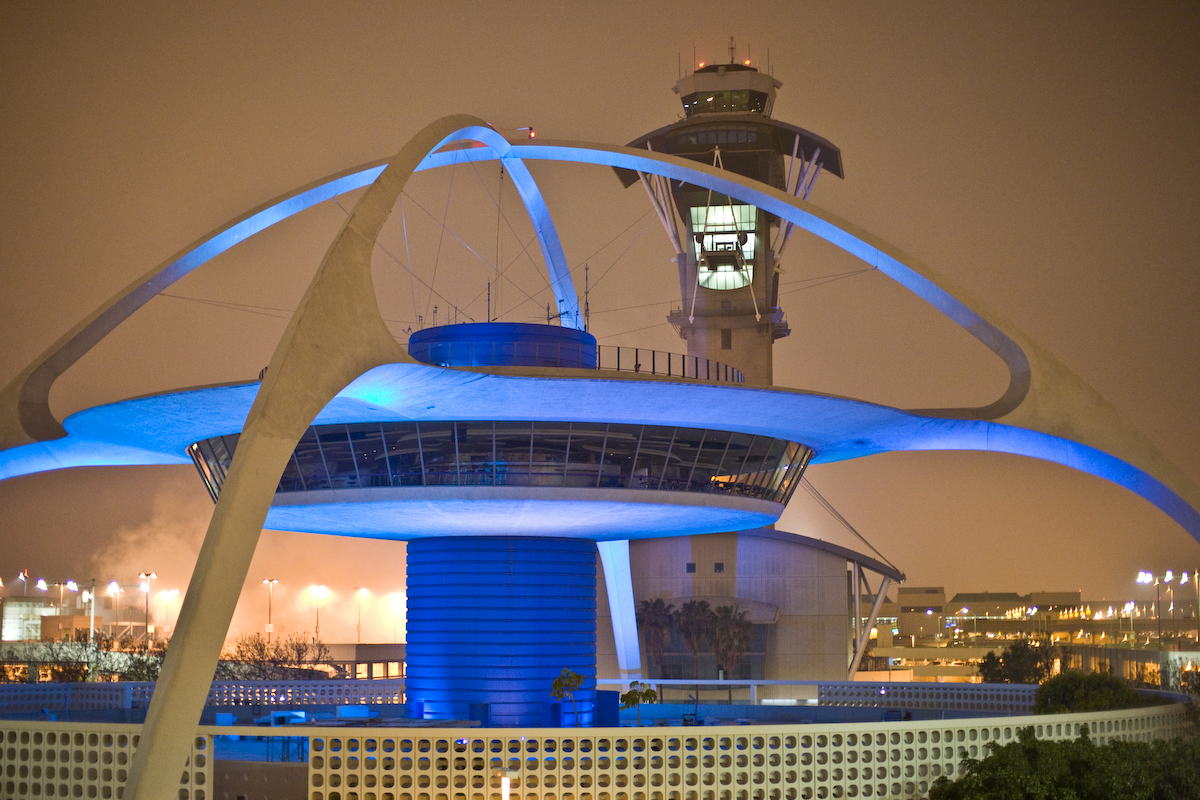
Theme Building at LAX completed in 1961

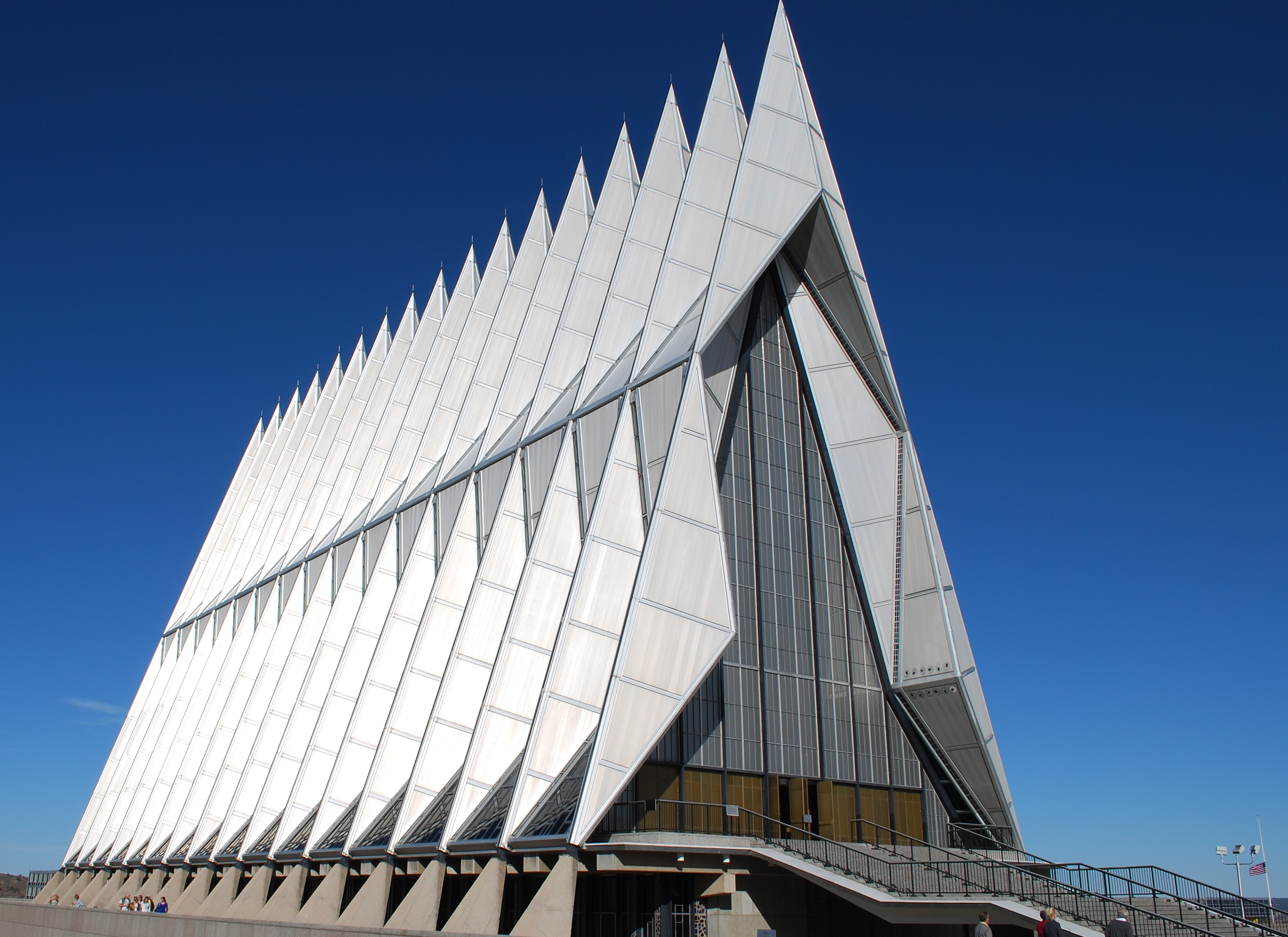
United States Air Force Academy Cadet Chapel completed in 1962

Robert Eugene McKee Sr. (1889–1964) was an American construction contractor and founder of the Robert E. McKee General Contractor, Inc. company.

== Life and career ==
McKee was born in Chicago at a young age he and his family moved to St. Louis. His father was accidentally killed when he was ten years old. McKee received his education from the Manual Training School of Washington University. After school he left St. Louis to live on his uncle's ranch in Elk, New Mexico. After a short stay at the ranch he moved to El Paso, Texas in 1910 to begin his career in the construction and engineering field. on September 20, 1911, he married Gladys Evelyn Woods the two would go on to have eight children. In 1913 he started his namesake construction company. His company quickly grew completing many projects in El Paso including the Knickerbocker Apartments. His company would later begin to expand opening additional offices in Dallas, Santa Fe, Los Angeles and Honolulu. McKee grew his company to build many large scale projects including hospitals, high-rises and government buildings other specialties included military installations including the Panama Canal Zone and Los Alamos, New Mexico. The stature of McKee as a contractor led to many clients including Conrad Hilton, and the United States Government. In 1950 McKee incorporated his company as Robert E. McKee General Contractor Inc. until that time he had been the largest individual contractor in the United States. After incorporating the company would grow to be the sixth largest construction company in the country. For the company's work at Los Alamos, New Mexico the employees were presented the Army-Navy "E" Award for excellence. The company was later managed by McKee's son Robert E. McKee Jr. McKee's wife Gladys died in 1960, McKee then remarried to Mary Grace Ross.

McKee died in El Paso on October 21, 1964, at the age of 75. After his death the company continued to build many large scale projects across the United States. The company was acquired by Santa Fe Industries in 1972. The McKee Construction Company would continue as a subsidiary of Santa Fe Industries. During the 1970s the company went under the name REMCON. In 1987 the McKee company was sold to Jacobs Engineering Group.

== Selected works ==
- Ft. Bayard Veterans Hospital, Ft. Bayard, New Mexico (1921–22)
- Union Station, Phoenix, Arizona (1923)
- Cactus Hotel, San Angelo, Texas, (1928)
- O. T. Bassett Tower El Paso, Texas (1929–30)
- Austin High School, El Paso, Texas (1930)
- San Ysidro United States Customs House, San Diego, California, (1933)
- United States Courthouse, El Paso, Texas (1936)
- Los Angeles Union Passenger Terminal, Los Angeles, California (1937–39)
- Additions to Hickam Field O'ahu, Hawaii (1939–1941)
- Nevada Test Site, Nye County, Nevada (1951)
- The Statler Hilton Hotel (later known as Wilshire Grand Hotel) Los Angeles, California (1952) – (Demolished)
- Nellis Air Force Base Ammunition Storage Depot, Clark County, Nevada (1953)
- Grady Memorial Hospital, Atlanta, Georgia (1954)
- Strategic Air Command Control Headquarters, Offutt Air Force Base, Nebraska (1955–56)
- United States Air Force Academy Cadet Quarters, Colorado Springs, Colorado (1956–58)
- Los Angeles International Airport and Theme Building, Los Angeles, California (1957–61)
- United States Air Force Academy Planetarium, Colorado Springs, Colorado (1958)
- Federal Building, Little Rock, Arkansas (1959–61)
- United States Air Force Academy Cadet Chapel, Colorado Springs, Colorado, (1959–62)
- Kaiser Center, Oakland, California (1960)
- Harbor Medical Center, Torrance, California (1960–62)
- Tucson House, Tucson, Arizona (1960–63)
- East–West Center, University of Hawaii, Honolulu, Hawaii (1961–62)
- Mount St. Joseph University, Cincinnati, Ohio (1961–62)
- One San Jacinto Plaza, El Paso, Texas (1961–62)
- The 800 Apartments, Louisville, Kentucky (1961–63)
- Temple Mount Siani, El Paso, Texas (1962)
- Gammage Memorial Auditorium, Arizona State University, Tempe, Arizona (1962–64)
- Wallace F. Bennett Federal Building, Salt Lake City, Utah (1962–64)
- University of California, Irvine (initial six buildings) Irvine, California (1964–65)
- First National Bank Tower, Dallas, Texas (1965)
- Wright Tower, Louisville, Kentucky (1965–66)
- Glendale Community College, Glendale, Arizona (1965–66)
- New Mexico State Capital Building, Santa Fe, New Mexico (1966)
- Long Beach Veterans Hospital (additions and modernization) Long Beach, California (1965–68)
- Marin County Civic Center Hall of Justice, San Rafael, California (1965–69)
- Salt River Project Administration Building addition, Tempe, Arizona (1967)
- Cañada College, Redwood City, California (1967–68)
- Los Angeles Convention Center, Los Angeles, California (1969–71)
- City National Plaza, Los Angeles, California (1969–71)
- Martin Luther King Jr. Hospital, Willowbrook, California (1969–72)
- Olive View Medical Center, Sylmar, California (1970)
- John Fitzgerald Kennedy Memorial, Dallas, Texas (1970)
- El Paso Civic Center, El Paso, Texas (1970–72)
- Capital Plaza Office Tower, Frankfort, Kentucky
- Earl Cabell Federal Building, Dallas, Texas (1971)
- Wells Fargo Plaza, El Paso, Texas (1971)
- William Beaumont General Hospital, El Paso, Texas (1972)
- St. Vincent Medical Center, Los Angeles, California (1973)
- Cedars-Sinai Medical Center, Los Angeles, California (1972–76)
- Dallas City Hall, Dallas, Texas (1972–78)
