= Colonial Penn =

American insurance company

Colonial Penn Life Insurance Company
- Formerly: Colonial Penn Life Insurance Company (1968–1998); Conseco Direct Life (1998–2001)
- Type: Subsidiary
- Industry: Finance and Insurance
- Founded: 1968; 58 years ago
- Headquarters: Philadelphia, Pennsylvania, U.S.
- Key people: Leonard Davis (founder)
- Products: Insurance
- Parent: CNO Financial Group (1997–present)
- Website: www.colonialpenn.com

The Colonial Penn Life Insurance Company (often known as simply Colonial Penn) is an American life insurance company based in Philadelphia, Pennsylvania, founded by philanthropist and AARP co-founder Leonard Davis, and owned by CNO Financial Group. Colonial Penn, which began as an insurance provider through AARP focused on people over 65, now has a marketing campaign that is aimed at people between the age of 50 and 85, specializing in "guaranteed acceptance whole life insurance" to help their families cover funeral costs after the individual dies.

== History ==
Utility holding company FPL Group acquired Colonial Penn in 1985. FPL sold Colonial Penn to Leucadia National in 1991.

Conseco bought Colonial Penn from Leucadia in 1997, and in 1998 renamed it Conseco Direct Life to reflect Conseco ownership. In 2001, Conseco reverted to the Colonial Penn name, which remains a subsidiary of the renamed CNO Financial Group, along with Bankers Life and the Washington National Insurance Company.

== Advertising ==
Colonial Penn is known for its television commercials that target viewers aged 50 and over. The original spokesman for the company was Ed McMahon. Another prominent spokesman for the company was Jeopardy! host Alex Trebek, who often did commercials with McMahon. Other spokespeople included Lou Rawls, Meredith Vieira, Mary Lou Retton, Tom Bergeron, and Joe Theismann, among others.

Since 2019, Colonial Penn sales manager Jonathan Lawson has appeared as a pitchman in the commercials while Trebek was unavailable at times due to health issues. When Trebek died in November 2020, most, if not all, commercials featuring him were removed and were replaced by Lawson on a temporary basis, and the life insurance company's website removed all references to Trebek. A week after Trebek died, Colonial Penn announced that his family would receive benefits and funeral expenses. In the months following Trebek's death, Colonial Penn aired commercials paying tribute to Trebek.
