= Las Americas Premium Outlets =

Shopping mall in San Diego, California

- Location: San Ysidro, San Diego, California, United States
- Coordinates: 32.543972°N 117.042815°W
- Address: 4211 Camino de la Plaza
- Opened: November 2001
- Developer: Stoltz Real Estate Partners and institutional investors advised by Pacific Coast Capital
- Manager: Simon's Premium Outlets
- Owner: Simon Property Group
- Num. of stores: 125
- Floor area: 560,000 square feet (52,000 m^{2})
- Website: www.premiumoutlets.com

Las Americas Premium Outlets is an outlet mall in San Ysidro, San Diego, California, located directly on the Mexico–United States border, just west of the San Ysidro Port of Entry. The 560,000 square feet (52,000 m^{2}) center attracts shoppers from San Diego County as well as the Tijuana metropolitan area in Mexico immediately to the south.
