= CNO Financial Group =

American financial services company

CNO Financial Group Inc.
- Formerly: Conseco Inc. (1979–2010)
- Type: Public
- Traded as: NYSE: CNO; S&P 400 Component
- Industry: Financial services
- Founded: 1979; 47 years ago
- Headquarters: Carmel, Indiana, United States
- Key people: Gary C. Bhojwani (CEO)
- Products: Insurance
- Revenue: ▼$ 3.8 billion (2015)
- Operating income: ▲$ 367.7 million (2015)
- Net income: ▼$ 270.7 million (2015)
- Total assets: ▼$ 31.1 billion (2015)
- Total equity: ▼$ 4.1 billion (2014)
- Number of employees: 3,300 (2017)
- Subsidiaries: Colonial Penn, Bankers Life, 40/86 Advisors, Washington National Insurance Company
- Website: https://www.cnoinc.com/

CNO Financial Group, Inc., formerly Conseco, Inc. (Consolidated National Security Corporation), is an American financial services holding company based in Carmel, Indiana. Its insurance subsidiaries provide life insurance, annuity and supplemental health insurance products to more than four million customers in the United States. These products are distributed through independent agents, career agents and direct to customers through television advertising and direct mail.

CNO Financial Group is the parent company of seven insurance companies, including Bankers Life and Casualty Company and Colonial Penn Life Insurance Company. They also own 40/86 Advisors, an investment management company and Washington National Insurance Company.

== History ==
CNO Financial was incorporated in 1979 as Security National of Indiana Corp. by Stephen Hilbert. SNI bought Consolidated National Life Insurance Co. in 1983. It began insurance operations in 1982 and became a public company in 1985.

In 1986, Conseco acquired Lincoln Income Life Insurance Company at $29 per share for $32.3 million. Shearson Lehman Brothers advised Lincoln Income Life Insurance. Earlier, in mid-1985, Lincoln had agreed to be acquired by I.C.H. for $31 per share in cash but the merger could not be consummated as the Kentucky Department of Insurance raised objections to certain expenses which Lincoln would have incurred in the merger. Lincoln also received a merger proposal from Redgate in 1985. Conseco stepped up its acquisition efforts in 1986 and purchased Bankers National Life Insurance Company for $118 million.

In 1998, Conseco purchased the former Greentree Financial, one of the largest financiers of mobile homes, in an attempt to diversify into consumer financial services. They also bought life insurance company Colonial Penn later that year, changing their name to Conseco Direct Life, though changing the name back to Colonial Penn in 2001 (known as Bankers Conseco Life Insurance Company in New York state). Conseco (though not its subsidiary insurance companies) entered Chapter 11 reorganization in 2002 and emerged nine months later in 2003. Conseco's bankruptcy was the third largest U.S. Chapter 11 filing at the time, after the bankruptcies of WorldCom Inc. and Enron. In the process of reorganization, GreenTree was divested and thereafter Conseco solely focused on the insurance industry.

From its opening in 1999 until 2011, the company (when it was known as Conseco) held the naming rights to the home arena of the NBA's Indiana Pacers; the naming rights were transferred to Bankers Life in 2011.

On May 11, 2010, the board of directors officially approved changing the holding company's name to CNO Financial Group.

In February 2015, CNO Financial sold its Hyderabad-based India operations to Cognizant.

As of 2026, CNO ranks 738 on the Fortune 1000.
