= Federal Building (Little Rock, Arkansas) =

Federal building in Little Rock, Arkansas, U.S.

- U.S. National Register of Historic Places
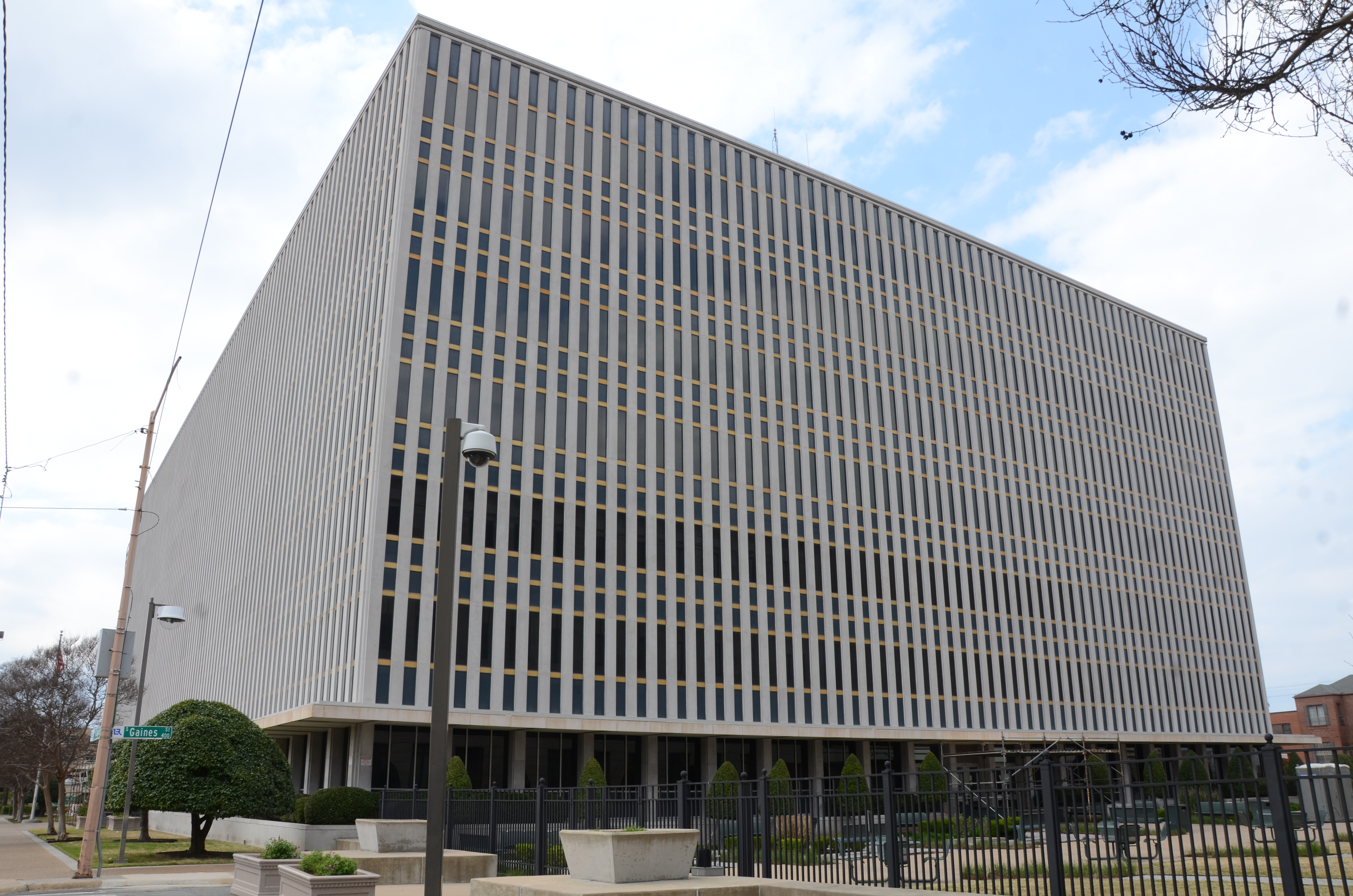

- Location within Arkansas Location within the United States
- Location: 700 W. Capitol Ave., Little Rock, Arkansas, U.S.
- Coordinates: 34°44′43″N 92°16′44″W
- Area: 2.1 acres (0.85 ha)
- Built: 1961
- Architects: Swaim & Allen & Associates; Ginocchio, Cromwell & Associates
- Architectural style: Modern
- NRHP reference No.: 15000206
- Added to NRHP: May 5, 2015

The Federal Building of Little Rock, Arkansas, United States, is located at 700 West Capitol Avenue, adjacent to the Richard Sheppard Arnold United States Post Office and Courthouse. It is a large seven-story Modern structure, occupying an entire city block, built in 1962 to the designs of the local firms of Swaim & Allen & Associates and Ginocchio, Cromwell & Associates. Utilizing modern curtain-wall construction, its exterior (on all four sides) is dominated on the upper floors by narrow windows separated by limestone spandrels. The south-facing main entrance is recessed, consisting of several pairs of double doors, with flanking gold-colored grillwork. The building was built by Robert E. McKee General Contractor, Inc. of Dallas, Texas.

The building was listed on the National Register of Historic Places in 2015.

== See also ==
- National Register of Historic Places listings in Little Rock, Arkansas
