= Lincoln Income Life Insurance Company =

- Formerly: Income Life Insurance of Kentucky
- Industry: insurance
- Founded: 1928
- Successor: Conseco
- Headquarters: Louisville, Kentucky
- Services: life insurance accident insurance fire insurance

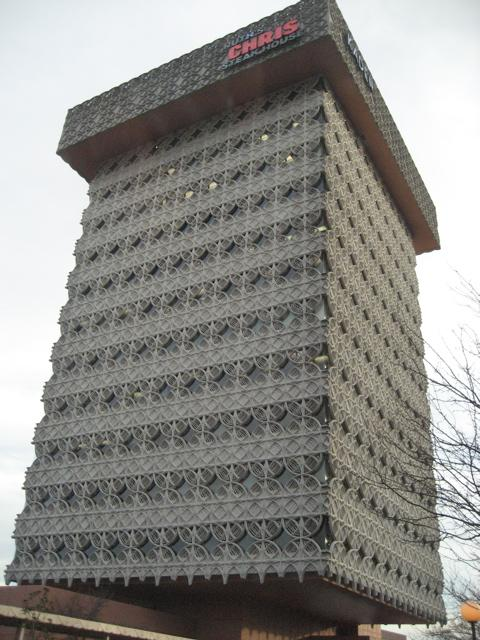

Lincoln Income Life Insurance Company, originally Income Life Insurance of Kentucky was an insurance corporation based in Louisville, Kentucky. It provided life insurance, accident insurance, and fire insurance for over 70 years until it was acquired in 1986 by Conseco.

== History ==
Income Life Insurance Company of Louisville, Kentucky was incorporated in 1928 and began business in 1929. Initial paid in capital was $158,580 and was increased in 1930 to $192,630. Capital was reduced in 1931 to $129,690 and to $100,150 in 1932. In 1936 capital was increased to $101,522. In 1933 this company reinsured the Dixie-Atlas-Republic Insurance Company, Nashville, Tennessee.

In 1936 Lincoln Life and Accident Insurance Company, a Muskogee or Oklahoma City, Oklahoma insurance company merged with Income Life of Louisville, Kentucky, under the name of Lincoln Income Life Insurance Company.

The company was acquired by Conseco in 1986 and was merged with another of Conseco's companies Bankers National Life Insurance Company. Bankers National Life Insurance Company was subsequently merged into Washington National Insurance Company.

== See also ==
- William S. Key, worked as Director of Lincoln Income Life Insurance Company in late 1940s
- Wright Tower (originally named Lincoln Tower and later Kaden Tower), building by William Wesley Peters (1966)
