= Plaza Viva Tijuana =

Open-air shopping center in Tijuana, Mexico

Coordinates: 32°32′23″N 117°1′50″W

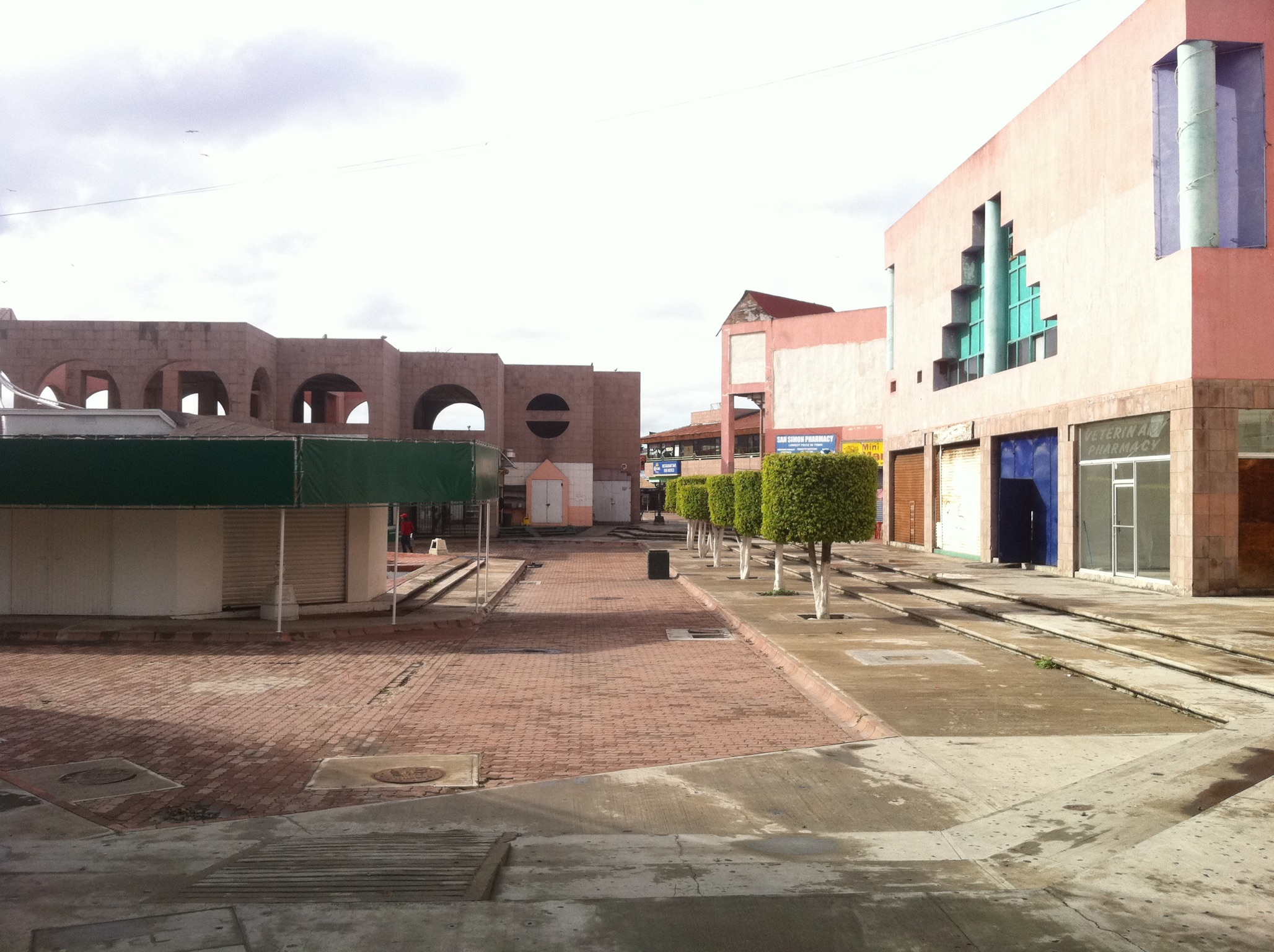
An empty Plaza Viva Tijuana in December 2010

Plaza Viva Tijuana is an open-air shopping center in the Empleados Federales neighborhood of Tijuana, located immediately across Frontera Street from what was, until 2012, the entrance to Mexico for all pedestrians crossing from the U.S. side of the San Ysidro of the Mexico–United States border. It houses numerous pharmacies targeted at U.S. customers, handicraft and souvenir shops, restaurants, and one of Tijuana's largest gay nightclubs (formerly "Éxtasis" now "Club Fusion").

In 2012, the Puerta México pedestrian crossing on the west side of the southbound vehicular crossing, controversially, closed, replaced by the new Puerta México Este pedestrian entry to Mexico on the east side. It still allowed pedestrians to walk westward 500m and exit to Tijuana in front of Plaza Viva Tijuana, but also gave pedestrians easy access to areas on the east side of the border such as the Zona Río. Business plummeted for merchants in the center, by up to 80% in one instance.

In July 2016, pedestrian traffic once again increased to the area around Plaza Viva Tijuana as it became the starting point of the new pedestrian walkway to and from the new PedWest pedestrian crossing, via which pedestrians cross to Virginia Avenue and Las Americas Premium Outlets on the U.S. side. Since then, there has been a reconfiguration and the pedestrian terminus is immediately west of the Plaza, across Aves. Alberto Aldrete and José María Larroque.
