= San Ysidro Port of Entry =

Border crossing between Mexico and the U.S.

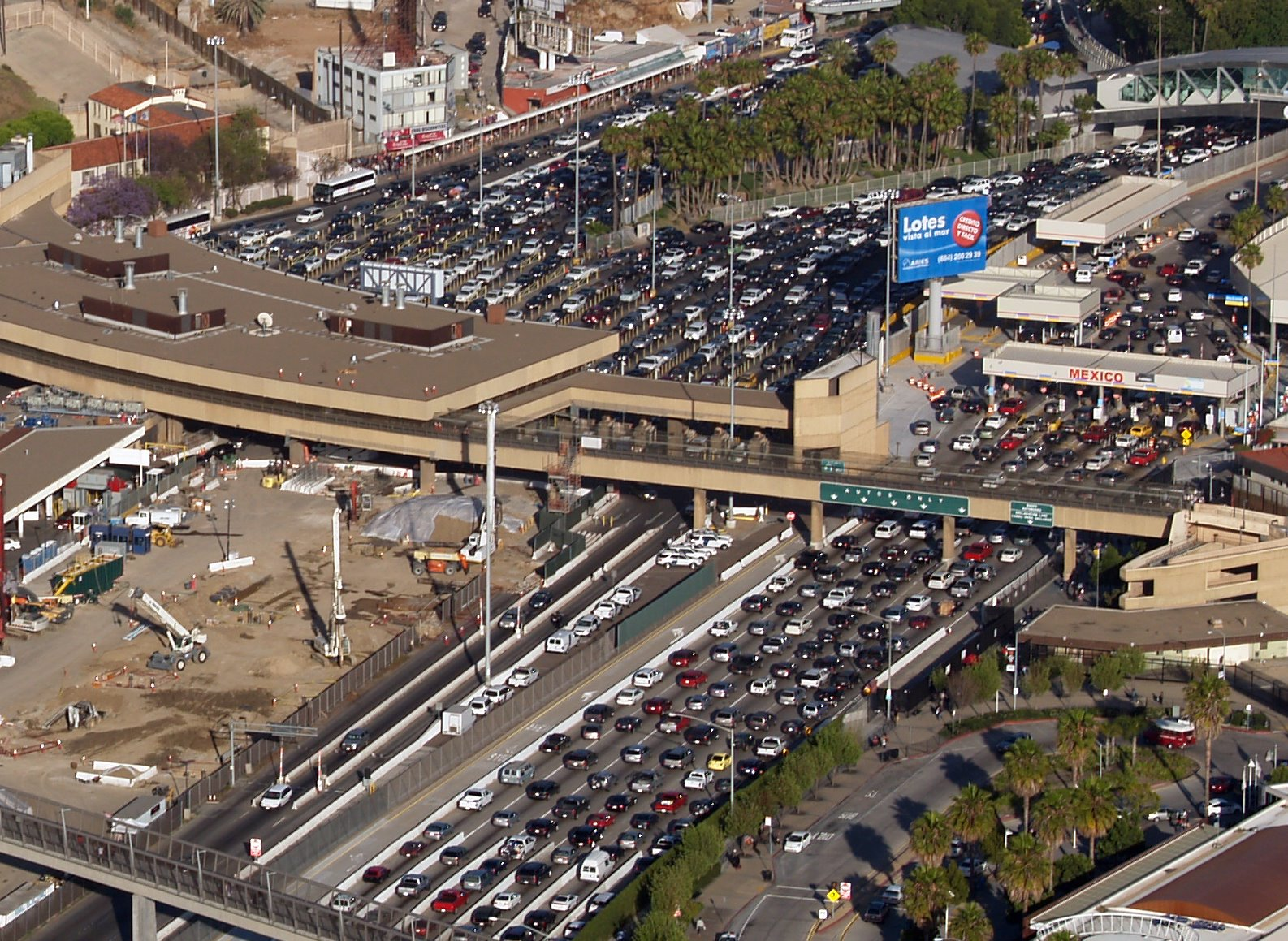
- San Ysidro Border Inspection Station in 2011

Location
- Country: United States
- Location: I-5 / Fed. 1; 720 East San Ysidro Blvd. San Ysidro, CA 92173
- Coordinates: 32°32′36″N 117°01′47″W

Details
- Opened: 1906

Statistics
- 2019 Cars: 14,979,363
- 2019 Individuals: 53,296,133
- 2019 Pedestrians: 10,799,398

Website
- https://www.bts.gov/browse-statistical-products-and-data/border-crossing-data/border-crossingentry-data

The San Ysidro Port of Entry (aka the San Ysidro Land Port of Entry or the San Ysidro LPOE) is the largest land border crossing between San Diego and Tijuana, and the fourth-busiest land border crossing in the world (second-busiest excluding the crossings between mainland China and its two special administrative regions) with 70,000 northbound vehicles and 20,000 northbound pedestrians crossing each day, in addition to southbound traffic. It connects Mexican Federal Highway 1 on the Mexican side with Interstate 5 on the American side. The San Ysidro Port of Entry is one of three ports of entry in the San Diego–Tijuana metropolitan region.

At the San Ysidro port of entry in Tijuana, access is available for motorcycles, pedestrians, and vehicles. This is because it is one of the ports of entry that experiences the heaviest traffic, with wait times reaching up to 6 hours on weekends.

== Gateways ==
There is a northbound and southbound vehicle crossing, as well as two separate bidirectional pedestrian crossings.

=== Northbound vehicle crossing ===
There are currently 34 northbound vehicle lanes to cross from Mexico to the U.S.

U.S. CBP officials at the San Ysidro Port of Entry launched a pilot program designed to enhance operational efficiency while maintaining the highest standards of security. The adjustments will be initiated in Tijuana and will require converting the general crossing lane on Second Street into an exclusive SENTRI access lane. This program is supported by a strong partnership and close collaboration with the Government of Mexico. This effort began from late October to mid-November, 2025.

=== Southbound vehicle crossing (El Chaparral) ===
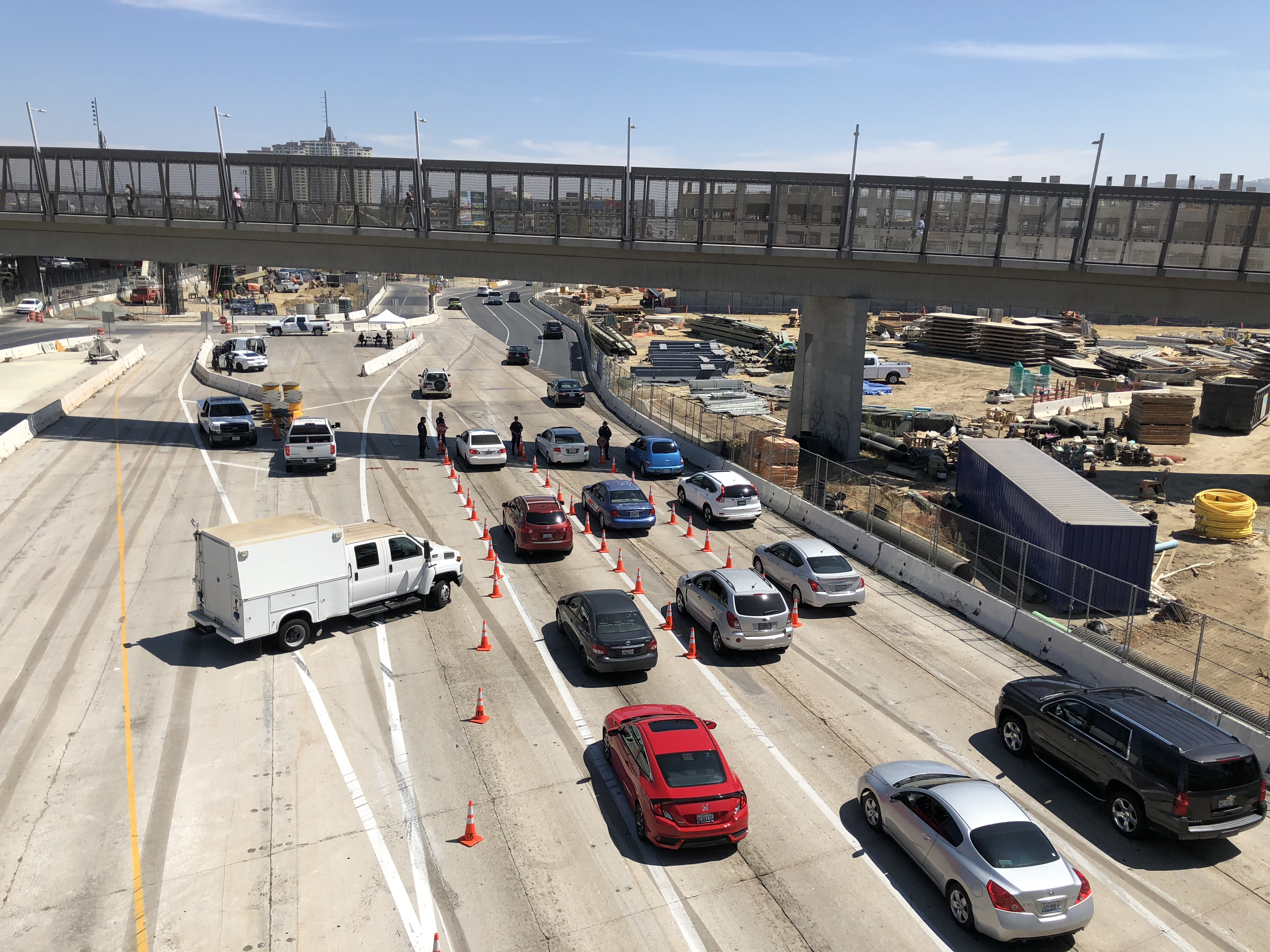
CBP checkpoint

The southbound lanes of Interstate 5 which take vehicles into Mexico have been moved west of their previous location through the new El Chaparral Point of Entry (Spanish: Puerta México el Chaparral). It replaced the former entry point known as Puerta México which stood immediately east of El Chaparral. The opening of El Chaparral roughly tripled the number of traffic lanes to 22, reducing wait times for vehicles entering Mexico. It is roughly in the same location as the former Virginia Avenue crossing, where trucks entering the US from Mexico prior to 1983 was located. Access is via a four-lane, temporary access road that is 0.2 miles (0.32 km) long and leads west from the end of Interstate 5. The El Chaparral gateway also has a vehicle and passenger inspection station at which U.S. officials may conduct inspections of southbound traffic, and provides for more thorough inspection of southbound traffic by Mexican officials. El Chaparral was the name of the Tijuana border crossing prior to the 1983 modifications.

=== Eastern/main pedestrian crossing ===
Pedestrians may cross northbound immediately east of the northbound vehicle crossing. As of May 2017 they are temporarily processed in the Milo building while a new facility is built to the west. There are currently 15 pedestrian lanes, and more will be added with the current expansion project.

The eastern (main) southbound pedestrian crossing is east of the northbound crossing, immediately south of San Ysidro Transit Center. Pedestrians pass through the 6.9-million-dollar, three-story Puerta Este México-San Ysidro building, opened in August 2015, containing Mexican passport control and customs which since late 2017 exits to a path leading to Frontera street just southwest of Ferrocarril street. Prior to 2012 the southbound pedestrian crossing was west of the northbound vehicle crossing and exited to a bridge leading to Plaza Viva Tijuana.

=== PedWest (western pedestrian crossing) ===
The PedWest pedestrian crossing is located at the east side of the Las Americas outlet mall where Virginia Avenue dead-ends at the border, immediately west of the El Chaparral port of entry into Mexico. On the Mexican side a walkway connects PedWest southeastward, ending across the street from the Plaza Viva Tijuana mall, from which there is a bridge to Downtown Tijuana. PedWest opened for northbound pedestrians in July 2016 for southbound pedestrians on July 31, 2017. PedWest improved efficiency as now 63,000 people pass through it each day. There are 10 northbound and 2 reversible lanes. This has also become a better alternative for pedestrian traffic, due to the Southbound I-5 re-alignment.

==== Closure (2020 – 2023) ====
PedWest was closed in April 2020 in response to decreased traffic as a result of the COVID-19 pandemic. By early 2021, the plaza on the Mexican side of PedWest had become a tent city populated by hundreds of asylum-seeking migrants waiting for their cases to be processed by the United States, causing the reopening of the crossing to be delayed indefinitely. Plans to re-open the crossing in December 2022 were halted following the United States Supreme Court's decision to maintain Title 42. PedWest reopened in January 2023 with limited opening hours from 6am to 2pm.

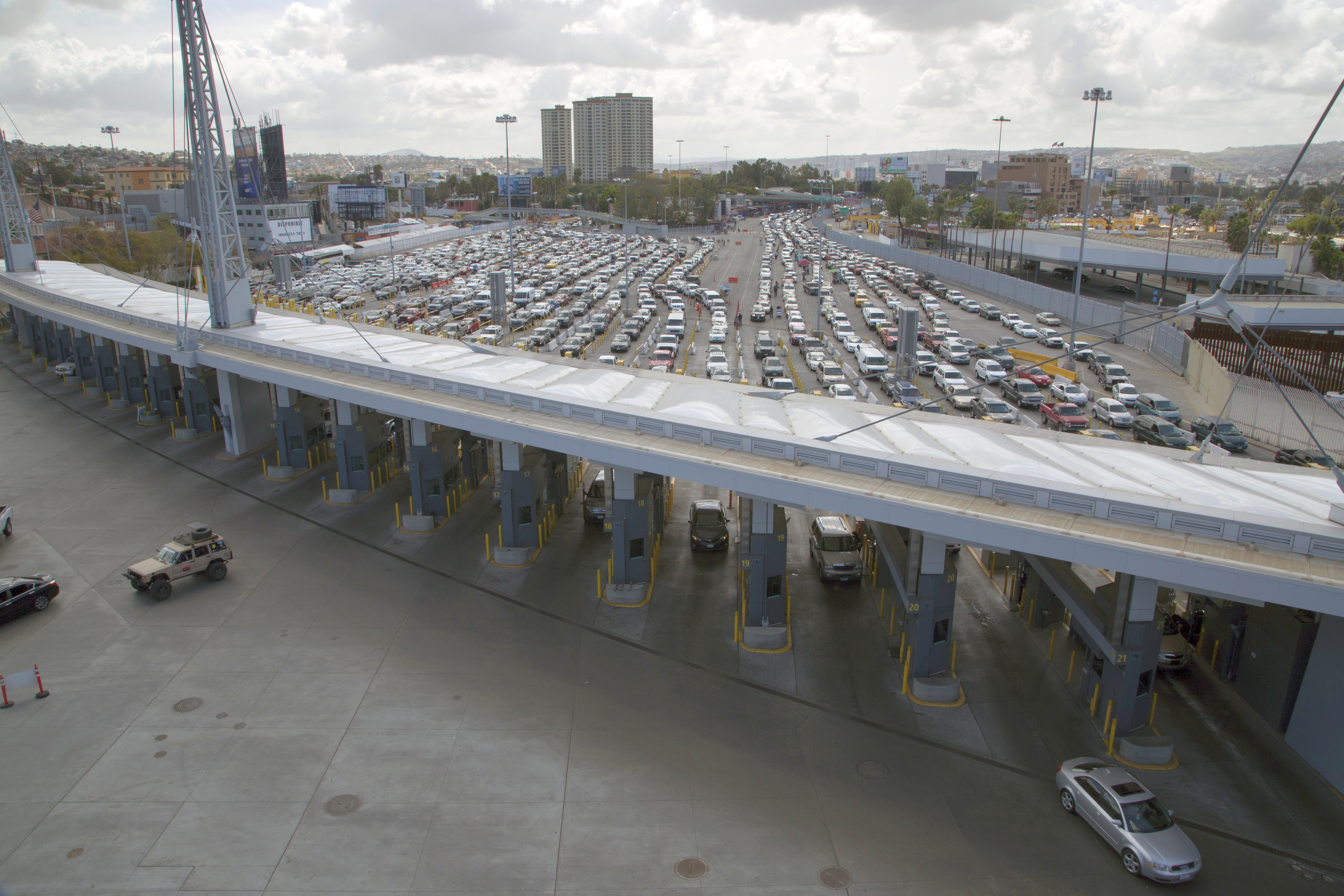
San Ysidro Port of Entry, 2016.

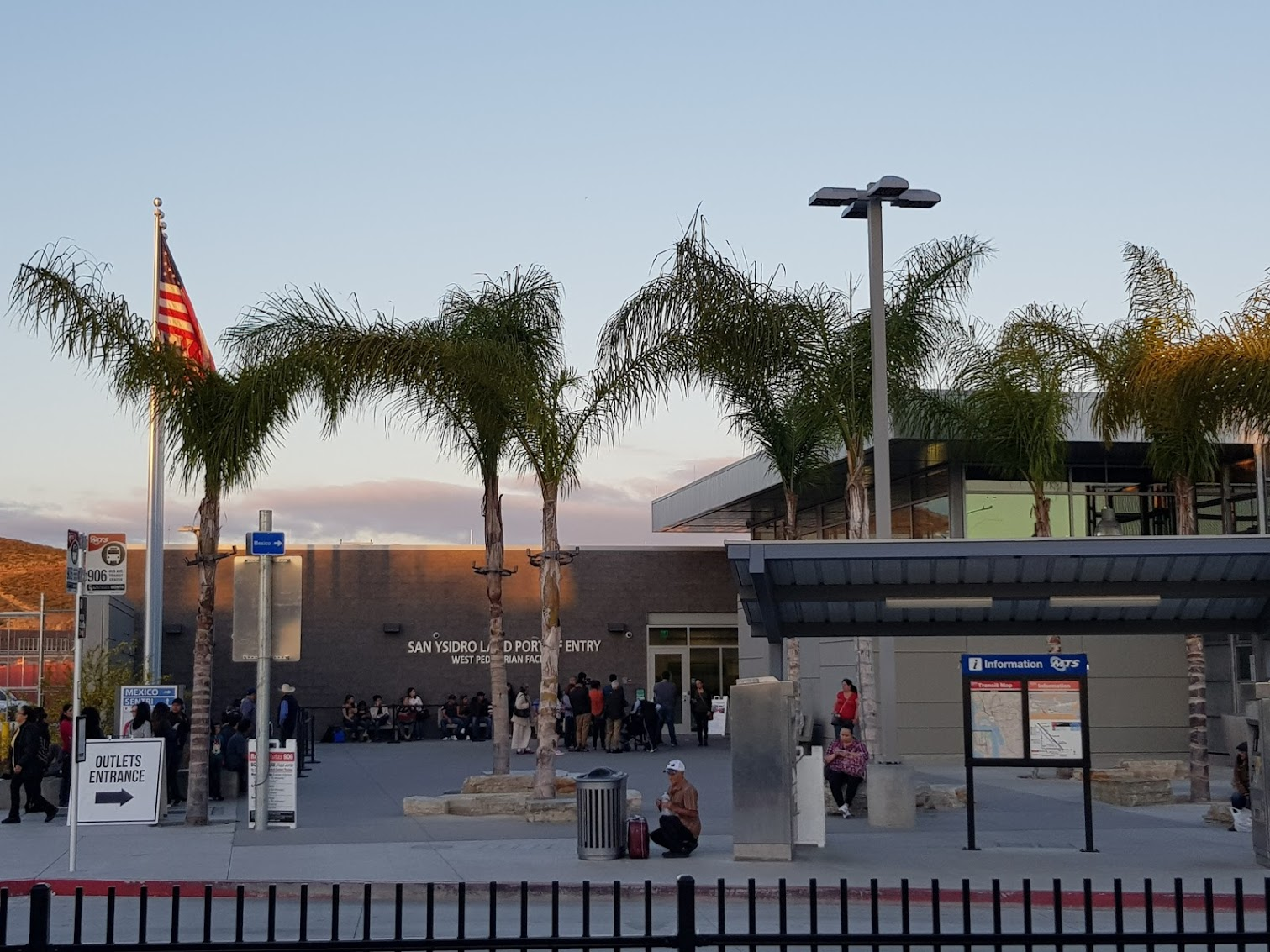
PedWest building, U.S. side, July 2017.

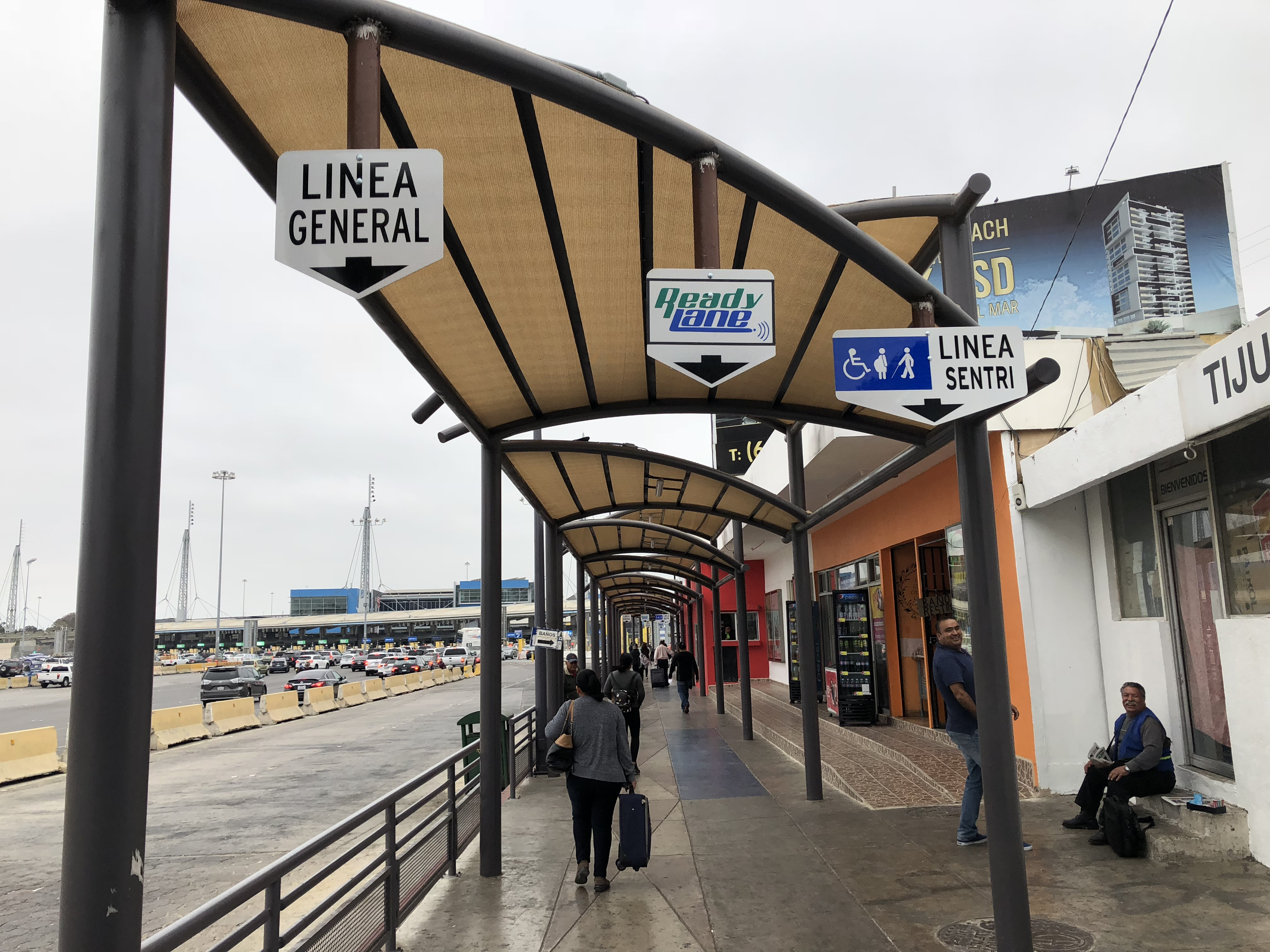
Photo taken in Tijuana on walking path to San Ysidro Land Port of Entry, East Pedestrian Facility.

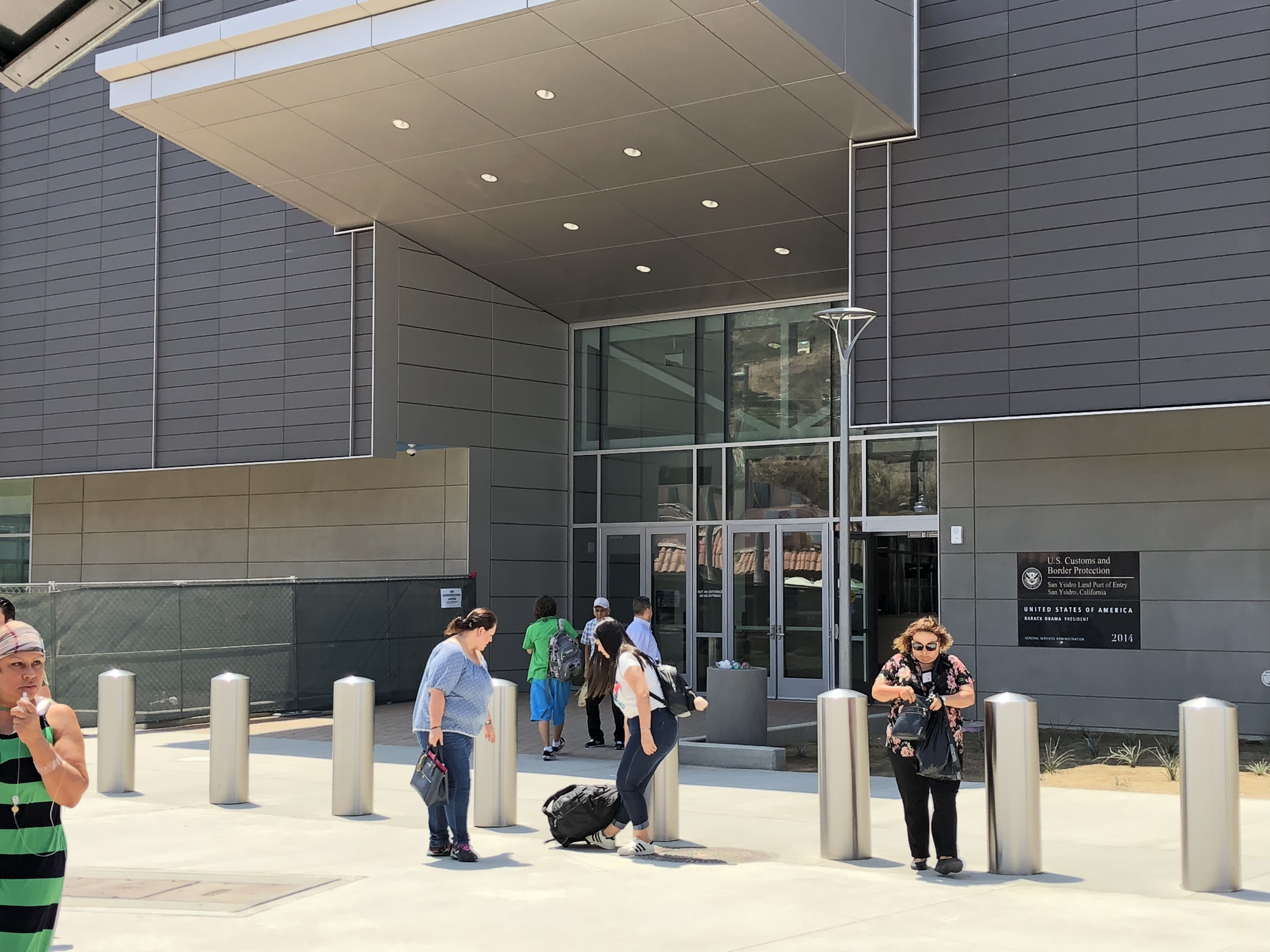
San Ysidro Land Port of Entry
East Pedestrian Facility
Travelers exiting on U.S. side.

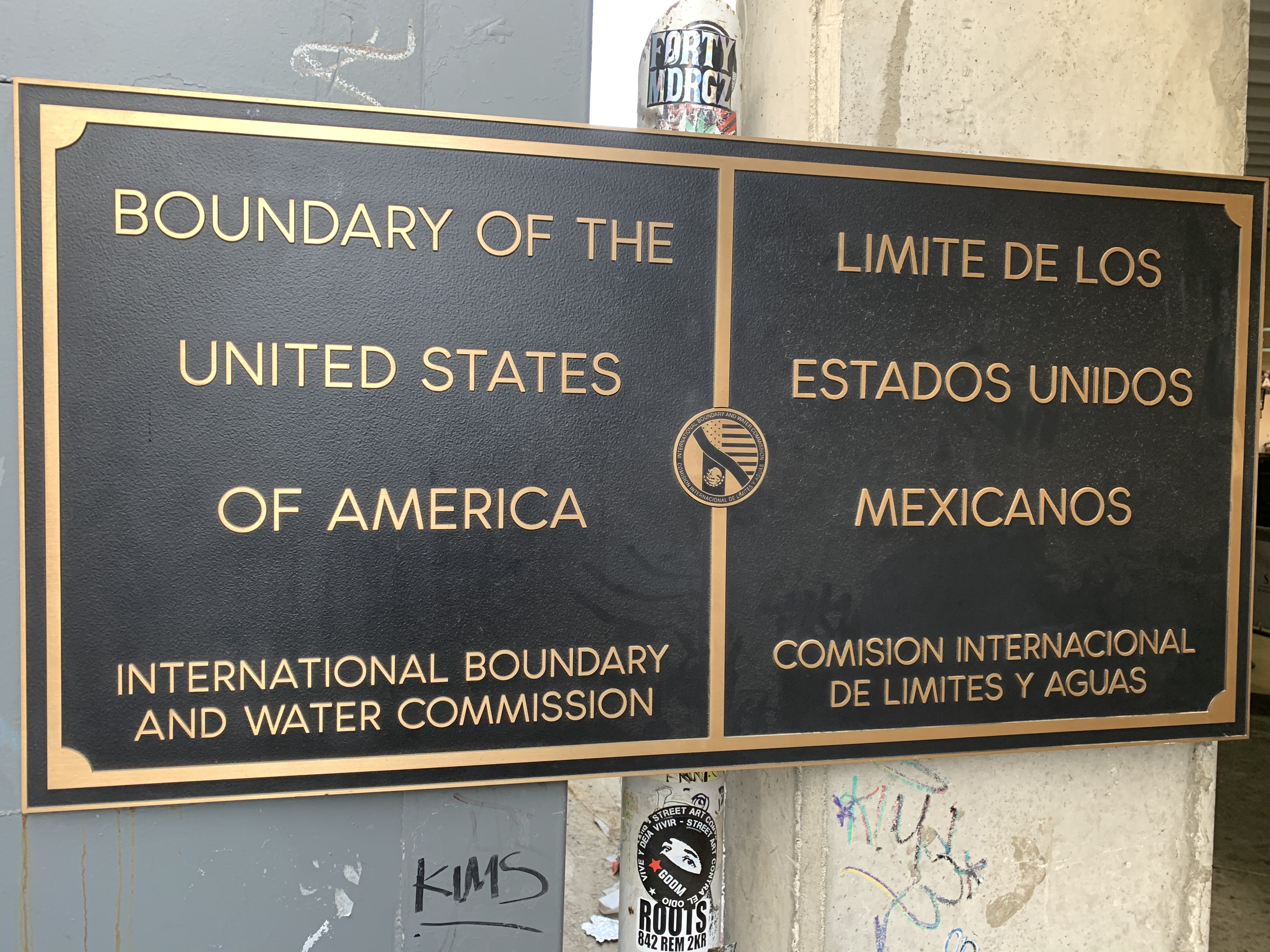
Plaque at the San Ysidro Port of Entry, indicating the Mexico–United States border.

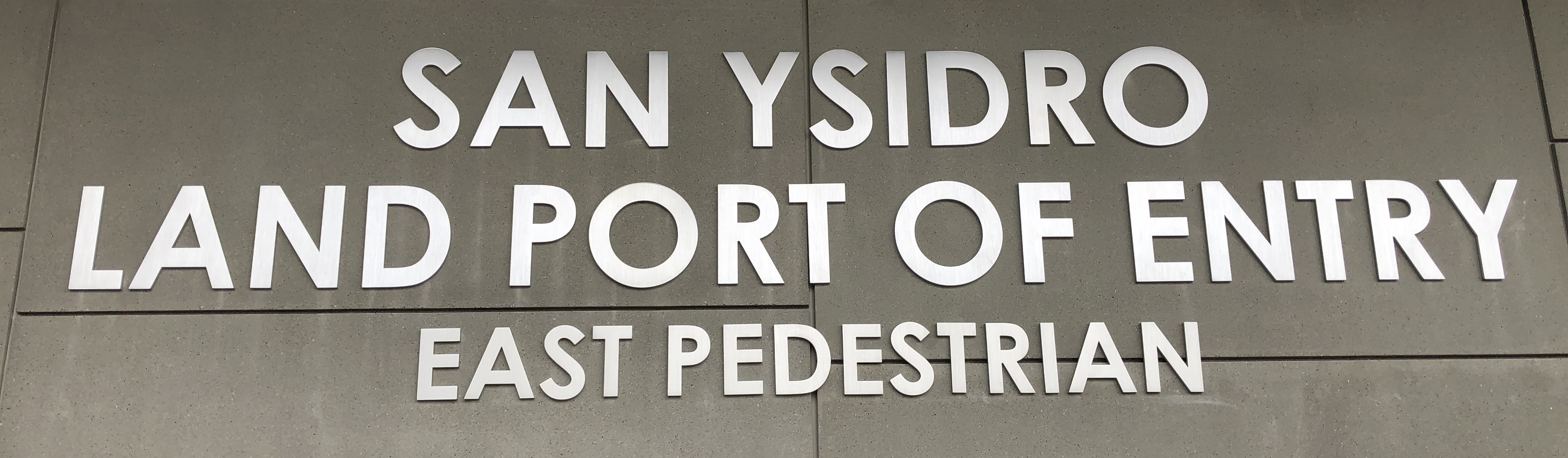
Photo of the sign on the East Pedestrian Facility at the San Ysidro Land Port of Entry.

== History ==
There has been a land border inspection station in the community of San Ysidro since the early 20th century.

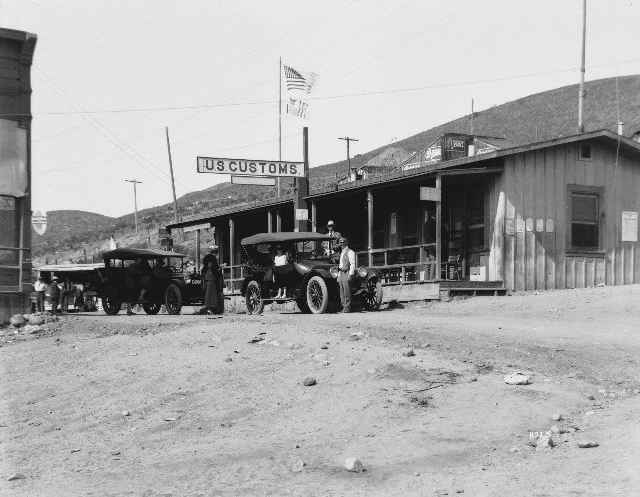
San Ysidro Border Inspection Station in 1922

Cars, pedestrians, trucks and trains have been inspected at this crossing. In the 1950s, due to congestion, truck traffic was moved a short distance west to a crossing at Virginia Avenue. Then in 1983, the Otay Mesa Port of Entry was opened and all truck traffic is now inspected there. In 1933 the NRHP-listed Old Customs House was built in Mission Revival style, and still stands housing offices.

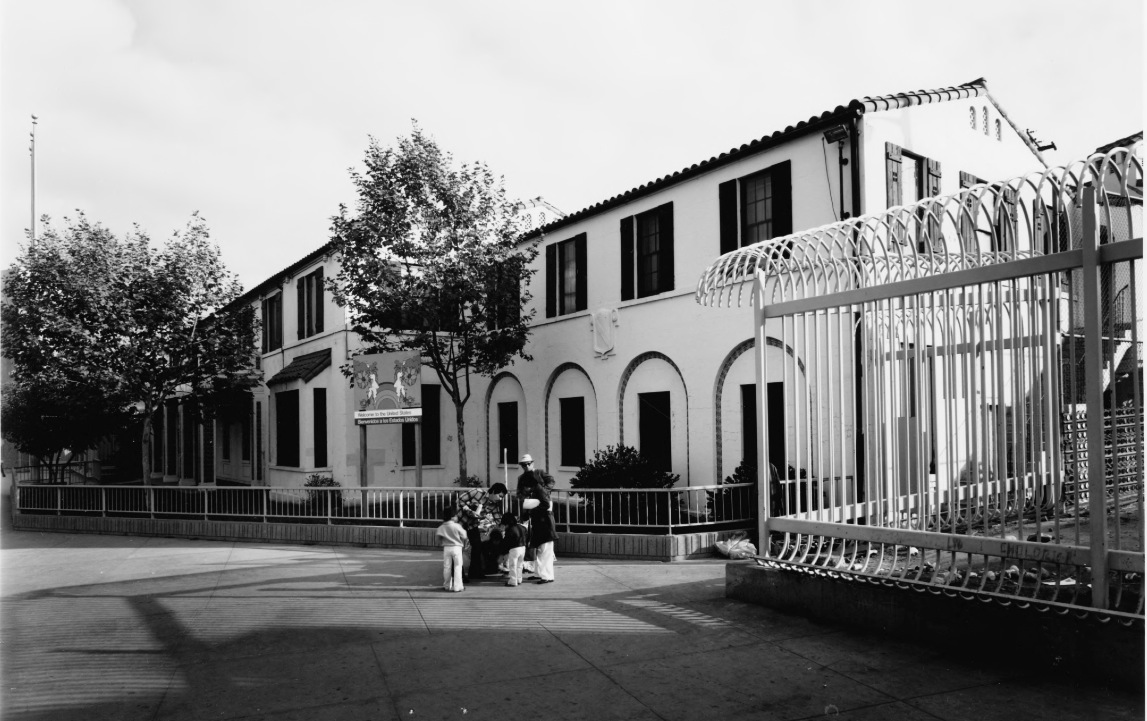
The 1933 Mission Revival-style Old Customs House, in a photo from 1981

The current San Ysidro Land Port of Entry facility was constructed in 1973 to meet the needs of the time and the projected growth in the coming years. This port is considered the busiest international port of entry in the world in terms of individual crossers and vehicle movements from one country to another.

With over 90,000 daily commuters crossing between Tijuana and San Diego, commuting has become a challenge for everyday commuters in the metropolitan region; visitors to and from Baja California spend one to three, and as many as five, hours waiting to enter into the United States. U.S. Border and Customs officials have said that newly implemented inspection technology and properly processing the large number of persons and vehicles who go through the port on a daily basis have resulted in long lines and long wait times.

=== 2018 confrontation ===
On Sunday, November 25, 2018, groups of Central American migrants tried to forcibly cross the border into the United States. Some of them threw rocks at US Border Patrol agents, who responded by firing tear gas into the crowd which included families with small children. The firing of tear gas across the international border into Mexico was immediately protested by the Foreign Ministry of Mexico, which demanded a full investigation.

== Expansion project ==
Proposed San Ysidro Port Facility
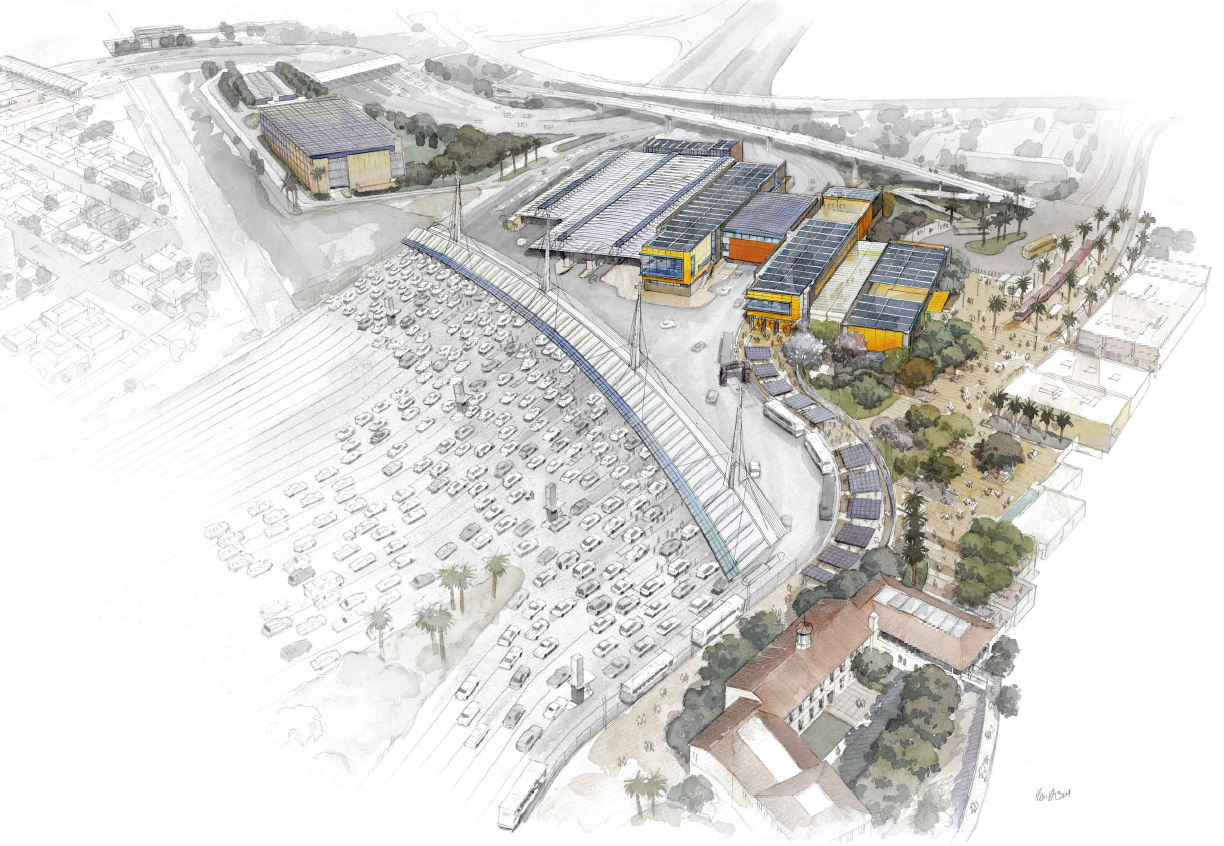
- Aerial view of artist's rendering of the finished San Ysidro Land Port of Entry in 2015.

General information
- Status: Completed
- Type: Administrative, Immigration and Customs Inspection
- Location: San Diego, CA
- Construction started: December 2009
- Opened: December 23, 2019

Technical details
- Floor count: 4
- Floor area: 225,000 sq ft (20,903 m^{2}) of office space, 110,000 sq ft (10,219 m^{2}) of inspection operations space

Design and construction
- Architect: Miller Hull Partnership
- Developer: General Services Administration

The San Ysidro Land Port of Entry Expansion Project is a bi-national effort between the United States and Mexican governments which aims for the demolition, relocation, expansion, renovation, modernization and construction of new administrative and operational facilities of the current land port of entry in the San Ysidro district of San Diego. The project calls for a complete overhaul of the current international border inspection facilities on both sides of the border at a total cost of about $625 million which includes $577 million for the expansion of the northbound U.S. point of entry and roughly $48 million (MXN $583 million) for the construction of an entirely new southbound Mexican point of entry.

The project is being carried out in three phases:

- Phase I involves the expansion of northbound vehicle lanes, the implementation of dual primary vehicle inspection booths and a higher capacity secondary inspection facility.
- Phase II involves the demolition of the current administrative building and construction of bigger replacement along with a multi-story employee parking structure. A new pedestrian processing building will also be constructed.
- Phase III involves the relocation of the southbound lanes entering Mexico. These lanes will be moved west of their current location to make space for the planned expansion of new buildings, parking structure and extra northbound lanes. Their new location will allow for a southbound traffic checkpoint to facilitate U.S. officials to conduct inspection of vehicles heading to Mexico. Mexican officials will greet vehicles and occupants at a bigger and better equipped immigration and customs inspection station known as Puerta Mexico El Chaparral.

After the completion of the expansion project, the total northbound lanes is 34 automobile lanes served by 62 inspection booths. This will also add 110,000 square feet of energy preserving and producing material. Not only is there an expected increase in lanes, but an increase in SENTRI efficiency.

=== Construction ===
2011

- On the U.S. side, construction of the new east/west pedestrian bridge was completed on February 15, 2011.
- On September 14, 2011, part of the wooden panels and support beams from the construction project collapsed on vehicles crossing the border, injuring nine people, two seriously. All northbound traffic was diverted to the Otay Mesa Port of Entry for the rest of the day, causing massive traffic jams.

2013

- On the Tijuana side construction of links to connect the new El Chaparral Facility with Via Rápida and Avenida Internacional, which leads drivers to the western Tijuana borough of Playas de Tijuana and nearby Rosarito Beach, was built in 2013 (see below).

2015

Prior to September 2012, pedestrians walked from the U.S. to Mexico by crossing a pedestrian bridge, entering Mexico to the west of Interstate 5, and walking through a corridor leading to the west side of the crossing (Avenida de la Amistad). Then a temporary pedestrian crossing facility was built on the Mexican side on the east side of the crossing. This was replaced when in August 2015 Mexico inaugurated a new pedestrian crossing facility to the east of the northbound traffic lanes. For the first time foreigners are required to show passports when entering Mexico at the border, whereas previously they only had to be shown when entering the interior of the country.

2016

On July 15, 2016, the PedWest pedestrian crossing and Virginia Avenue transit center were opened. On the Mexican side a temporary, partially enclosed walkway was opened connecting this crossing southeastward to the pedestrian bridge from Plaza Viva Tijuana that heads southwest to Downtown Tijuana. This walkway was nicknamed "Puente Chicanadas" ("cheap/quick fix bridge") and characterized by some as dangerous, suffocating and embarrassing to Mexico. In September 2016, a definitive walkway from Plaza Viva Tijuana costing 25 million pesos (about 1.3 million dollars at the time), was opened.

2017–2019

Phase III began in September 2017, after the realignment of Southbound Interstate 5 had been completed. The project for Phase III was completed in December 2019 which resulted in an increase from 5 inspection lanes to 10. This project also includes an increase in the Northbound inspection lanes by adding 8 new lanes on the east side of the border crossing. This project does not affect existing pedestrian lanes. Architects Miller Hull Partnership were leading the third phase of the project with a budget of US$150 million.

== See also ==
- List of Mexico–United States border crossings
