= ASU Gammage =

Performing arts center in Tempe, Arizona

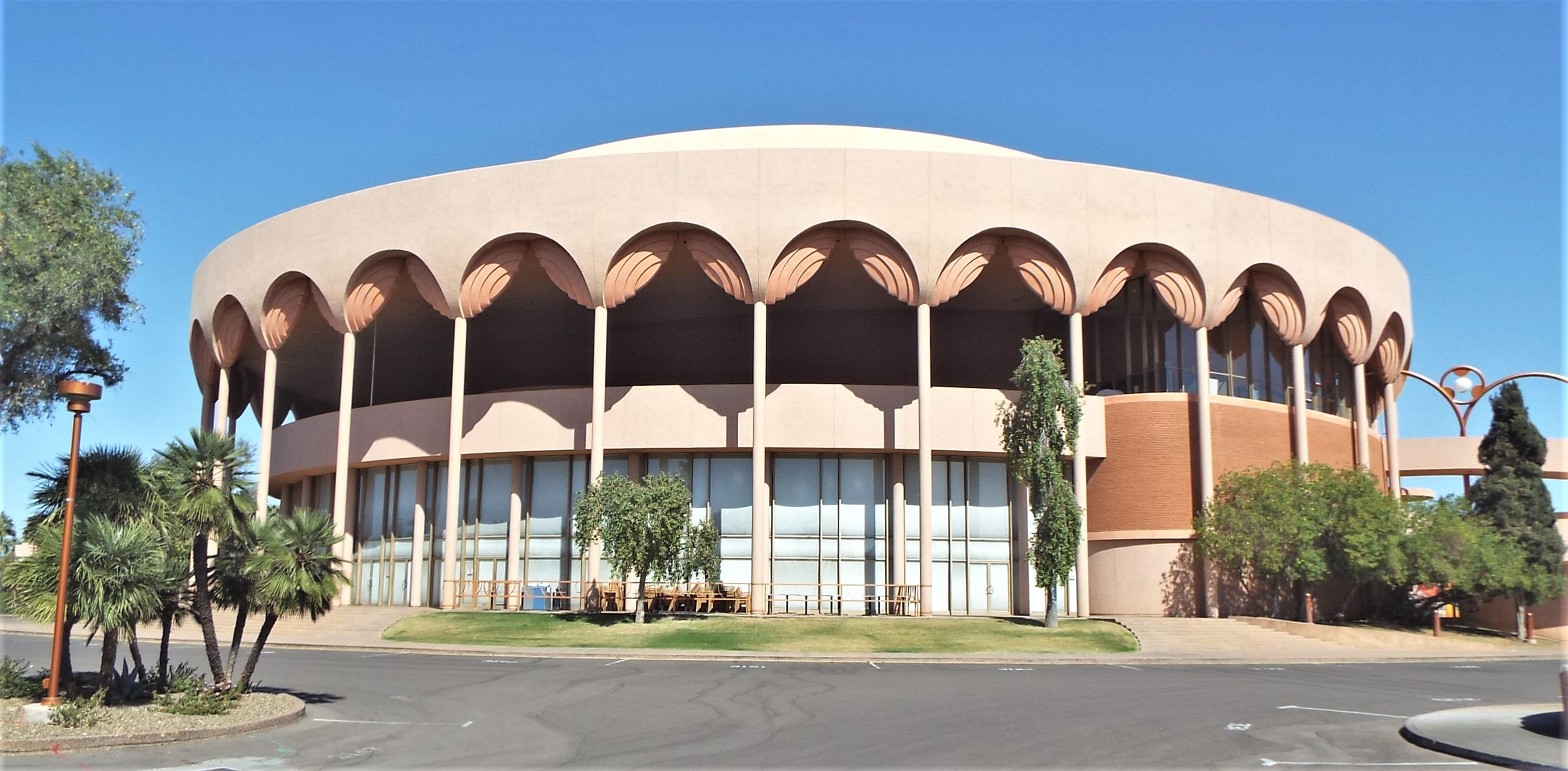
- From the southeast (2016)
- Interactive map of ASU Gammage
- Address: 1200 South Forest Avenue; Tempe, Arizona; United States
- Owner: Arizona State University
- Capacity: 3,017

Construction
- Groundbreaking: 1962
- Opened: September 18, 1964
- Architect: Frank Lloyd Wright
- General contractor: Robert E. McKee Company

Tenant
- Broadway Across America

Website
- www.asugammage.com
- Grady Gammage Memorial Auditorium
- U.S. National Register of Historic Places
- Location within Arizona Location within the United States
- Coordinates: 33°24′58.67″N 111°56′17.08″W
- Architect: Frank Lloyd Wright
- Architectural style: Usonian
- NRHP reference No.: 85002170
- Added to NRHP: September 11, 1985

ASU Gammage (formerly known as Grady Gammage Memorial Auditorium) is a multipurpose performing arts center at 1200 South Forest Avenue at East Apache Boulevard in Tempe, Arizona, within the main campus of Arizona State University (ASU). The auditorium, which bears the name of former ASU President Grady Gammage, is considered to be one of the last public commissions of American architect Frank Lloyd Wright. It was built from 1962 to 1964.

ASU Gammage stands as one of the largest exhibitors of performing arts among university venues in the world, featuring a wide range of genres and events.

ASU Gammage was listed on the National Register of Historic Places in 1985.

== History ==
The process that led to construction of the auditorium began in 1957 when incumbent university President Grady Gammage desired a unique facility for the ASU campus. In 1956, a collapsed roof rendered the school's combination auditorium/gymnasium unusable. Gammage recruited his friend Frank Lloyd Wright to design the new building. He would, with various budget related alterations, base its design on a circular opera house that he had conceptualized for the city of Baghdad sometime prior upon the invitation of Iraqi King Faisal II. Plans for that opera house were abandoned after Faisal's assassination in the 14 July Revolution. Wright is also said to be responsible for siting the auditorium, selecting an athletic field at 1200 South Forest Avenue which had formerly held on-campus G.I. housing units.

Wright and Gammage both died in 1959, leaving Wright's protégé William Wesley Peters to undertake completion of the auditorium. Spearheaded by the Robert E. McKee Company, construction of the facility commenced in 1962 and was completed twenty-five months later, officially opening on September 18, 1964, in time to host The Philadelphia Orchestra conducted by Eugene Ormandy.

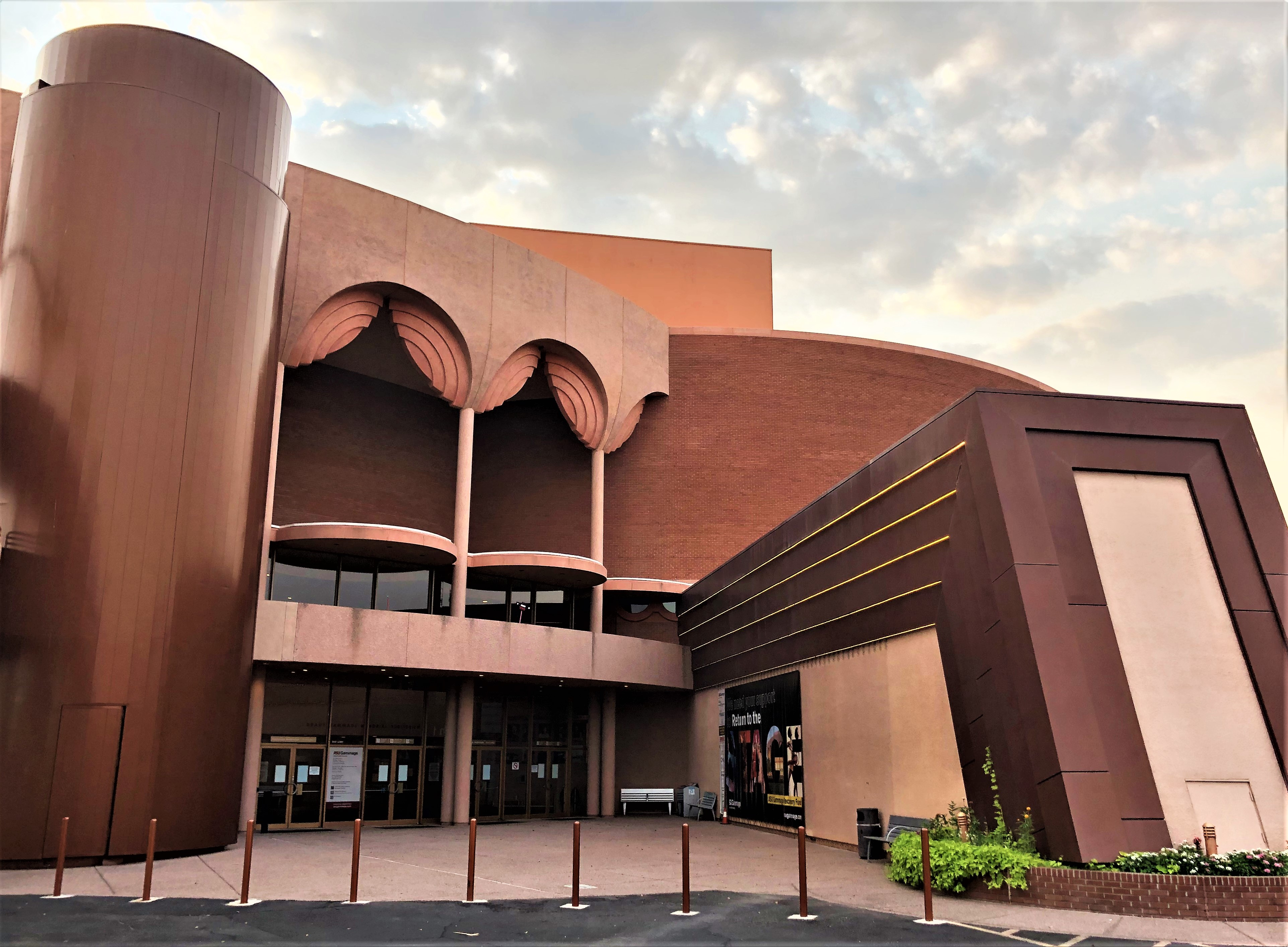
The east entrance

=== Notable events ===
The auditorium was used for the funeral of Arizona Senator and 1964 Republican presidential nominee Barry Goldwater on June 3, 1998.

On October 13, 2004, the auditorium was the site of the third and closing debate between George W. Bush and John Kerry in the 2004 U.S. Presidential Election.

== Structure ==
The structure measures 300 feet (91 m) long by 250 feet (76 m) wide by 80 feet (24 m) high. Fifty concrete columns support the round roof with its pattern of interlocking circles. Twin "flying buttress" pedestrian ramps extending 200 feet (61 m) from the north and east sides of the structure connect the building to the parking lot. The auditorium seats 3,017 people on its main floor, grand tier and balcony. The stage can be adapted for opera, theatricals, musicals, concerts, and lectures.

== Performance and other spaces ==
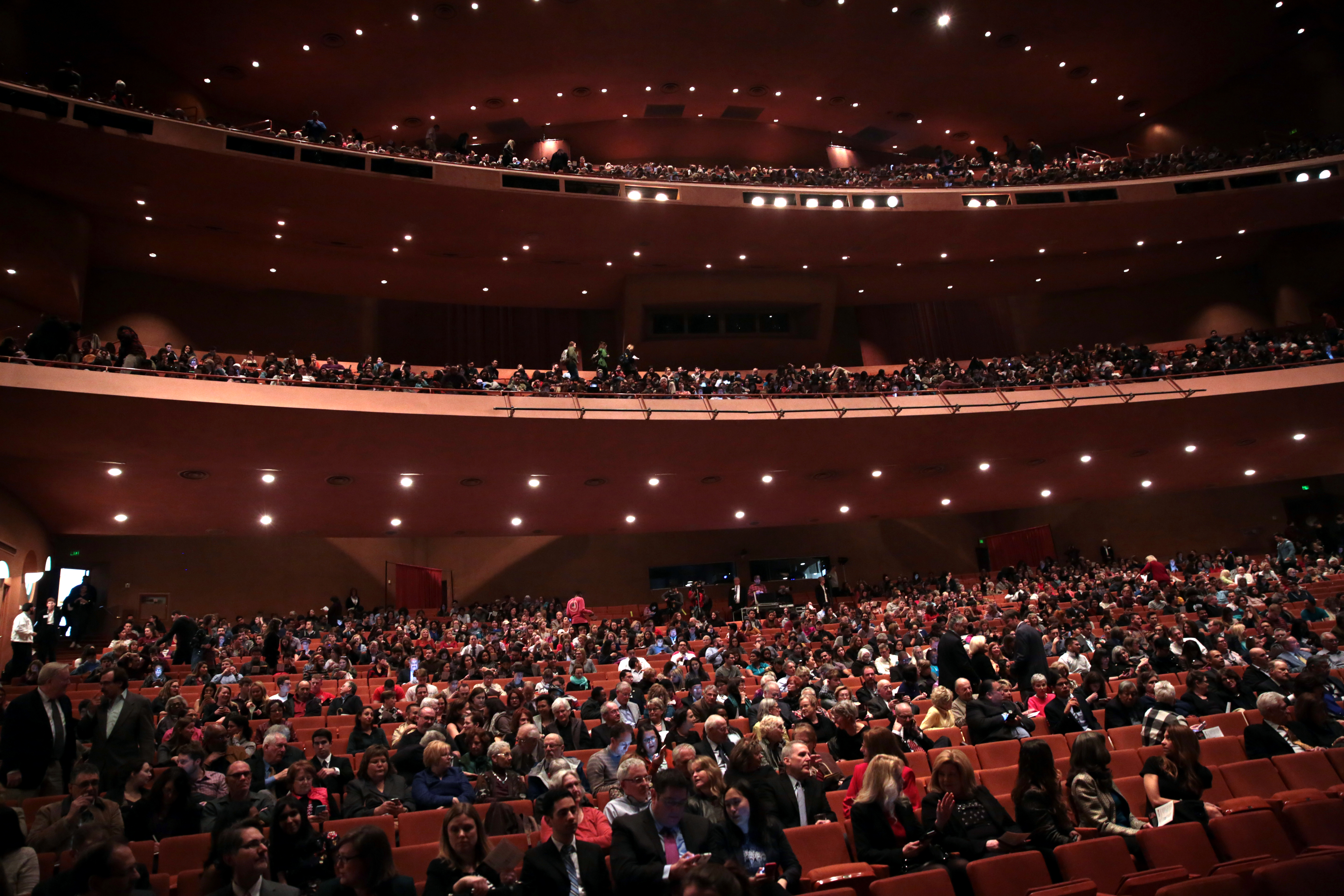
Distinctive cantilevered balconies

Auditorium

The auditorium has a maximum seating capacity of 3,017. It is wheelchair accessible and has an infrared system for 100 hearing-impaired people (in addition to signers).

Stage

- Type: proscenium
- Playing space dimensions: 64'x33' or 64'x40'
- Proscenium opening: 64'x30'
- Height grid/ceiling: 78'
- Floor type: Canadian hard rock maple
- Rigging system type: 58 double purchase, 40 hydraulic (98 lines total)

Backstage

- Loading dock
- Door dimensions: 10'x11'6"
- Dressing rooms: 9
- Maximum capacity: 54

Deck

Permanent installations: traps in stage, orchestra shell, hydraulic orchestra pit, electricity in pit, music stands, pianos

Pit

- Dimensions: 76'x9'
- Number of stands: 85
- Chairs for pit: 90

Electrics/Sound

- Building electrics current: 9 panels-3-600/3-200/2-100/1-100 = 2700 total
- Lighting board: computer memory
- Lighting equipment: 32-8x13, 22-10x12, 55-6x9, 30 8" Fresnels, 12 Par Cans, 12 Mini Strips

== See also ==
- List of Frank Lloyd Wright works
- Broadway Across America
