= United States Custom House (San Ysidro, California) =

- U.S. Inspection Station/U.S. Custom House
- U.S. National Register of Historic Places
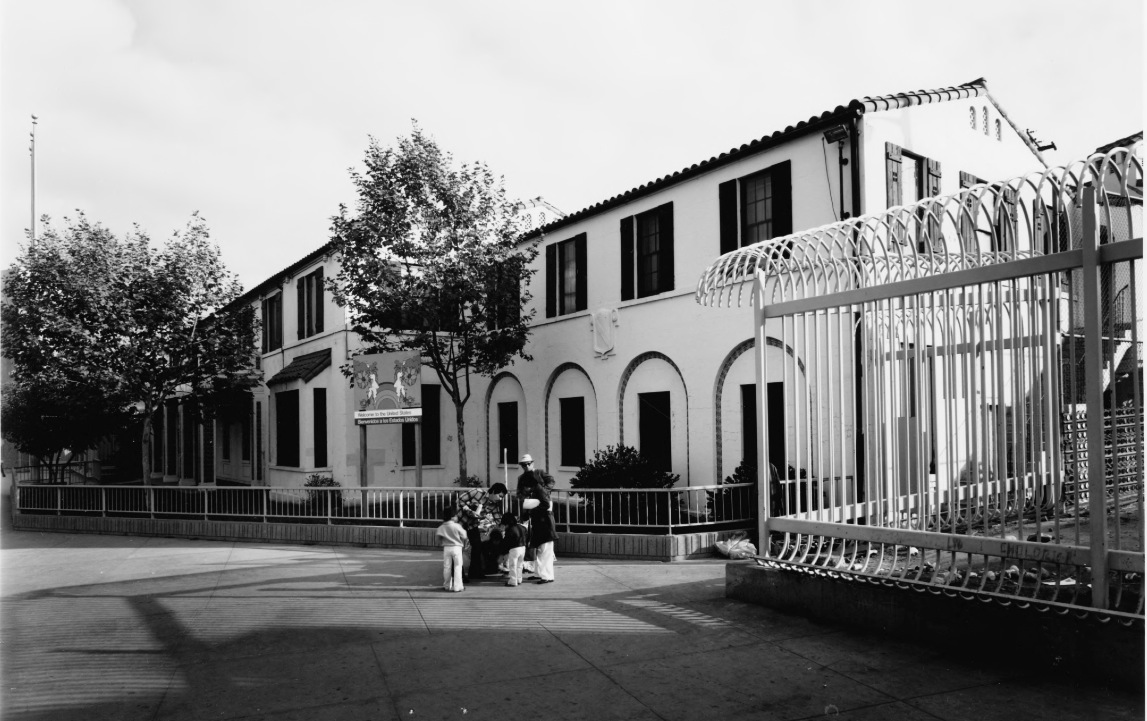
- U.S. Custom House in 1981, looking north at the west and south façades

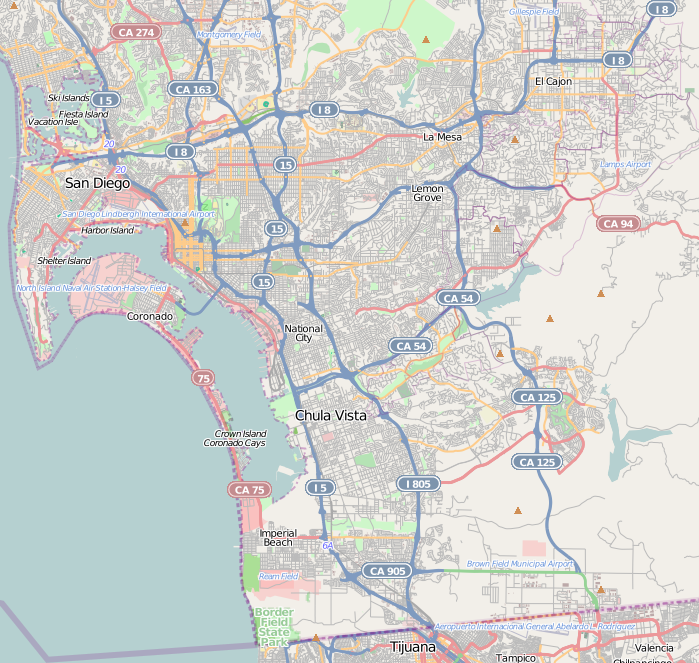
- Location within Southern San Diego
- Location: Virginia and Tijuana Sts., San Ysidro, California
- Coordinates: 32.5428°N 117.028°W
- Area: less than one acre
- Architect: Office of the Supervising Architect under James A. Wetmore
- Architectural style: Mission/Spanish Revival
- NRHP reference No.: 83001228
- Added to NRHP: February 10, 1983

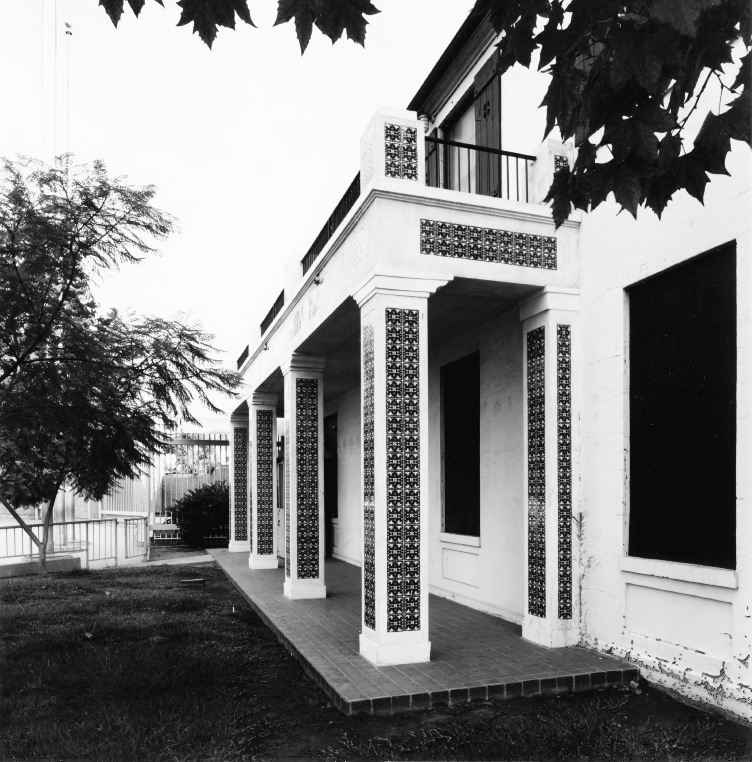
U.S. Custom House in 1981, detail of the porch on the west façade.

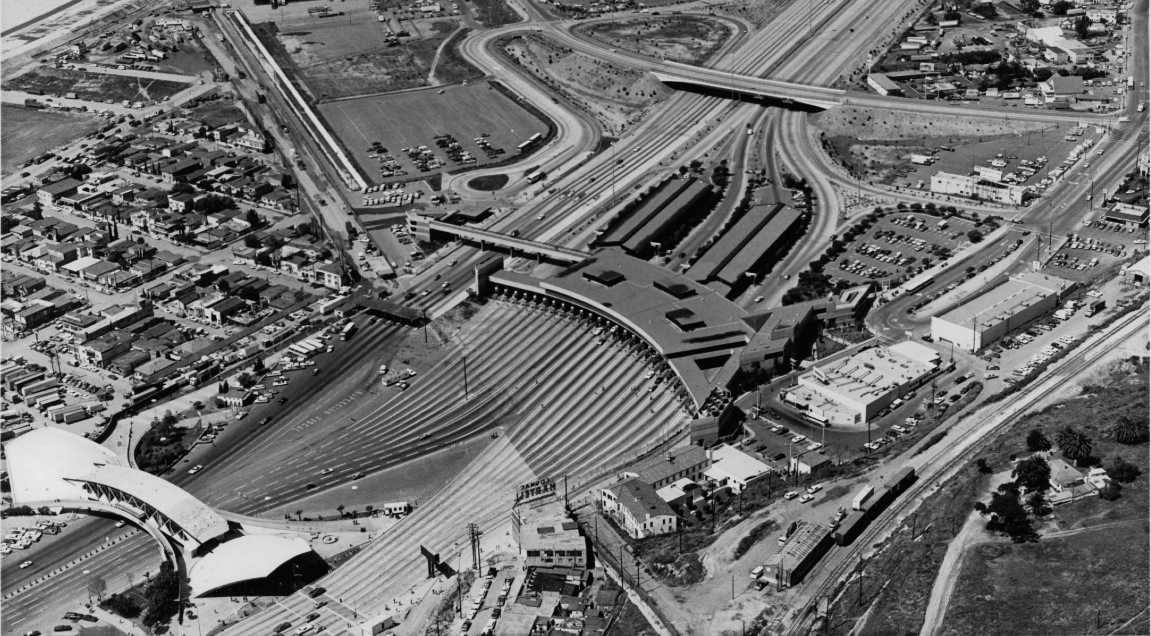
1981 aerial view of the San Ysidro Port of Entry. The U.S. Custom House is at the lower center.

The United States Custom House (also known as the Old Customs House) in San Ysidro, San Diego, California, is a 1933 Spanish Revival–style building located 50 feet (15 m) north of the Mexico–United States border at the San Ysidro Port of Entry. It is listed on the National Register of Historic Places with the full historic name U.S. Inspection Station/U.S. Custom House and common name U.S. Custom House.

== History ==
The Custom House was part of a large federal building program begun in 1926 during the Herbert Hoover administration in which 1,300 new federal buildings were constructed. The building was designed by the Supervising Architect's office of the Treasury Department; construction was performed by Robert E. McKee of El Paso, Texas, who was paid $93,800. Groundbreaking was in early summer 1932. In May 1933, the building was complete; it was quietly put into use without a formal dedication ceremony.

As traffic increased at the crossing over the decades, an additional building was added north of the 1933 facility. That new building was then replaced by much larger inspection and customs facilities to its west, completed in 1974 and still in use. After a period during which the ground floor of the Custom House was left empty, the ground floor once again houses offices of U.S. Immigration and Customs Enforcement (ICE).

== Significance ==
The building is considered important for two reasons, one political and one architectural. Politically, the building has played an important symbolic role in relations between Mexico and the United States at one of the busiest land border crossings in the world. Architecturally, it is considered a locally prominent example of the Spanish Colonial Revival architectural style as applied to a public building.
