= Payame Noor University =

University in Iran

- دانشگاه پیام نور
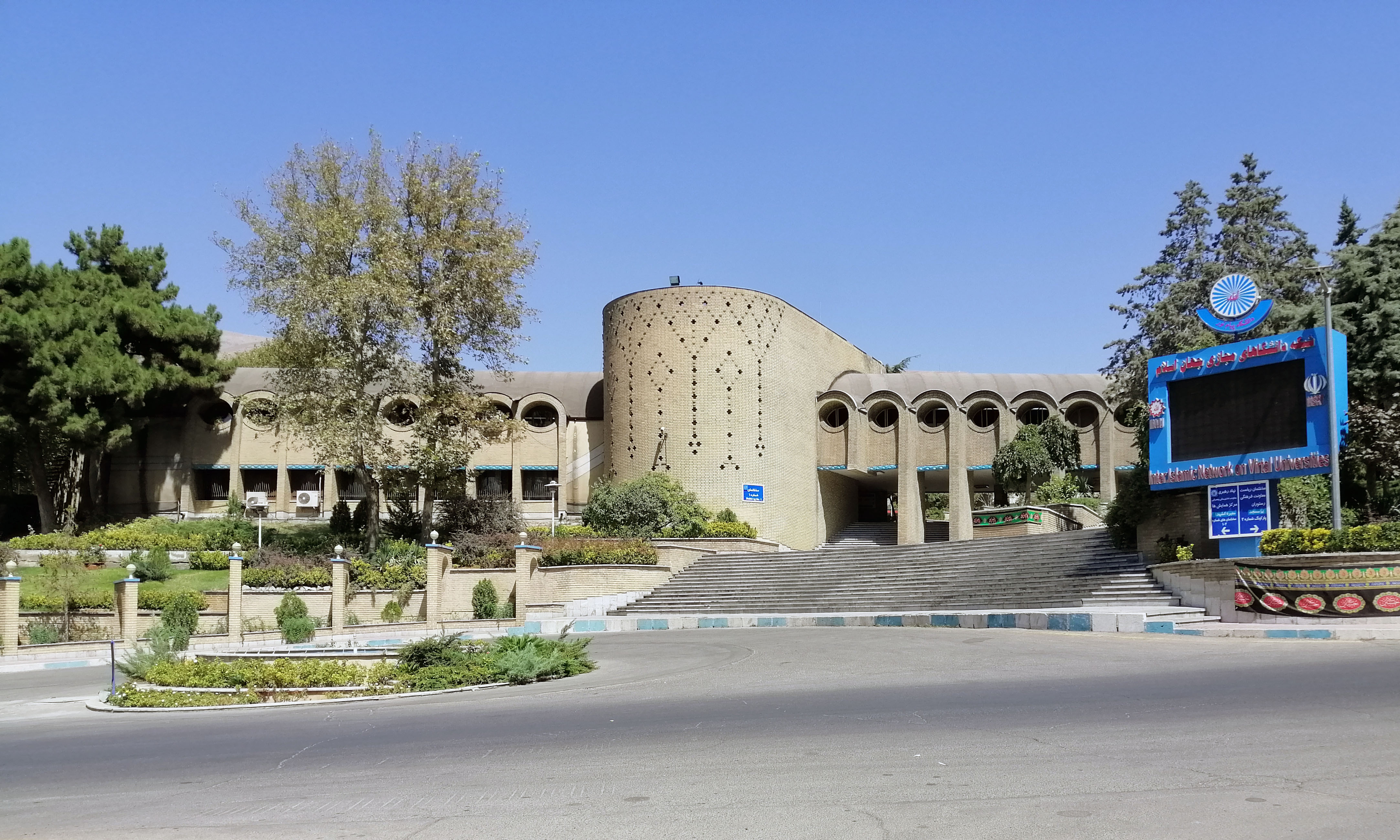
- Tehran main office of Payame Noor University, designed by Taliesin Associated Architects (Frank Lloyd Wright Foundation), William Wesley Peters
- Other names: Payam Noor University, Payam-e Noor University, PNU
- Former names: University of Abu Rayhan al-Biruni and Iran Azad University
- Motto: آموزش برای همه، هرجا و هر زمان
- Motto in English: Education for all, anywhere and anytime
- Type: Open university
- Established: 1988
- Affiliations: MSRT
- Academic affiliations: FUIW AAOU UNITWIN/UNESCO Eurasian Universities Union
- President: Mohammad Hadi Amin Naji
- Academic staff: 3,200. Including 444 professor and assistant professor
- Students: 430,000
- Location: Nakhl St, Lashkarak Highway, Tehran, Iran; 35°48′3″N 51°30′9″E
- Language: Persian
- Branch/Center: 31 provincial universities, with 502 urban branches/centers
- Colours: Yellow
- Sporting affiliations: FISU, AUSF, IUSF
- Website: pnu.ac.ir/

Payame Noor University (PNU; Persian: Dāneŝgāhe Payāme Nur) is an open university system in Iran, with its headquarters in Tehran. Established in 1988, it is a legal institution under the supervision of the Ministry of Science, Research and Technology of Iran government. Payame Noor means "the message of light" in Persian.

PNU was established in 1988 in the Iran, after having integrated the University of Abu Rayhan al-Biruni and Iran Azad University. PNU took its first intake in five-degree programs at 28 study centres. Because of the governmental/public type of this university, its tuition is the lowest among all of the non-public universities.

== Merger/downscaling ==
In August 2023, the Iranian government tried disbanding it in its entirety, but this was stopped before long. Iranian government program closed and/or merged several thousand universities. Some were turned into Technical and Vocational University, while others became part of state universities.

== History ==
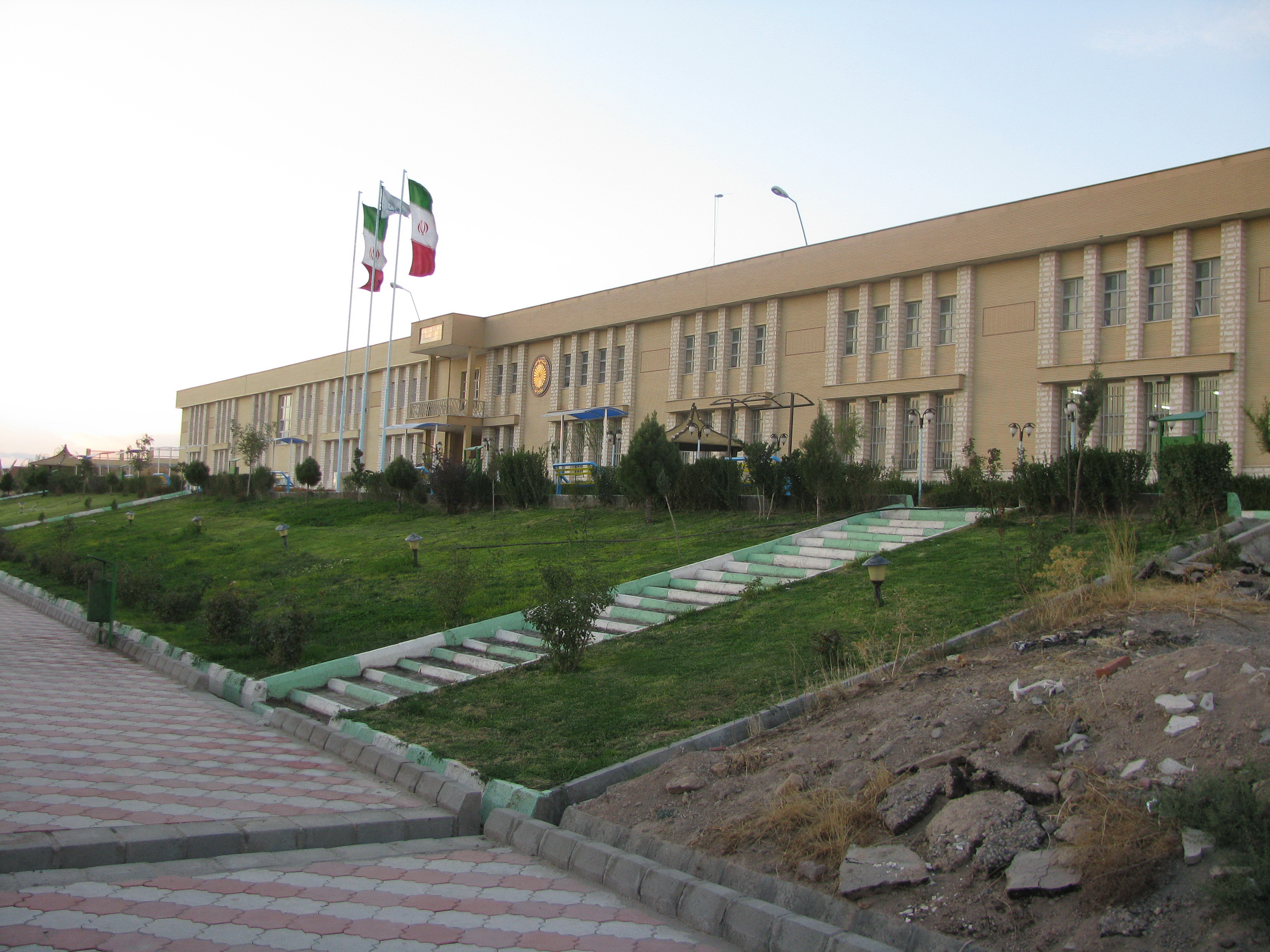
Payame Noor University of Maragheh

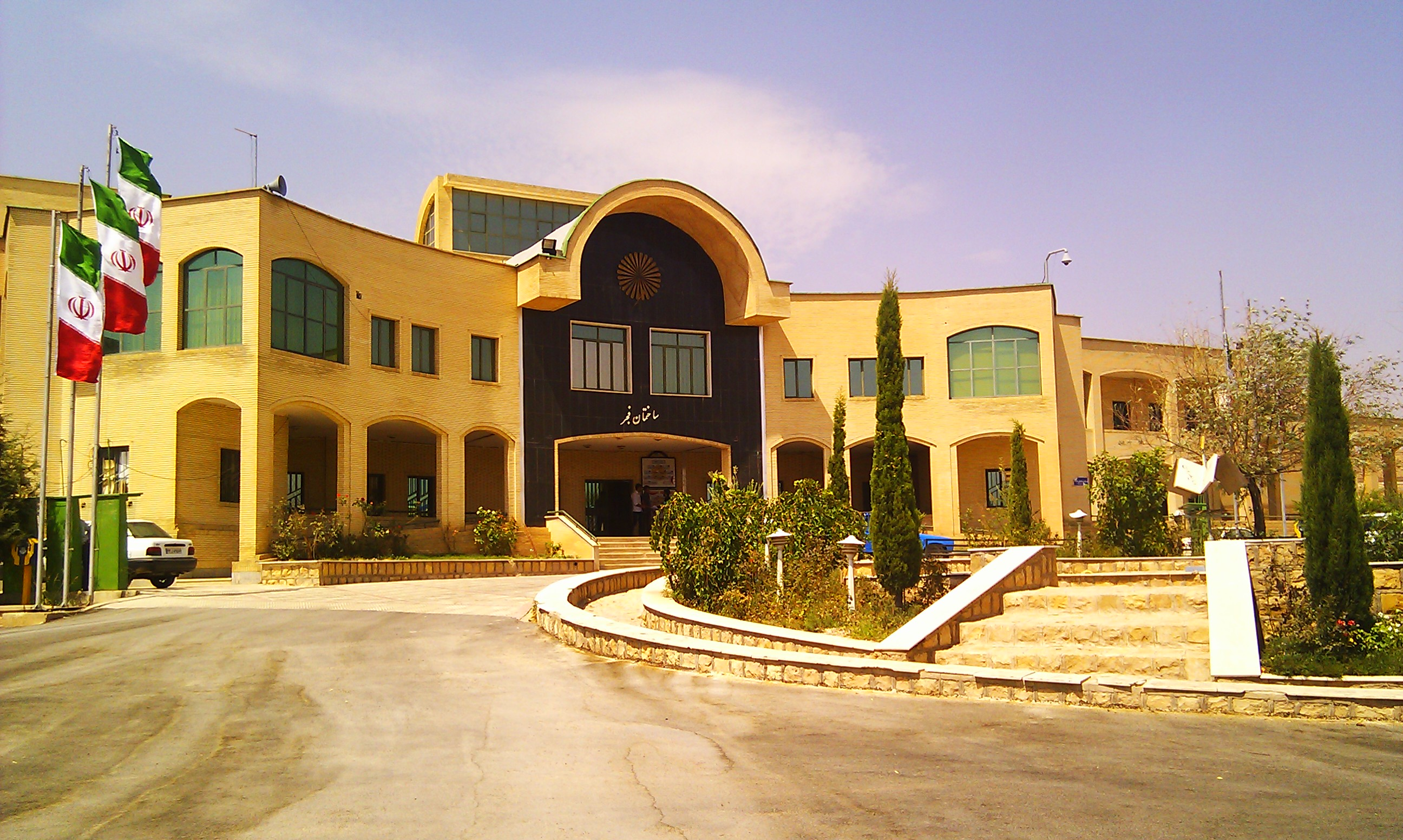
Payame Noor University of Shiraz

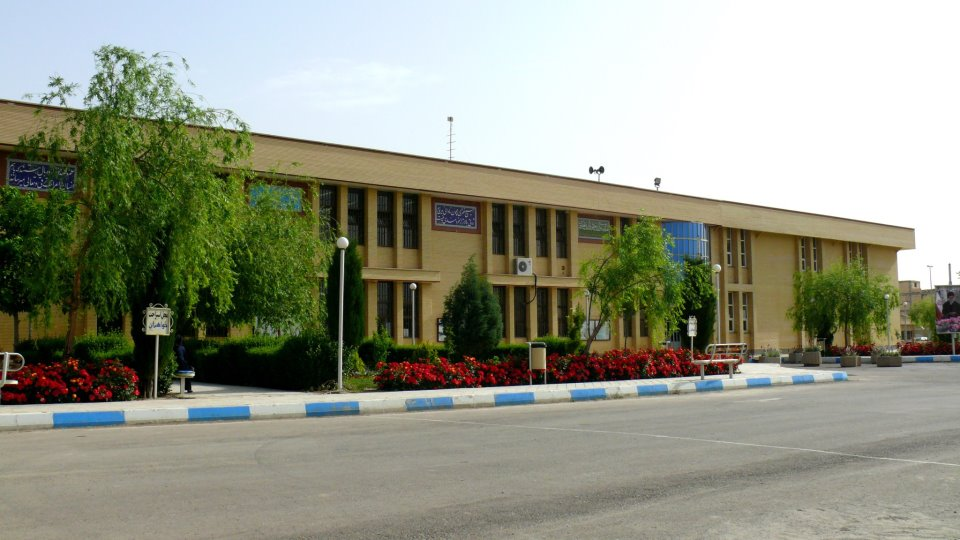
Payame Noor University of Shahin Shahr

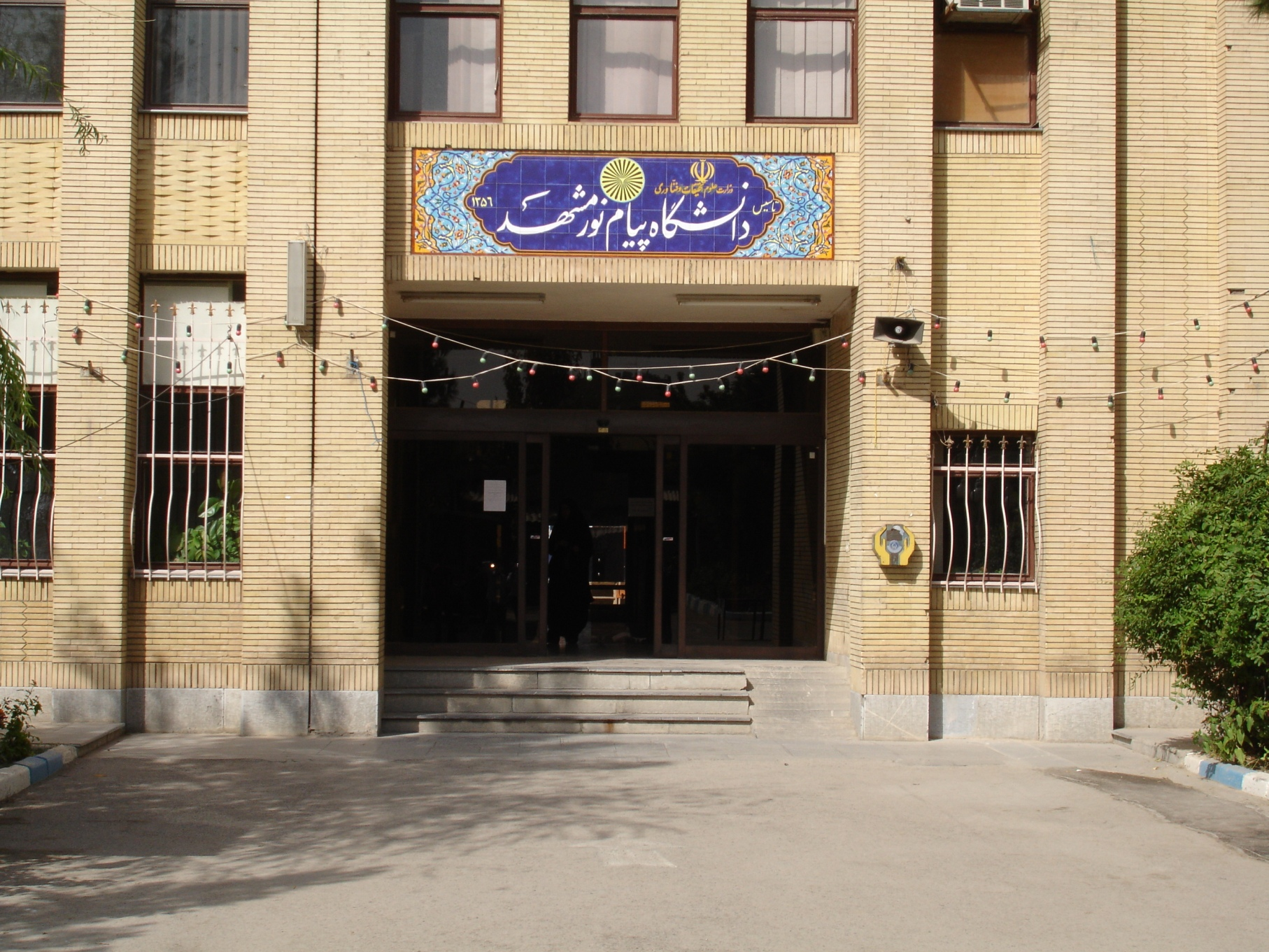
Payame Noor University of Mashhad

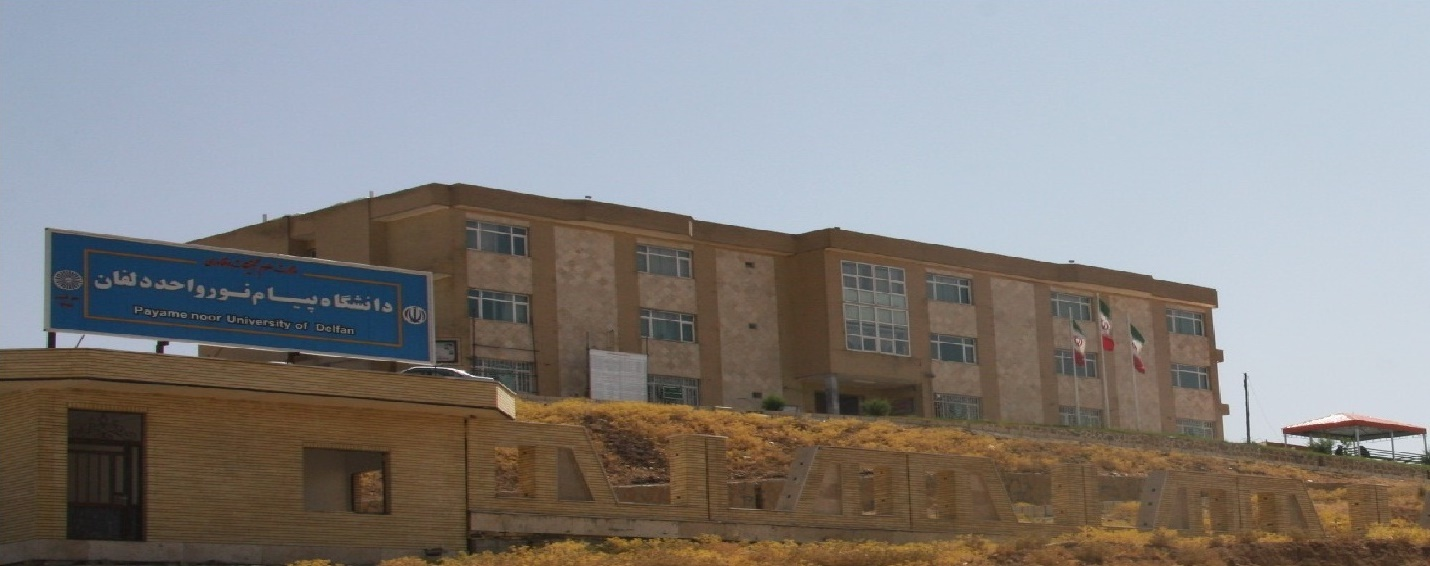
Payame Noor University of Delfan

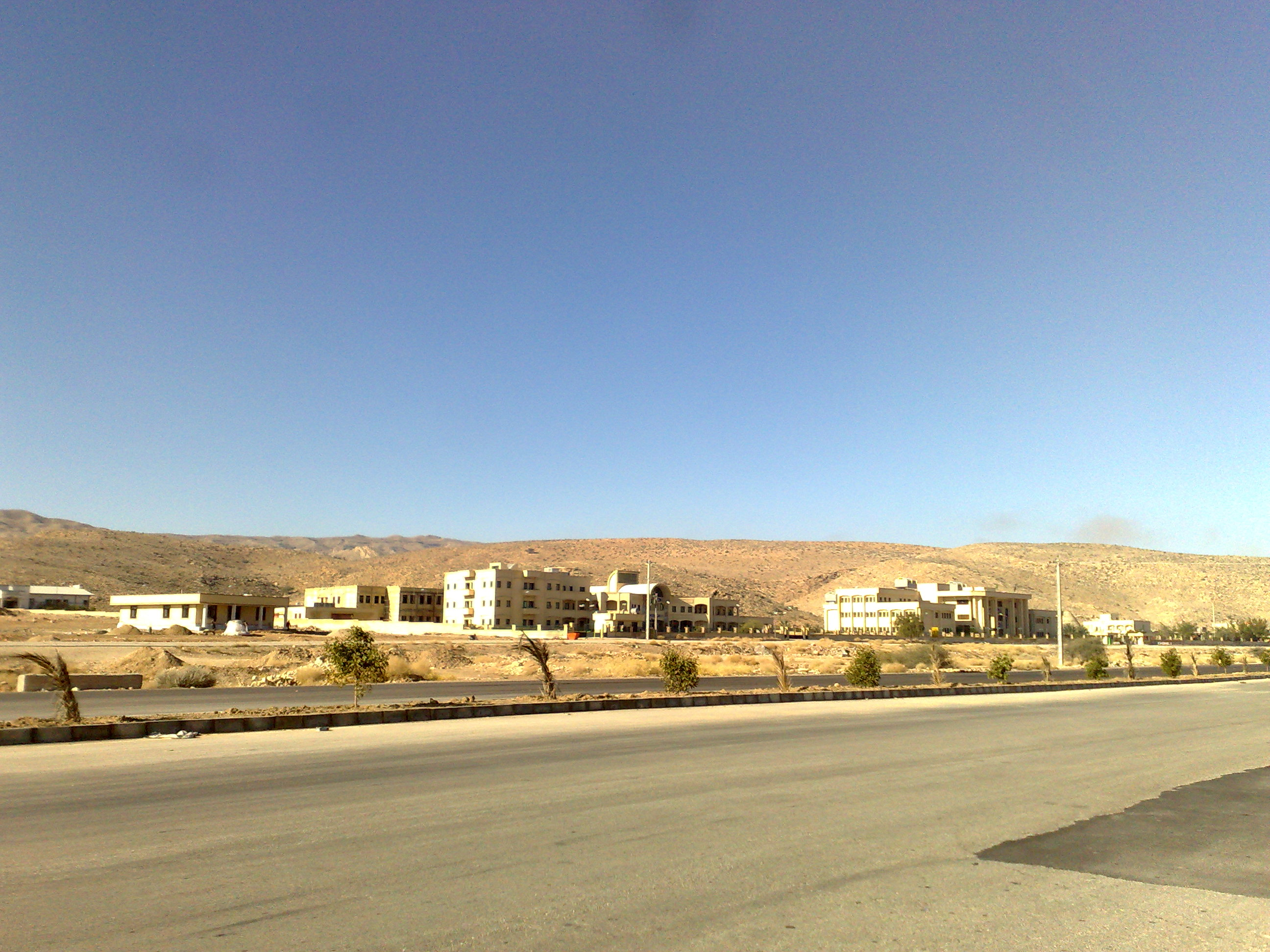
Payame Noor University of Evaz

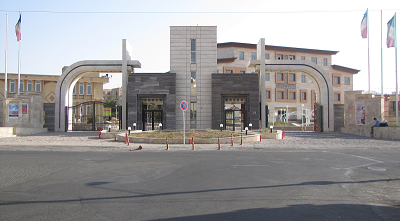
Payame Noor University of Zanjan

PNU was established by decisions based on the meetings (No. 94 & 97) in 1986 by SCCR (Supreme Council of the Cultural Revolution of Iran). PNU was established in 1988 in Iran, after the integration of the University of Abu Rayhan al-Biruni and Iran Free University.

One of Payame Noor University's Tehran campuses (which was previously Damavand College, or Damavand Higher Educational Institute) was completed in 1976 and is one of the three buildings in Iran designed and built by Taliesin Associated Architects (Frank Lloyd Wright Foundation) and William Wesley Peters.

== About ==
Payame Noor University is one of the large and prestigious public universities in Iran. It is a global mega university. The school has 502 campus locations in 2020.

PNU offers undergraduate degrees, postgraduate degrees and PhDs. Graduates of this university receive an official decree from the Ministry of Science, Research and Technology. The diplomas awarded to the students of this university are valid for continuing their studies in higher levels inside and outside the country, and employment in all government institutions and organizations.

Payame Noor University signed a memorandum of cooperation in the national plan to strengthen and identify children and adolescents in the field of coding. PNU is also holding the second general assembly of the network of virtual universities in the Islamic world.

The education system, like the Iranian higher education system, has two semesters and one summer semester. However, the educational calendar in PNU Afghanistan is different, according to the regulations of that center.

=== Admissions ===
In Iran, admission to college is competitive and only top students may achieve this honour. Undergraduate and graduate prospective students are admitted at the Iranian public university on the basis of their GPA and the National University Entrance Exam result.

=== Affiliations ===
Expanding the exchange of scientific information with universities and international research associations is one of the goals of Payame Noor University. The National Islamic Comprehensive of India, Islamic and International Multimedia of Malaysia, Tishrin, Aftarah and Damascus Syria. The university is also an active member of several international scientific associations, such as the Asian Association of Open Universities (AAOU), the International Council for Open and Distance Education (ICDE), Organisation of Islamic Cooperation (OIC), UNITWIN/UNESCO, Iran National Science Foundation (INSF), and the Federation of the Universities of the Islamic World (FUIW), Islamic World Educational, Scientific and Cultural Organization (ICESCO).

PNU is the UNESCO Chair on Environmental Education. Payame Noor University, as the first university in Iran, designed and implementated an environment training and education course in master's degree from 2008 with 500 graduating students. It also designed and implemented an Environmental Education Ph.D. course in 2012 with 40 Ph.D. candidates.

Payam Noor University is a member of UNITWIN, the university twinning and networking scheme. This UNESCO program was established in 1992. The UNITWIN/UNESCO Chairs Program consists of the establishment of UNESCO chairs and UNITWIN networks in higher education institutions. The UNITWIN/UNESCO Chairs Program promotes international inter-university cooperation and networking to enhance institutional capacities through knowledge sharing and collaborative work. The program supports the establishment of UNESCO chairs and UNITWIN networks in key priority areas related to UNESCO's fields of competence – i.e. in education, the natural and social sciences, culture and communication.

Through this network, higher education and research institutions all over the globe pool their resources, both human and material, to address pressing challenges and contribute to the development of their societies. In many instances, the networks and chairs serve as think tanks and as bridge builders between academia, civil society, local communities, researchers and policy-makers. They have proven useful in informing policy decisions, establishing new teaching initiatives, generating innovation through research and contributing to the enrichment of existing university programs while promoting cultural diversity.

As of May 2017, about 700 chairs are established within the program around the globe in 116 countries covering about 70 disciplines. There are presently 24 UNESCO chairs in the field of environmental education and education for sustainable development. In March 2017 Payame Noor University as the 14th UNESCO chair in Iran was selected by UNESCO to establish a chair in the field of Environmental Education especially in the regard of waste management for four years. Dr. Seyed Mohammad Shobeiri was selected as chair holder and leads the program.

=== Student life ===
Payame Noor University has sports, religious, and cultural centers and extracurricular activities, and tries to direct the potential energy of the youth in the right directions.

Payame Noor University has also an analytical news agency, known an UPNA.

PNU has more than 21 student scientific associations.

=== Publishing ===
The Payame Noor University Conference System is an online system that helps Payame Noor University Centers to hold their scientific conferences at the international, national and regional levels without having to worry about conflicts with traditional methods of receiving articles and judging them. This system manages all the stages of holding a conference, from launching the website and informing, to registering and receiving papers.

About 2700 books were published at the editorial office from 1988 to 2018.

Key Rankings for Payame Noor University:

U.S. News & World Report 2024-2025: Ranked #2074 in Best Global Universities and #57 in Iran.

CWUR World University Rankings 2025: Ranked #33 in Iran and #1693-1700 globally, placing it in the top 8.3% of universities worldwide.

QS Asian University Rankings 2026: Ranked #1101-1200 in Asia and #362 in Southern Asia.

Times Higher Education (THE) 2025: Ranked in the 1501+ category globally and 801-1000th for "Quality Education".

== Controversies ==
Iranian universities faced criticism in early 2007 about their treatment of students who follow the Baháʼí Faith. Although religious identification has been removed from entrance exam papers, the state sanctioned persecution of Baháʼís has led to students reportedly being expelled once their religion is discovered. The controversy specifically focused on Payame Noor University when an official university letter confirmed the expulsion as government policy. Over 30 Baháʼí students have been expelled under the policy.

Additionally, in 2008, the university declared that Arabic would be the "second language" of the university and that all its services would be offered in Arabic, concurrent with Persian.

PNU has been accused of being part of Iran's "publication bazaar," with local politicians and diplomats receiving advanced degrees without efforts or attendance.

== Locations ==
As of 2020, PNU has 502 campuses, which include locations in Iran and globally.

=== Nationwide locations ===
- Tehran Headquarters: Nakhl St, Lashkarak Highway, Tehran 19569
- Karaj: Dāneshgāh Boulevard, Gohardasht, Karaj, Alborz Province, Iran
- Shiraz: Lashkarak Road, PO Box 19395–4697, Shiraz, Fars Province, Iran
- Zanjan: Imamat Street, Russell Square, Zanjan, Zanjan Province, Iran

=== Global locations ===
- Azerbaijan: Baku, Khatai zone, Nobel 14, Walie Asr Educational complex, Embassy of I.R. of Iran, PNU University Building
- Erbil, Kurdistan: Fazel miranist, Shoresh
- Milan, Italy: Milano mantova strada cisa, N. 99
- Tajikistan: Dushanbe, Nemat Gharbayov 5,21 House
- Turkey: Şenlikköy Mahallesi, Hürriyet Caddesi, Karabay Apt. A Blok, No. 3/2, Florya, Bakirköy, Istanbul, Turkey
- Oman: Muscat, Al-Arabia zone, 3060 AV., No 302
- Qatar: Dafnah, cultural consultation of I.R. of Iran
- Kuwait: Salemia, Abuzar ghafari Av., Unit 12, No 6
- Georgia: 1 a Evgeni Mikeladze str., 0159, Tbilisi, Georgia
- Malaysia: c8-3 dataran palma ampangpoint jalanan ampong selangor
- France: Paris - Numéro 11 Rue PACHE
- Canada: 1120 7905 Bayview Ave, Thornhill, Ontario L3T 7n3
Payam Noor University and its many campuses

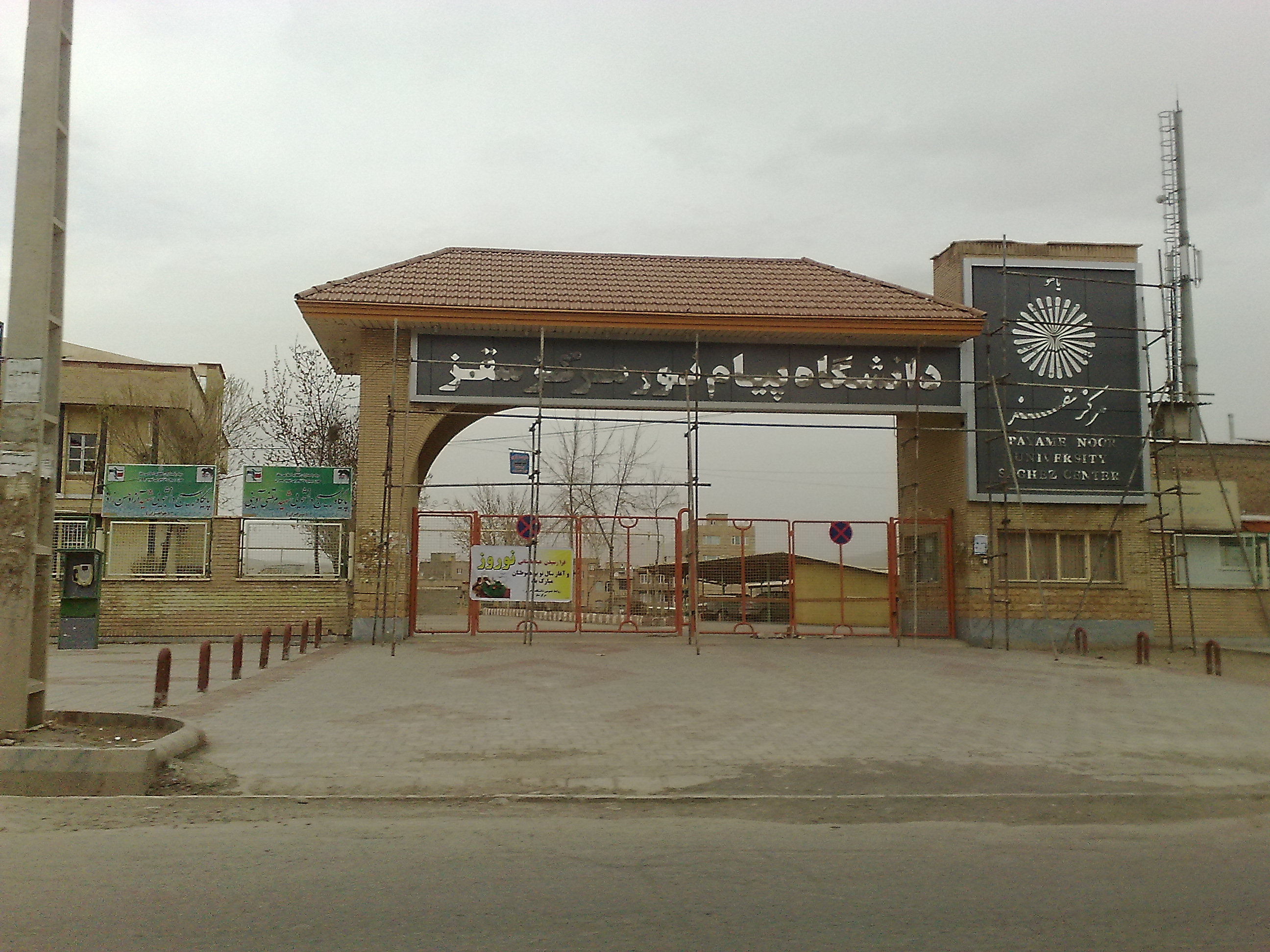
Payame Noor University of Saqqez

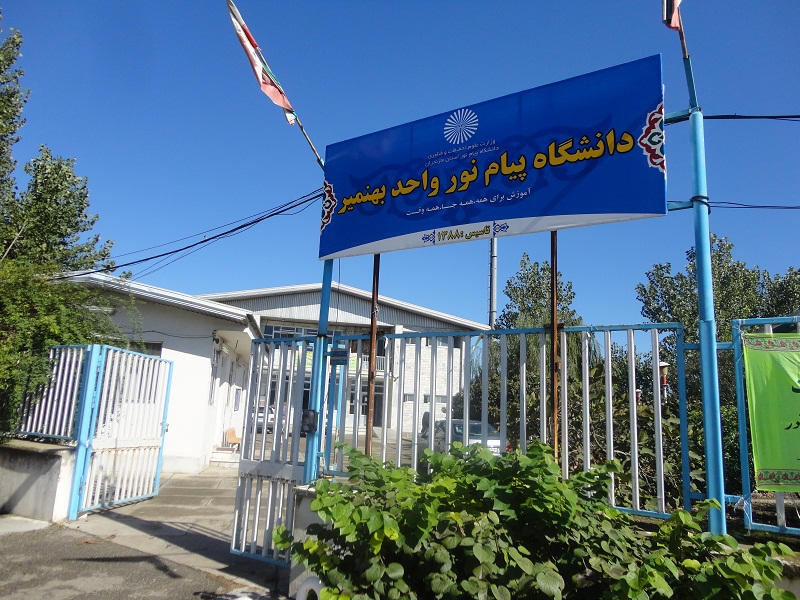
Payame Noor University of Bahnemir

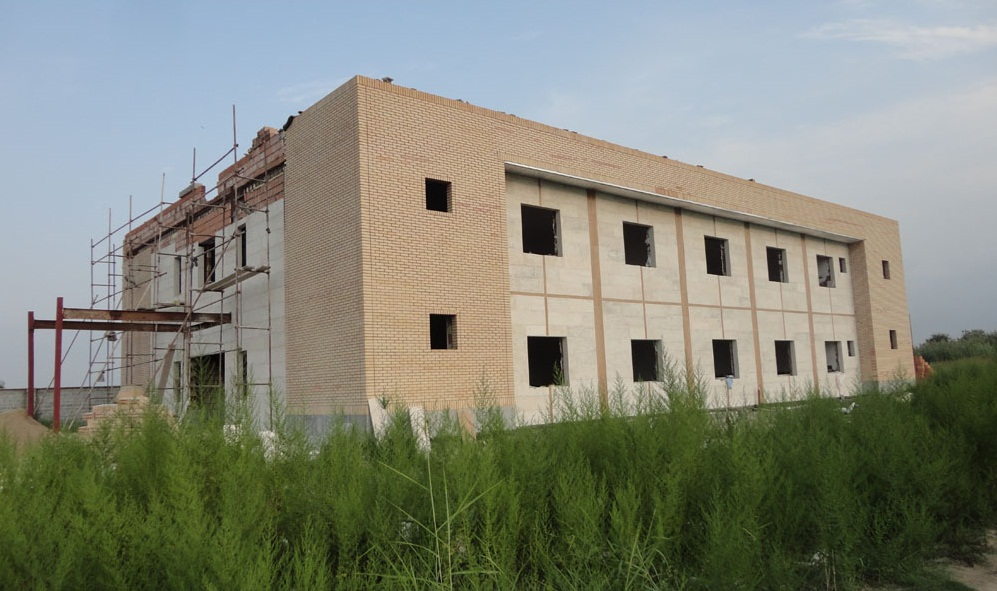
Payame Noor University of Bahnemir under construction

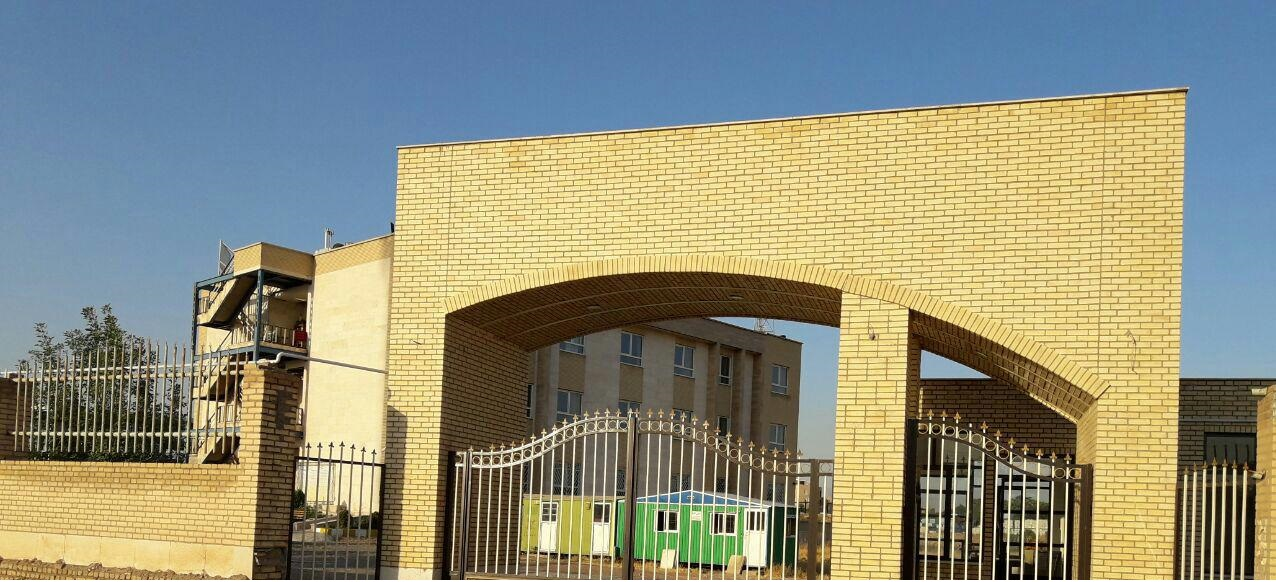
Payame Noor University of Alvand

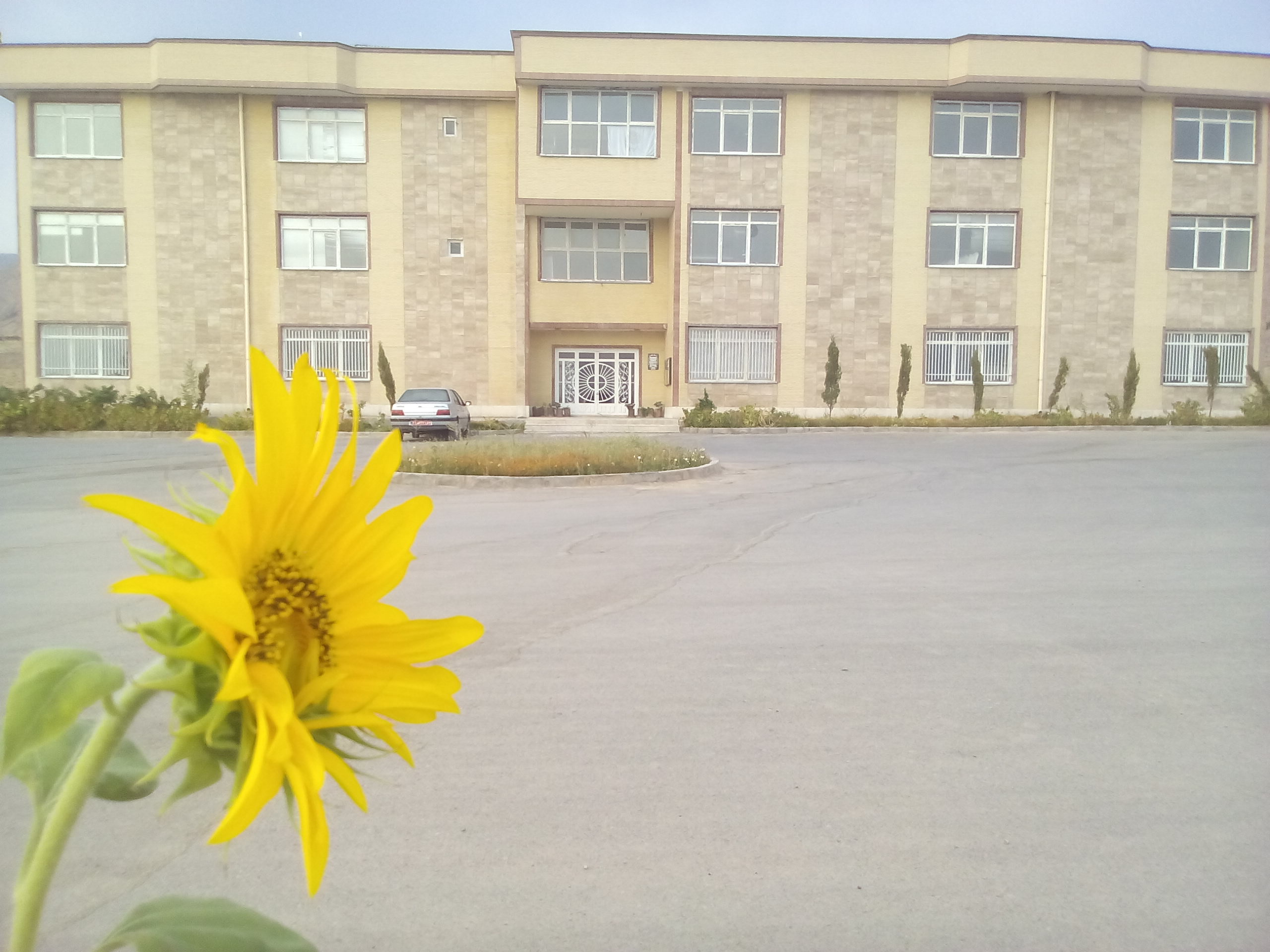
Payam Noor University of Sarvestan

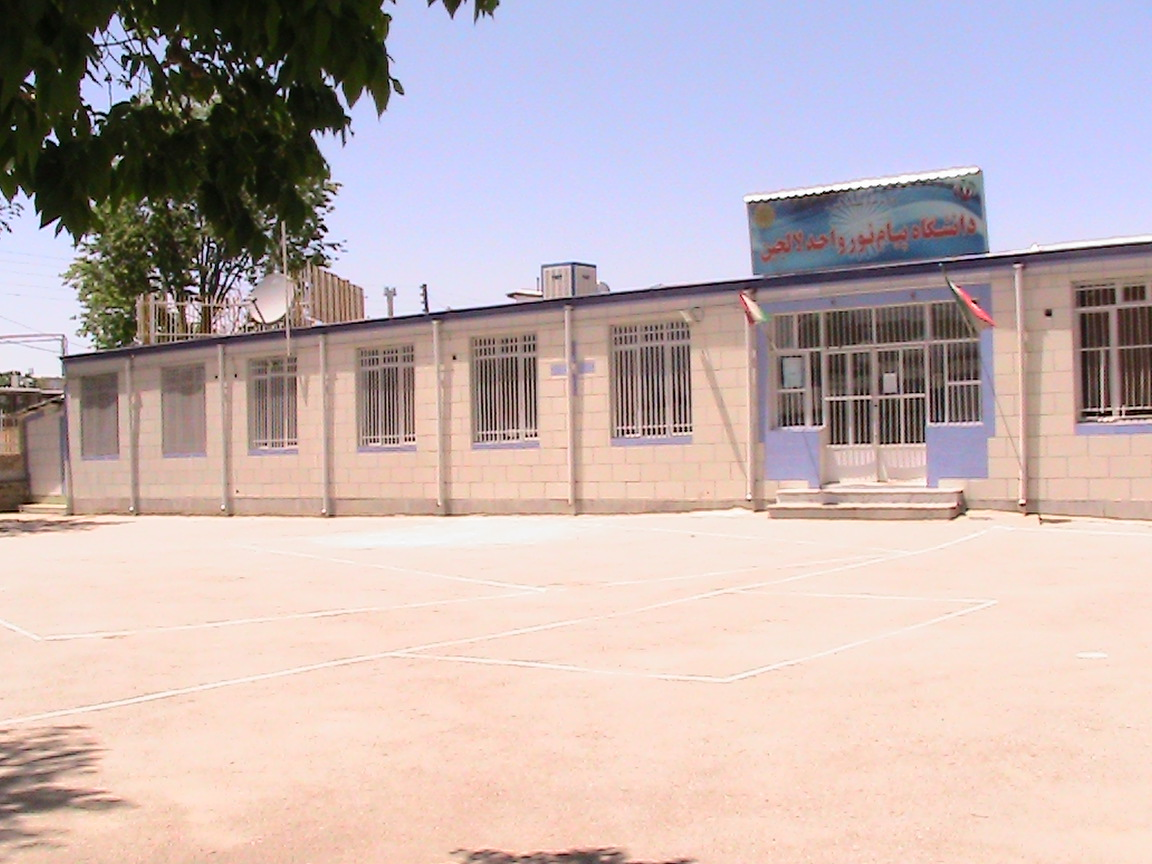
Payame Noor University of Lalejin

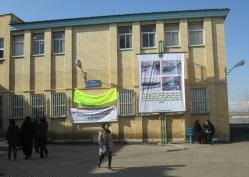
Payame Noor University of Ardabil

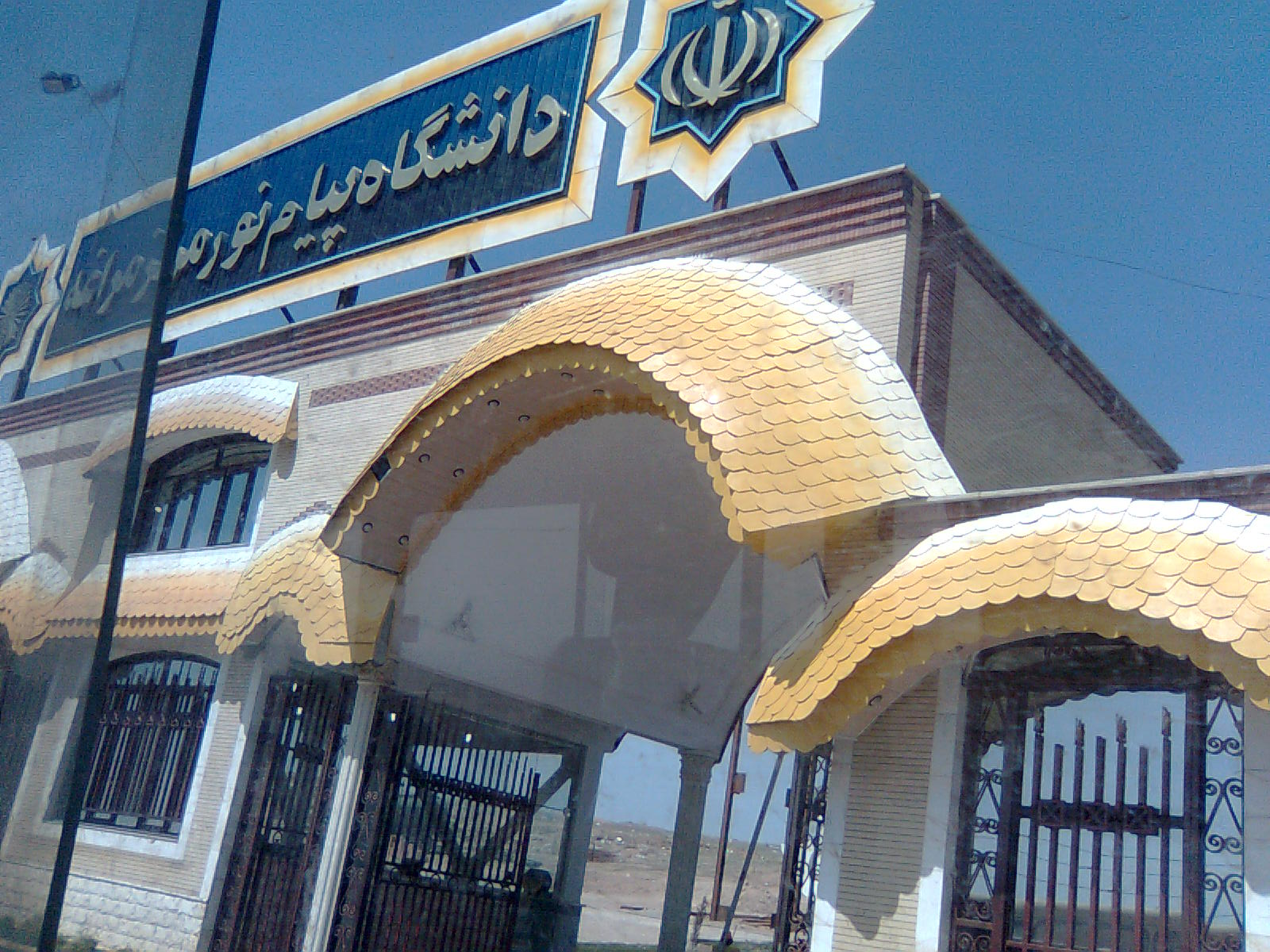
Payame Noor University of Maragheh

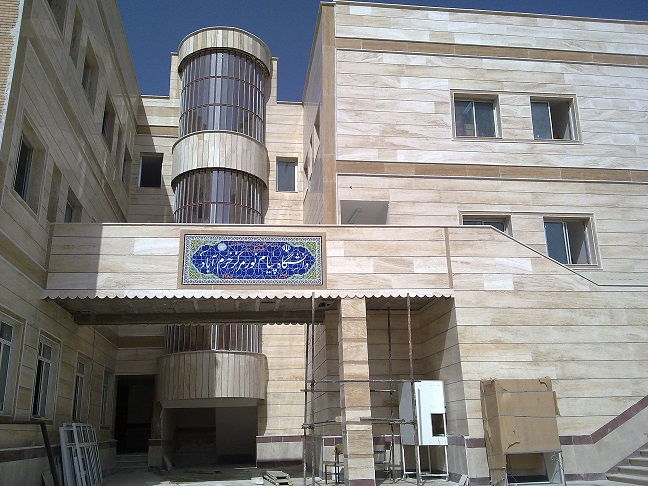
Payame Noor University of Khoram Abbad

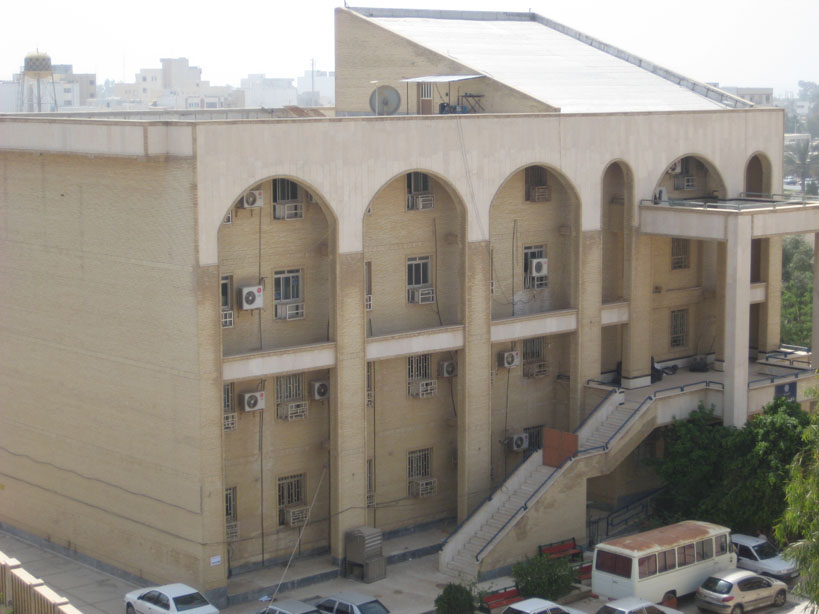
Payame Noor University of Boushehr - Administrative Building

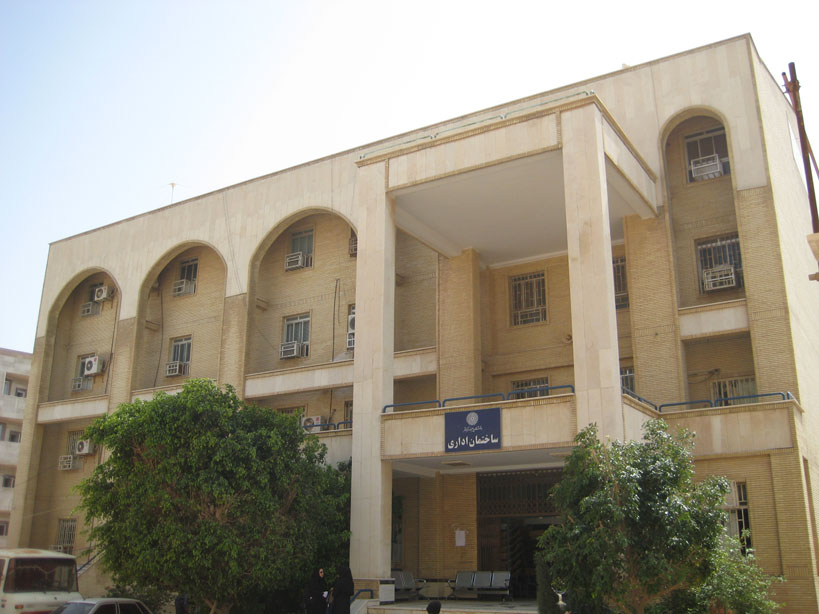
Payame Noor University of Boushehr - Administrative Building

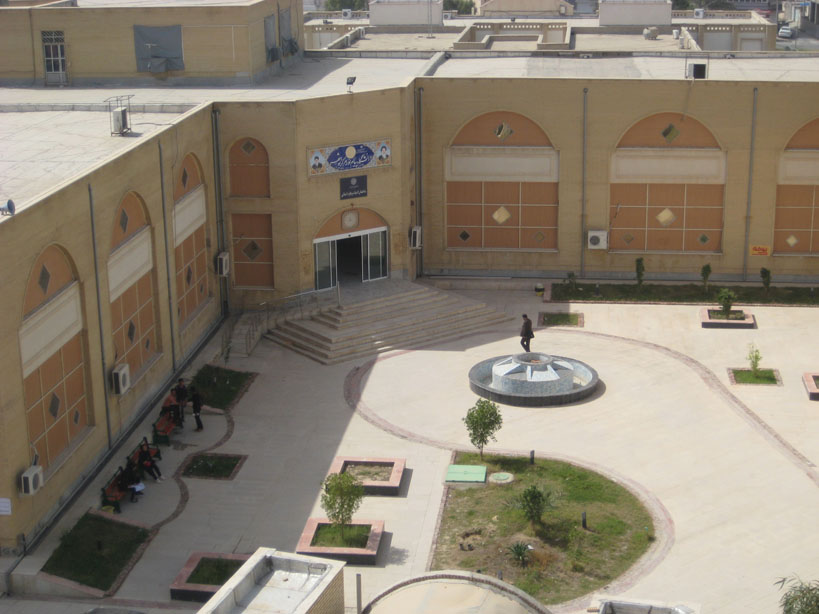
Payame Noor University of Boushehr - Literature and Humanities Science Faculty

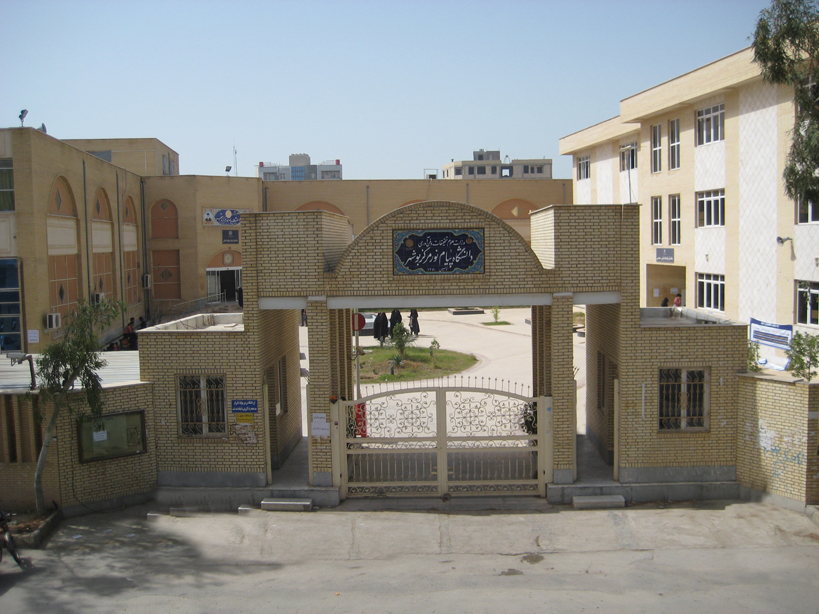
Payame Noor University of Boushehr - entrance

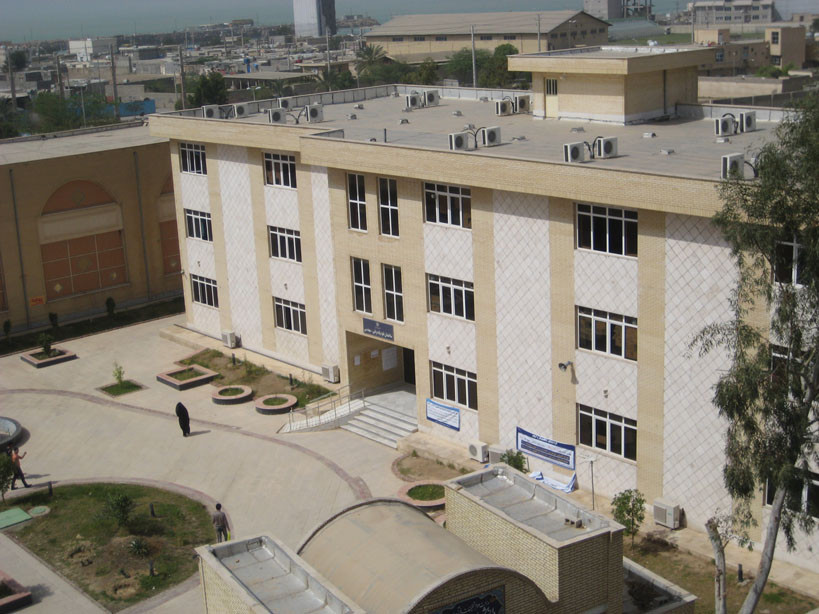
Payame Noor University of Boushehr - Engineering Faculty

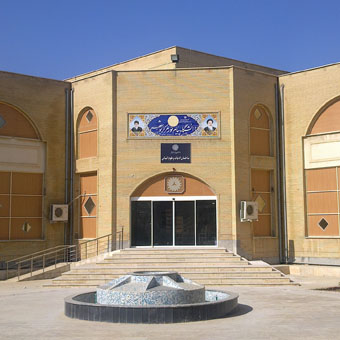
Payame Noor University of Boushehr - Literature and Humanities Science Faculty

== See also ==
- List of Islamic educational institutions
- Islamic Azad University
- Higher education in Iran
- List of universities in Iran
