= American Musical Theatre of San Jose =

Former musical theatre company in California

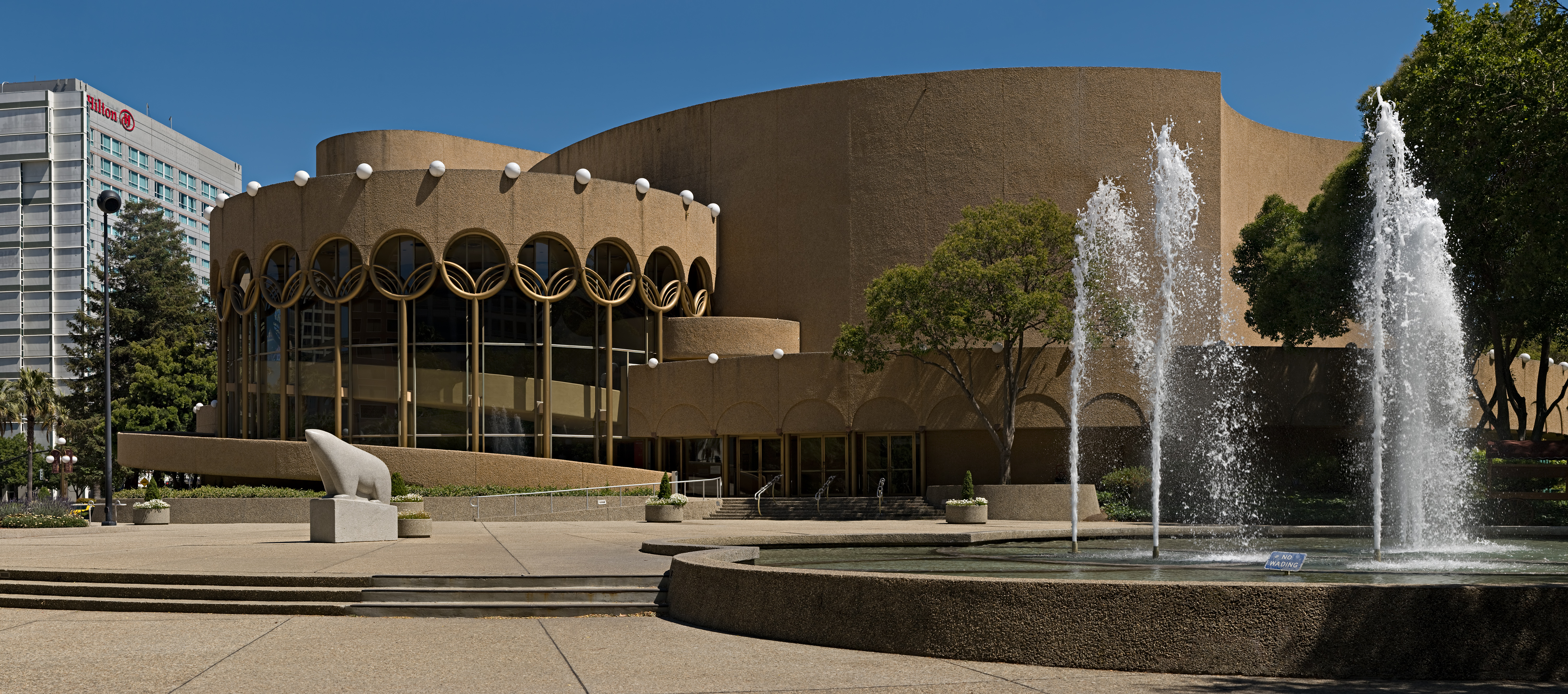
- AMTSJ performed at the San Jose Center for the Performing Arts in downtown San Jose.
- Formation: 1934
- Dissolved: 2008
- Type: Theatre group
- Purpose: musical theatre

The American Musical Theatre of San Jose (AMTSJ), previously known as the San Jose Civic Light Opera (SJCLO), was a major professional nonprofit musical theatre company in San Jose, California. Founded in 1934 as the San Jose Light Opera Association, it became the second largest theatre company in the Northern California (exceeded only by the American Conservatory Theater), with an annual budget of $9.8 million and an attendance exceeding 150,000, including 15,000 season ticket holders. The company performed at the 2,677-seat San Jose Center for the Performing Arts. The organization incurred debts after a 2002 agreement to become a receiving house for touring Broadway productions. It closed in December 2008.

== History ==
The American Musical Theatre of San Jose operated under four different names over its 74-year history:

=== San Jose Light Opera Association ===
In 1934, a group of community volunteers formed the San Jose Light Opera Association (SJLOA), performing works by Gilbert and Sullivan. The first production was The Mikado, held at the Victory Theatre on North First Street near Santa Clara Avenue in downtown San Jose, where they would perform for several more years. Shows were later held at Theodore Roosevelt Junior High School Auditorium, the Montgomery Theatre downtown, and then the Santa Clara University Theatre.

For the 1957/1958 season, SJLOA shifted from light opera to musical theatre, and performances were moved to the San Jose Civic Auditorium. The first productions in the new venue were Carousel and Guys and Dolls.

=== San Jose Music Theatre ===
In 1972, as the company continued to grow in popularity and success, SJLOA changed its name to San Jose Music Theatre (SJMT), in time for its move into the new San Jose Community Theatre (renamed in 1975 as the San Jose Center for the Performing Arts). To mark the occasion, SJMT hired its first Equity actor, Enzo Stuarti, for its production of South Pacific. The move to the new venue was delayed when the interior ceiling of the Community Theatre collapsed, closing the building for three years for repairs.

In 1975, SJMT finally debuted at the Center for Performing Arts with Guys and Dolls. That same year, SJMT began to contract much more Equity talent, including stars like Michele Lee, Tommy Tune, JoAnne Worley, Theodore Bikel, and Tyne Daly. The influx of Equity actors forced SJMT to begin a costume shop; before that, actors were responsible for making their own costumes. By 1979 SJMT was providing costumes for the entire cast.

The 1979/1980 season saw a downturn in the company's fortunes. The premiere of City of Broken Promises, based on the book of the same name by Austin Coates, ran so far over budget that SJMT faced bankruptcy. The President of the board resigned, and newly installed President Anthony J. Mercant demanded that each board member donate $500 or resign. The members complied, and this, coupled with a grant from Chevron, averted financial disaster.

=== San Jose Civic Light Opera ===
After the 1979/1980 season the board hired Stewart Slater as General Manager, ushering in a new era and another new name: the San Jose Civic Light Opera (SJCLO). In Slater, who had been general manager of American Conservatory Theater in San Francisco, the board chose someone from outside the organization and a proven business leader. Within two years of Slater's hiring, SJCLO once again had a balanced budget and began a streak of eight profitable seasons.

When Slater took over, the company relied heavily on star power to draw audiences. The big names were paid for at the expense of production quality; many of the supporting cast were unpaid volunteers. One of Slater's first acts was to end this practice, avoiding costly stars to bolster the quality of the entire production.

In 1984, thanks to a successful season ticket renewal campaign, the CLO had a rare surplus of $40,000 in advance ticket sales, prompting Slater to take an unprecedented risk for the organization. He hired a Chicago arts publicist, Danny Newman, to organize the largest direct mailing campaign ever done by an arts organization, spending the entire surplus. The gamble paid off, with the number of season ticket subscribers increasing by 10,000 within two years.

The Slater era saw steady growth in the company's reputation and attendance. Performances such as the critically acclaimed production of Jesus Christ Superstar in the 1989/1990 season and the widely successful restaging of Chess in 1991/1992 were considered notable achievements by Dianna Shuster, whom Slater had promoted to artistic director in 1985.

=== American Musical Theatre of San Jose ===
In 1995, the theatre changed its name again, this time to American Musical Theatre of San Jose, to commemorate its 60th anniversary.

In February 2002, AMTSJ announced an agreement with the Nederlander Organization, one of the largest operators of live theatre and music in the United States, allowing AMTSJ to present touring Broadway shows in the same season with locally produced shows. The move ended a 67-year era of exclusively locally produced works and led to the departure of artistic director Dianna Shuster.

Following the Nederlander agreement, single-ticket sales, subscriptions, and donations all plummeted, leading to a loss at least $2 million over two years, and to the departure of Slater after 24 years as executive producer. AMTSJ alumnus Michael Miller, the new executive producer, blamed the downturn on the community disconnect caused when the Nederlander agreement displaced local talent and on the struggling Silicon Valley economy. Upon his arrival from Paper Mill Playhouse in New Jersey, Miller launched a program to boost revenues with flexible ticket package offerings, extensive marketing, and aggressive fundraising. The plan paid off almost immediately, with AMTSJ showing over $500,000 of positive revenue for 2005, cutting debt by one third.

=== Bankruptcy and liquidation ===
On November 26, 2008, AMTSJ laid off all of its employees. The following week, it filed for Chapter 7 bankruptcy and ended operations. Miller announced that the sudden failure was due to a $1.7 million loss on an adaptation of Disney's musical Tarzan in partnership with Theatre of the Stars in Atlanta, Georgia. Miller called legal action against Theater of the Stars "likely" and claimed that money given to Theater of the Stars by AMTSJ for Tarzan was diverted for other purposes.
