= Snow Flake Motel =

- Formerly listed on the U.S. National Register of Historic Places
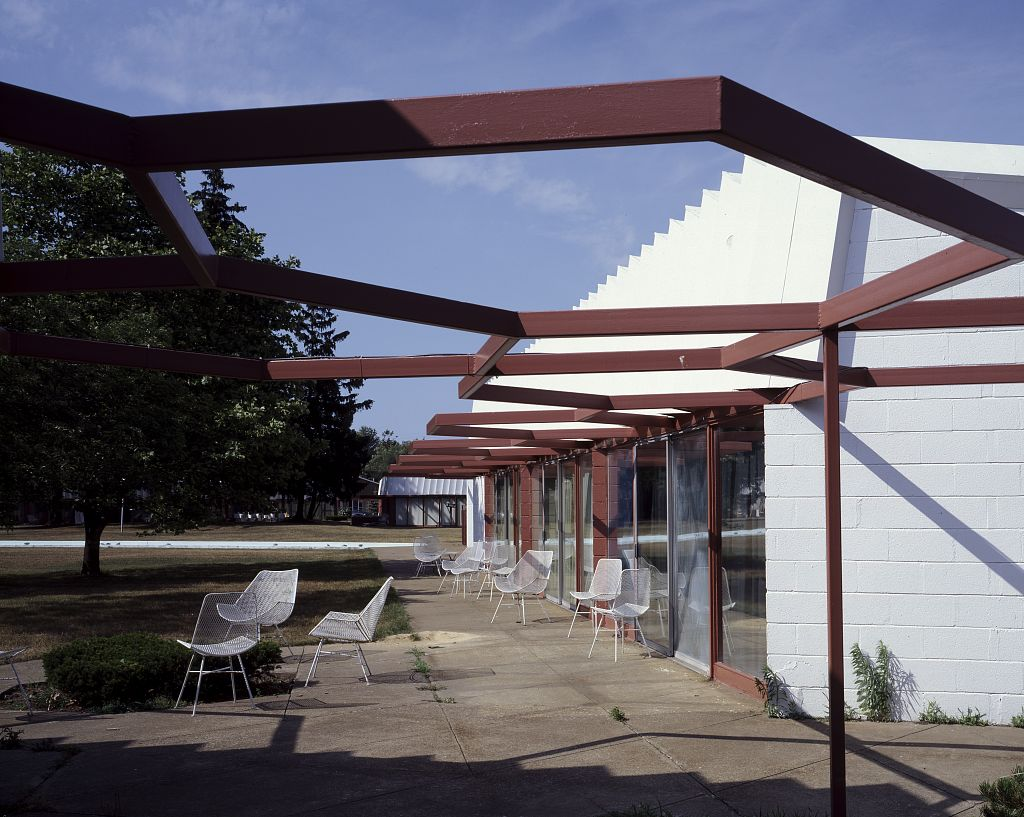

- Location within Michigan Location within the United States
- Interactive map
- Location: 3822 Red Arrow Hwy., Lincoln Township, Michigan
- Coordinates: 42°2′55″N 86°30′56″W
- Area: 6.4 acres (2.6 ha)
- Built: 1961
- Architect: William Wesley Peters
- Architectural style: Wrightian
- Demolished: 2006
- NRHP reference No.: 98000270

Significant dates
- Added to NRHP: April 13, 1998
- Removed from NRHP: May 26, 2021

The Snow Flake Motel was a motel located at 3822 Red Arrow Highway in Lincoln Township, Michigan. It was added to the National Register of Historic Places in 1998, but demolished in 2006 and removed from the Register in 2021.

== History ==
In approximately 1958, Sahag Sarkisian approached Taliesin Associated Architects, a design firm headed by Frank Lloyd Wright, about designing a luxury motel at this location. One of Sarkisian's personal friends had recently moved into a house designed by Wright, and Sarkisian had decided to consult with Wright about the project. Although it is reported that Wright himself had some involvement in the initial plans for the motel, it is not clear to what extent, and the final contract between Sarkisian and Taliesin was signed in June 1960, after Wright's death. Wright's son-in-law and protege, William Wesley Peters, completed the plans for the hotel and delivered them in August of that year.

Construction on the motel began in 1961, and it opened in 1962. The motel, with its luxury amenities, was initially highly successful. However, Sarkisian was inexperienced in the hospitality business, and a series of personal tragedies caused him to lose interest in the property. The motel declined during the 1970s, and in 1979 Sarkisian sold it to William and Carlene Lymburner. They rehabilitated the hotel, selling it in 1986. The motel went through a number of subsequent owners, and by 1996 had morphed into the St. Joseph Inn which was intended to serve long-term residents. The motel was demolished on March 27, 2006.

In 2025 township trustees approved a planned unit development to be built on the site.

== Description ==
The Snow Flake Motel was a concrete block structure with a deeply corrugated metal roof, constructed in six V-shaped sections arranged like a six-pointed star around a central courtyard. The sections were connected with an open canopy trellis made of metal tubing arranged in a hexagonal pattern. Underneath the trellis was a paved surface that visually united the buildings. The motel contained 57 rooms, all facing the inner courtyard, with sliding glass doors opening onto patio spaces. Parking was along the outer perimeter. Each trapezoidal room had a small foyer entered from the outer perimeter, with a bath alongside. Beyond the foyer, the unit opened out into the bedroom, with a large open glass area facing the interior courtyard.

The central courtyard contained an axial series of pools, the swimming pool being at one end within one of the motel sections. The office extended outward from the same section (effectively turning it into a "Y" section rather than a "V" section). This section contained a lobby, manager's quarters, and a guest lounge, as well as a coffee shop, cocktail lounge, and banquet room.
