= Ruth Eckerd Hall =

Performing arts hall in Clearwater, Florida

Coordinates: 27.976033°N 82.704853°W

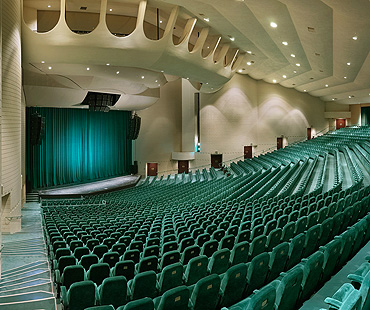
- Interior of venue (c.2006)
- Address: 1111 McMullen Booth Rd; Clearwater, FL 33759-3219
- Location: Clearwater
- Owner: Ruth Eckerd Hall, Inc.
- Capacity: 2,180
- Type: Performing arts center

Construction
- Opened: October 15, 1983
- Architect: Taliesin Associated Architects

Website
- www.rutheckerdhall.com

Ruth Eckerd Hall is a 73,000-square-foot (6,800 m^{2}) performing arts venue, located in Clearwater, Florida, in the Tampa Bay area and is part of the Richard B. Baumgardner Center for the Performing Arts.

The concert hall is named after Ruth Eckerd, the wife of businessman Jack Eckerd, and is a regular performance venue for the Florida Orchestra.

Its 2,180-seat auditorium features continental seating, with no center aisle.

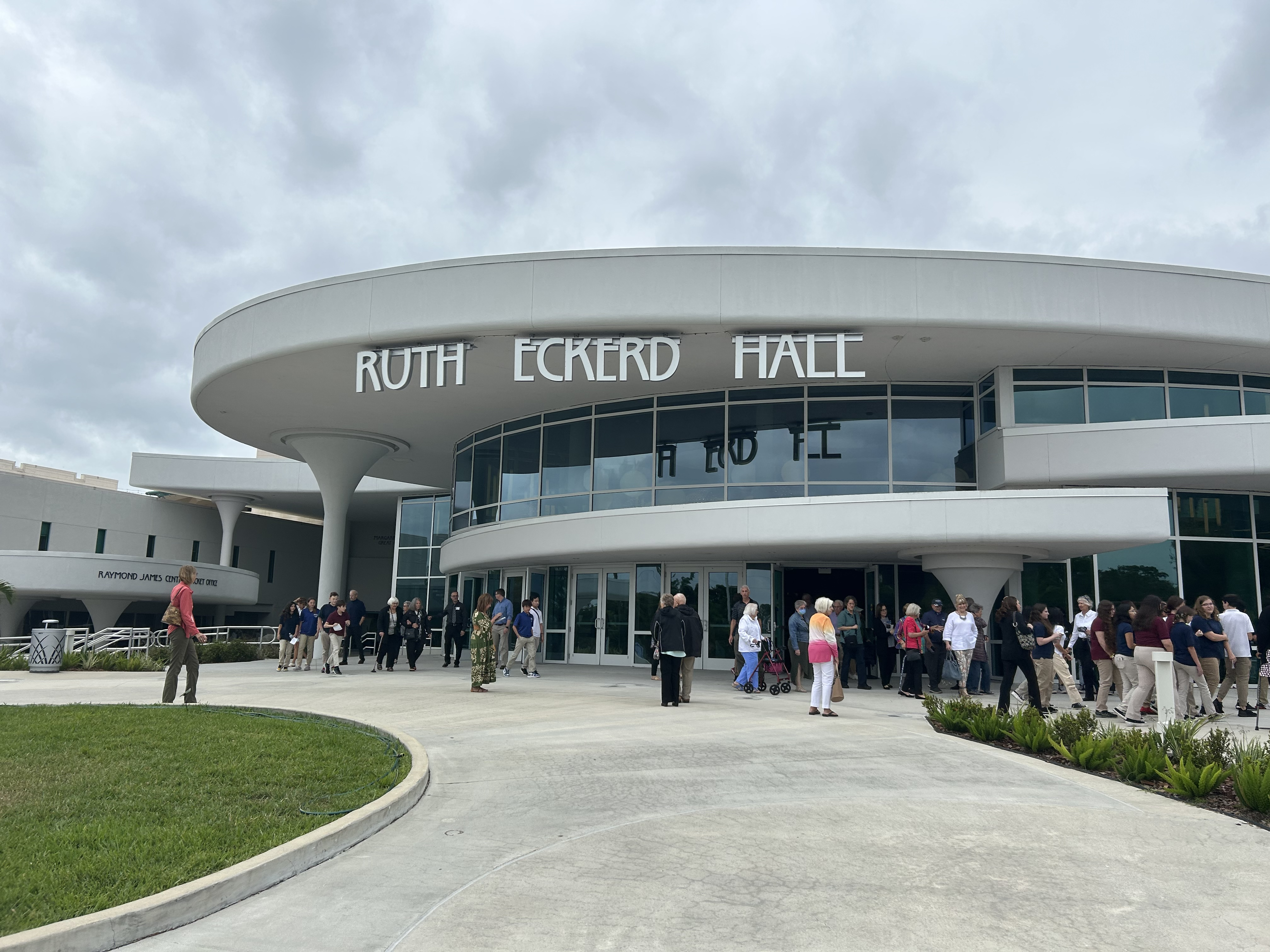
The outside of the venue, April 2023

== History ==
In 1977, the Kapok Tree Corporation donated 38 acres (150,000 m^{2}) to the City of Clearwater, stipulating that a performing arts center be built on the property. The bequest mandated that the construction begin within two years, and in 1979 a groundbreaking ceremony was held. At its inception, a group of dedicated volunteers in the community stepped forward to organize the effort and obtain the necessary resources for its completion. Among these leaders, Jack and Ruth Eckerd were instrumental in the project's success. The main auditorium is named in Mrs. Eckerd's honor. The center's main name recognizes Richard B. Baumgardner, the founder of the Kapok Tree Corporation. The facility is a Frank Lloyd Wright inspired building with Taliesin Associated Architects, led by William Wesley Peters doing the design work. Construction costs $14.5 million, with $9 million donated by the private sector and the remaining $5.5 million provided through a mortgage. The Hall was dedicated and opened on October 15, 1983.

Created to own, manage and maintain the land and the facility, Ruth Eckerd Hall, Inc. is a non-profit presenting organization, while the Ruth Eckerd Hall Foundation, Inc. obtains funding for debt retirement and the ongoing operation of the center.

Each year, over 350,000 adult and young audience members visit Ruth Eckerd Hall for performances by world-renowned classical artists and dance companies, Broadway musicals, and pop stars. Through its many arts education programs, the education department of Ruth Eckerd Hall serves nearly 100,000 students and adults annually.

The Board of Directors of both organizations and the management staff are committed to continuing to present the finest performing arts and provide educational opportunities in the performing arts to all segments of the community.

== See also ==
- Jack Eckerd
