= San Jose Center for the Performing Arts =

Theatre in San Jose, California, United States

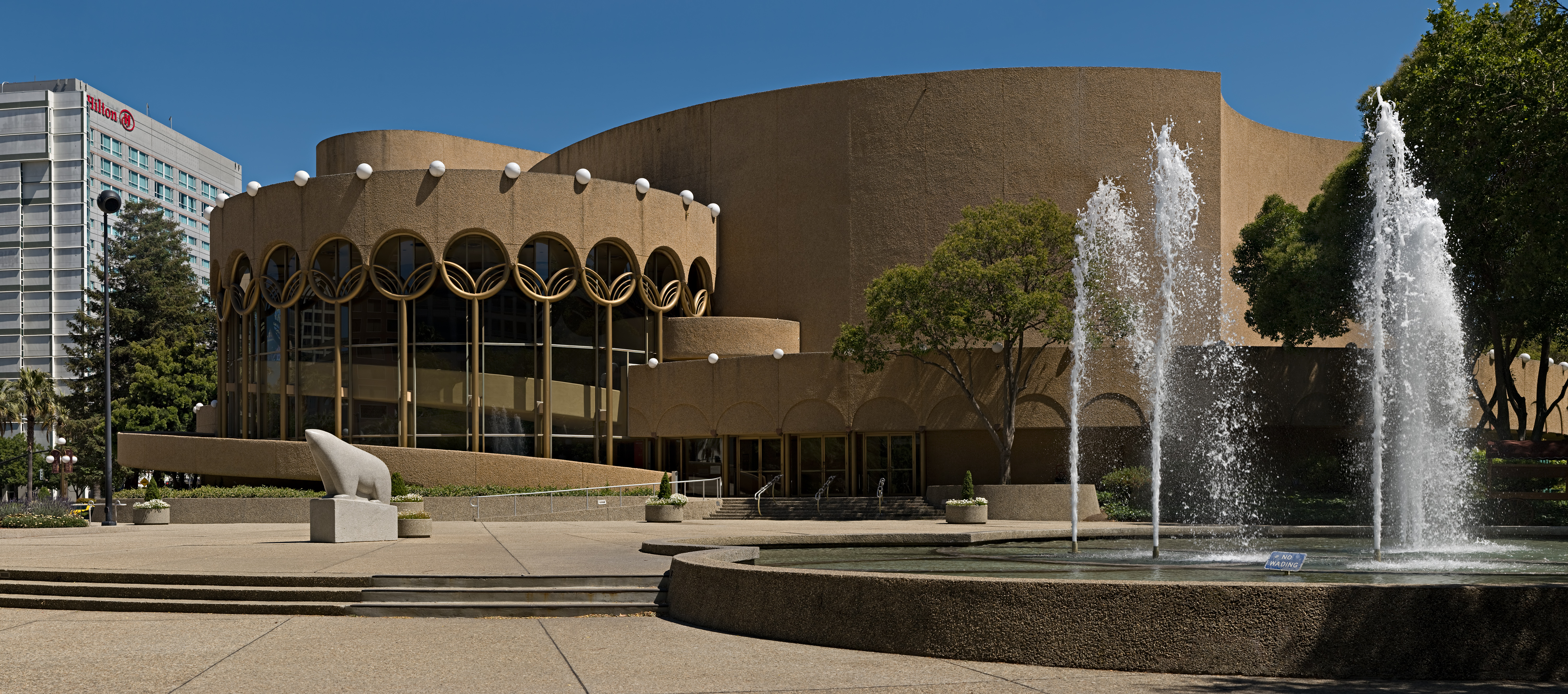
- Interactive map of San Jose Center for the Performing Arts
- Address: 255 Almaden Blvd. San Jose, California; United States
- Coordinates: 37°19′47.92″N 121°53′31.75″W
- Owner: City of San Jose
- Operator: Team San Jose
- Capacity: 2,677
- Type: Performing arts center
- Public transit: Convention Center

Construction
- Opened: 1972
- Architect: Taliesin Associated Architects
- Builder: Barnhart Construction Company

Tenants
- San Jose Dance Theatre; Broadway San Jose

Website
- sanjosetheaters.org

The San Jose Center for the Performing Arts is a performing arts venue located in Downtown San Jose, California, United States. It opened in 1972 and is now home to San Jose Dance Theatre and Broadway San Jose.

== History ==
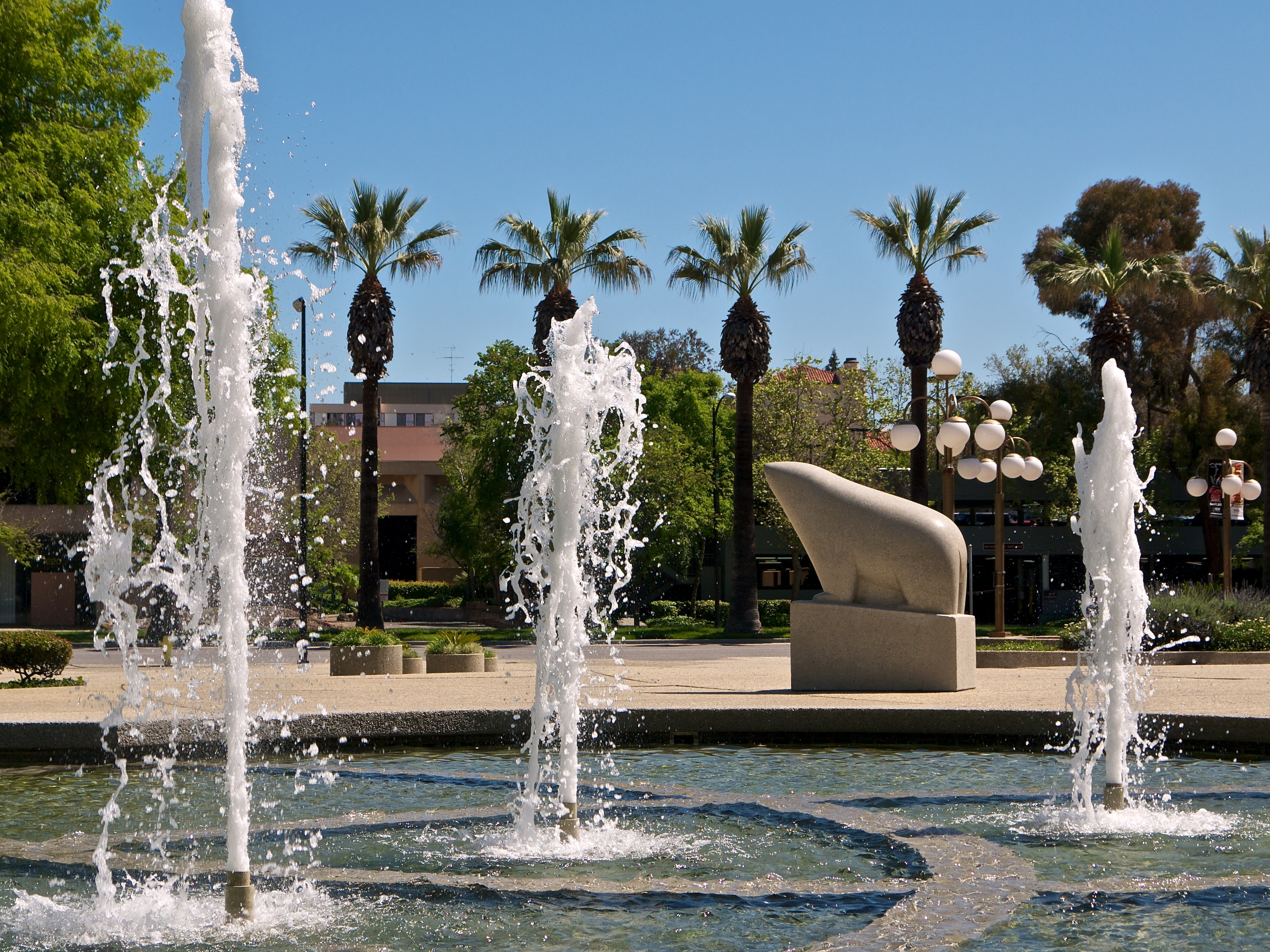
Performing Arts Plaza

The theater opened in 1972. The architect was William Wesley Peters of Taliesin Associated Architects and the contractor was the Barnhart Construction Company. Less than three months after the theater opened, a portion of the movable auditorium ceiling collapsed, resulting in two workmen being stranded on a steel beam above. The 15-ton ceiling crushed 100 seats. However, nobody was injured and the two workmen were able to make it to safety. The theater was closed for repairs for several months and reopened in 1973. For 34 years, the theater was the home of the American Musical Theatre of San Jose (a.k.a. San Jose Civic Light Opera) from 1975 until the demise of the theater company in 2008.

== Architecture ==
The center's auditorium has 2,677 seats, split into 1,921 orchestra and 756 balcony seats. It also has two smaller rooms, the Private Ridder Lounge with capacity for 150 and the Private President's Club with capacity for 50.

== Notable events ==
- FanFan – Road To Happiness World Tour – January 28, 2018
- Joker Xue – Skyscraper World Tour – November 9, 2018
- Paris by Night – Shows 67, 71, 75 & 79 – 2000-2005

== See also ==
- List of tourist attractions in Silicon Valley
