= Van Wezel Performing Arts Hall =

Performing arts venue in Sarasota, Florida

Ven Wezel Performing Arts Hall
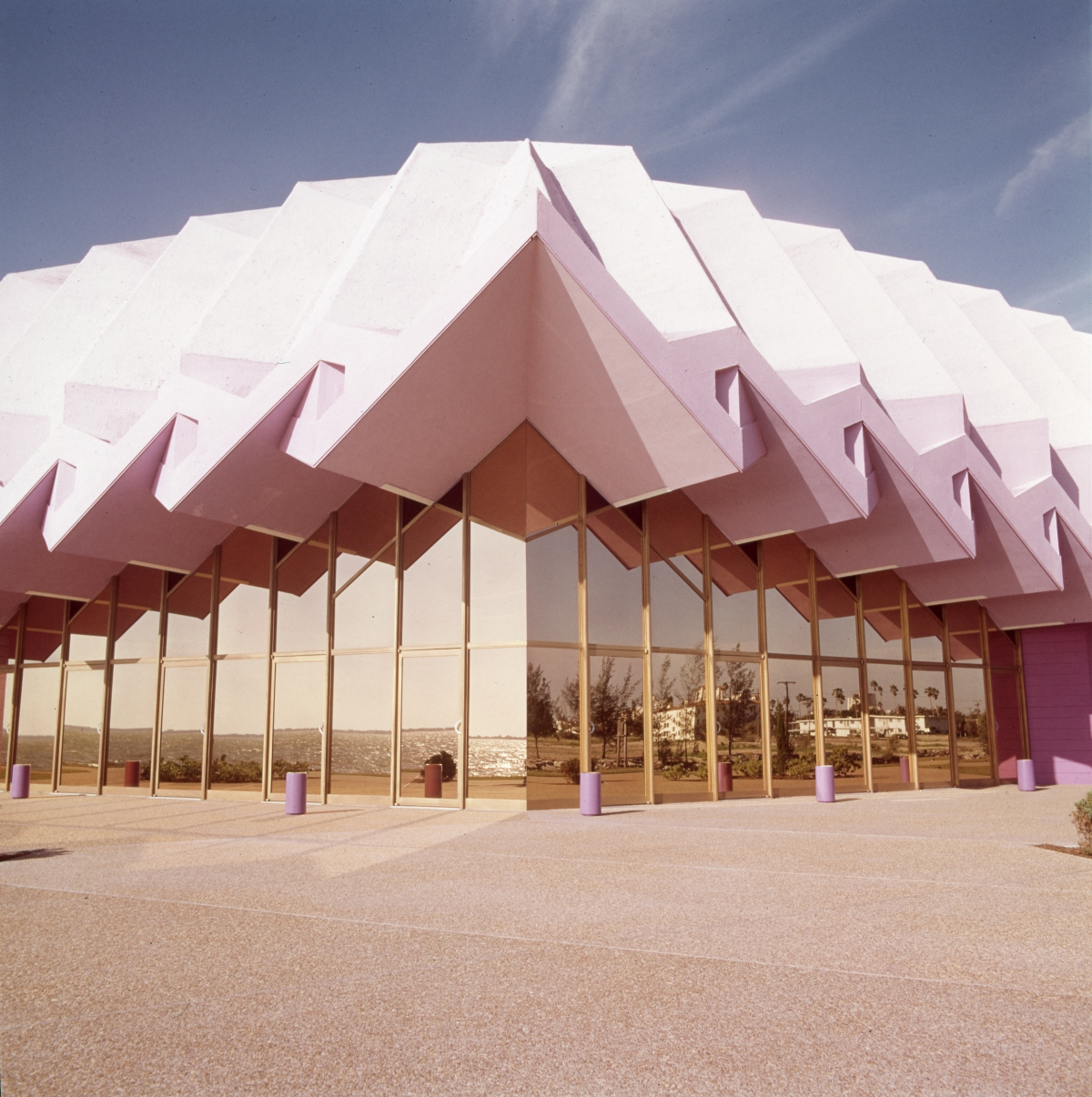
- Close-up view of the Van Wezel Performing Arts Hall
- Interactive map of Ven Wezel Performing Arts Hall
- Address: 777 N Tamiami Trail
- Location: Sarasota, Florida
- Coordinates: 27.3448°N 82.5493°W
- Owner: Sarasota
- Operator: Sarasota
- Capacity: 1,741
- Type: Performing arts center
- Acreage: 80,000 ft^{2} (7,400 m^{2})

Construction
- Groundbreaking: April 25, 1968
- Opened: January 5, 1970
- Architect: William Wesley Peters
- General contractor: Henry C. Beck Company

Website
- vanwezel.org

The Van Wezel Performing Arts Hall is a performing arts venue located at 777 North Tamiami Trail, Sarasota, Florida neighboring the Sarasota Bay. The main theater of the 80,000 square feet (7,400 m^{2}) facility contains 1,741 seats.

== History ==
The initial construction of the 1,736-seat hall was partly funded by a bequest from local residents Lewis and Eugenia van Wezel, who donated $400,000 of the total construction cost of $2.5 million.

The architectural design was carried out by William Wesley Peters, of Taliesin Associated Architects, who used seashells as inspiration for the design.

The purple and lavender color scheme was suggested by Frank Lloyd Wright's widow, Olgivanna Lloyd Wright.

The Henry C. Beck Company was general contractor for construction of the hall.

In 2023, the Van Wezel Performing Arts Hall was listed on the Florida Trust for Historic Preservation's 11 to Save, citing "time and environmental threats," including the plans to build a new performing arts center.

== Foundation controversy ==
The Van Wezel Foundation was formed in 1987 to support the operations of the performing hall. Then in 2019, the foundation changed its name to the Sarasota Performing Arts Center Foundation, Inc. In addition to supporting the arts education initiatives, the foundation is also raising funds to construct a new performing arts center.

While continuing to operate under its old "Van Wezel" name, the new foundation actively promoted the new hall while denigrating the still functioning hall. This campaign was considered deceptive by the namesake Van Wezel family resulting in a cease and desist request.
