= Beaver Meadows Visitor Center =

- Rocky Mountain National Park Administration Building
- U.S. National Register of Historic Places
- U.S. National Historic Landmark
- U.S. Historic district – Contributing property
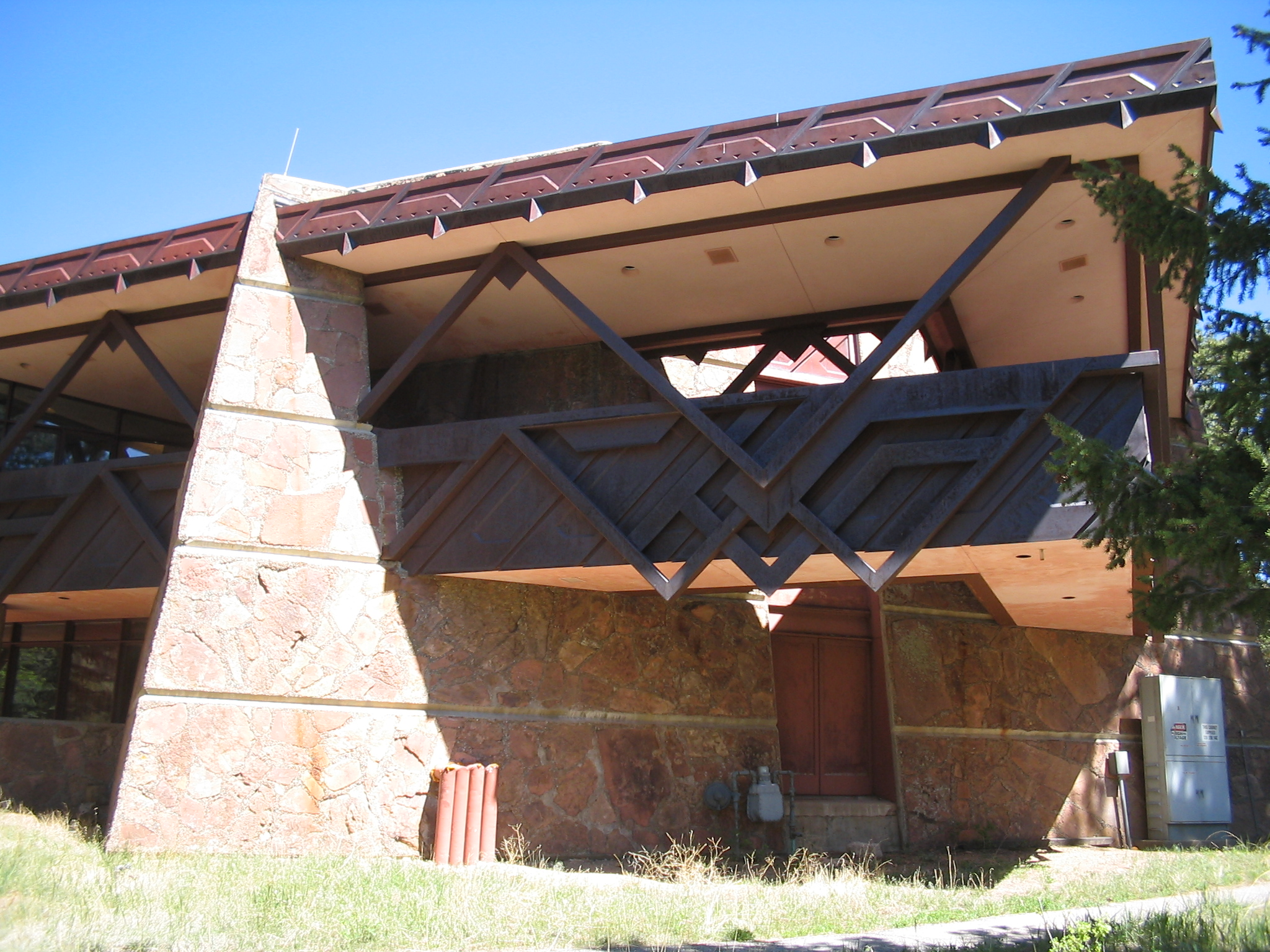

- Location within Colorado Location within the United States
- Location: Rocky Mountain National Park, Estes Park, Colorado
- Coordinates: 40°21′58″N 105°33′39″W
- Area: less than one acre
- Architect: Taliesin Associated Architects
- Architectural style: Park Service Modern
- Part of: Rocky Mountain National Park Utility Area Historic District (ID82001717)
- MPS: Rocky Mountain National Park MRA
- NRHP reference No.: 01000069

Significant dates
- Added to NRHP: January 3, 2001
- Designated NHL: January 3, 2001
- Designated CP: March 18, 1982

Beaver Meadows Visitor Center, also known as Rocky Mountain National Park Administration Building, is the park headquarters and principal visitors center of Rocky Mountain National Park in central northern Colorado. Completed in 1967, it was designed by Taliesin Associated Architects, and was one of the most significant commissions for that firm in the years immediately following the death of founder Frank Lloyd Wright. It was also one of the last major projects completed under the Park Service Mission 66 project. It was declared a National Historic Landmark in 2001.

== Description and history ==
The Beaver Meadows Visitor Center is located on the south side of United States Route 36 near the principal eastern entrance to Rocky Mountain National Park. As seen from visitor (north) side, the building presents as a single-story structure, but is actually two stories owing to the sloping terrain on which it is built. It is a rectangular structure, built with a steel frame and cast concrete panels, into which slabs of sandstone have been embedded. The upper level framing has Cor-Ten steel set in a zigzag pattern inspired by Native American artworks. The building's eastern end is devoted to visitor facilities, including a lobby, amphitheater, and shop, with an inside observation area and outside balcony providing views of the Rocky Mountains. The western end houses park offices in a modular design with movable partitions.

Rocky Mountain National Park was founded in 1915. As part of the Park Service's Mission 66 program to revitalize the nation's park system, the Park Service hired the firm of Taliesin Associated Architects in 1964 to design a new visitors center for the park. Construction began in 1965 and was completed in 1967. The building has been relatively little altered since then: the shop occupies a former lobby area that included benches and a fireplace, and changes in equipment for the theater necessitated the closure of a balcony entrance. A Snogo Snow Plow is on display at the center.

== Map ==
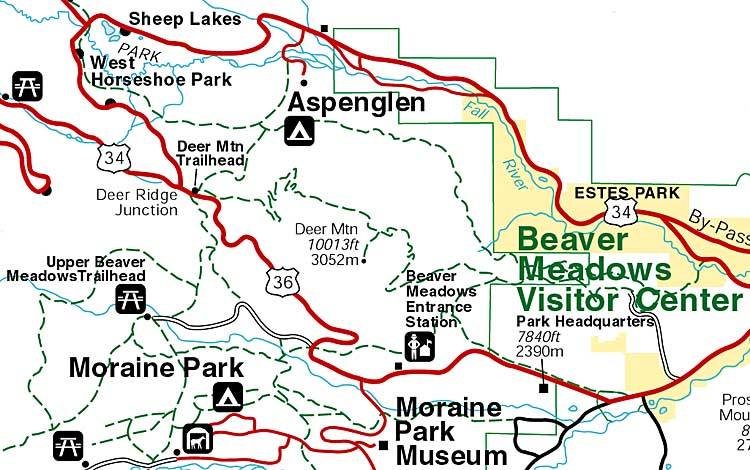
Beaver Meadows map

== See also ==
- Rocky Mountain National Park Utility Area Historic District
- National Register of Historic Places listings in Larimer County, Colorado
- List of National Historic Landmarks in Colorado
