= Taliesin Associated Architects =

Firm founded by Frank Lloyd Wright apprentices

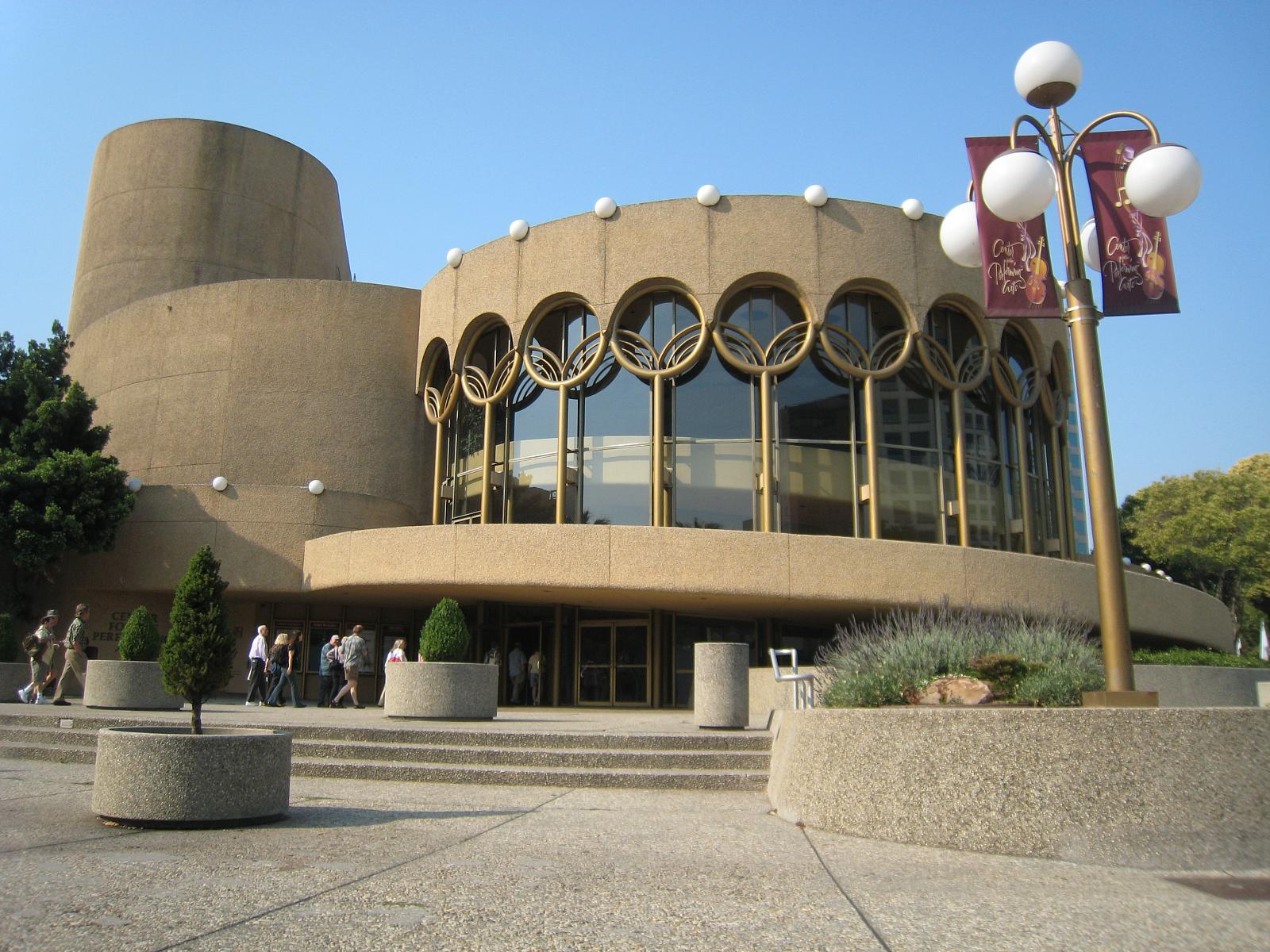
- San Jose Center for the Performing Arts, architect William Wesley Peters, 1972

Practice information
- Founded: 1959
- Dissolved: 2003
- Location: Taliesin West, Scottsdale, Arizona

Taliesin Associated Architects was an architectural firm founded by apprentices of Frank Lloyd Wright to carry on his architectural vision after his death in 1959. The firm disbanded in 2003.

It was headquartered at Taliesin West in Scottsdale, Arizona and had up to 14 principals who had all worked under Wright. One of their first major projects was the Rocky Mountain National Park Administration Building, part of Mission 66 for the National Park Service. Along with original work such as the Wright Tower (originally "Lincoln Tower", Louisville, Kentucky, 1966), the firm completed several of Wright's unbuilt designs, and performed renovation and expansion, for instance at the Arizona Biltmore Hotel in Phoenix.

The first managing principal was Wright's protégé and son-in-law William Wesley Peters, until his death in 1991. Other TAA architects included Charles Montooth, John Rattenbury and Vernon Swaback.

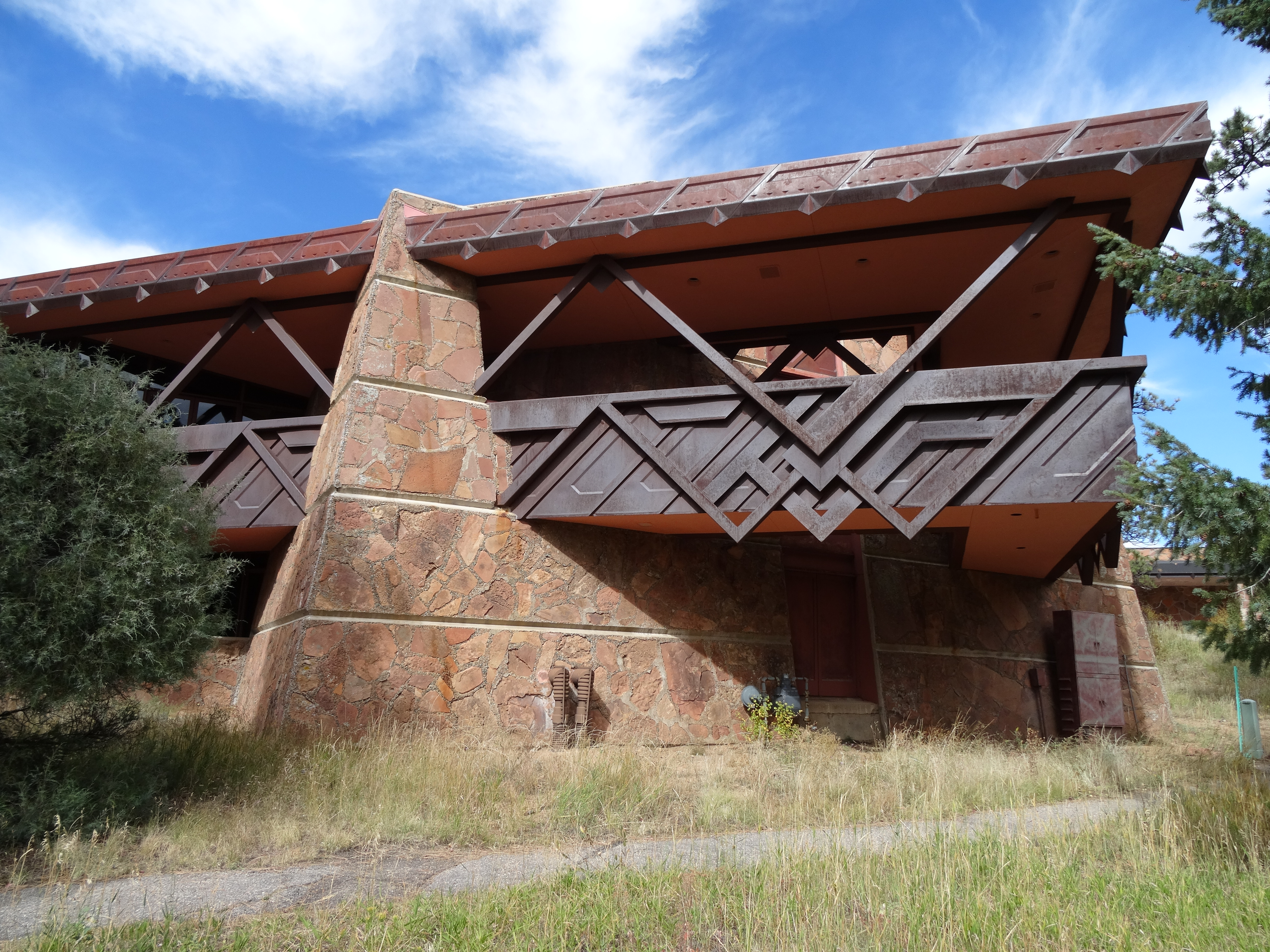
Beaver Meadows Visitors Center, 1965–67

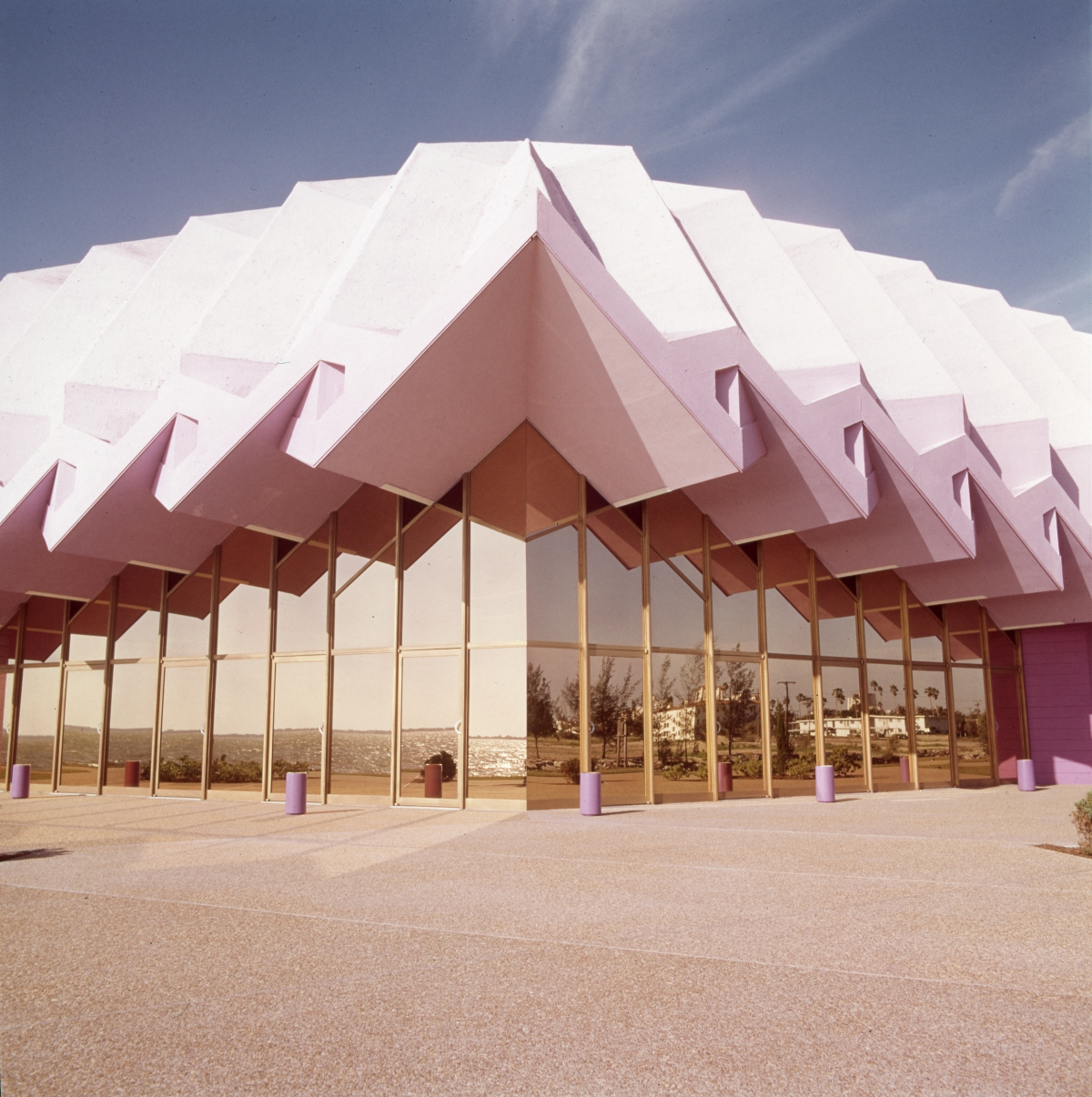
Van Wezel Performing Arts Hall, architect William Wesley Peters, 1968–70

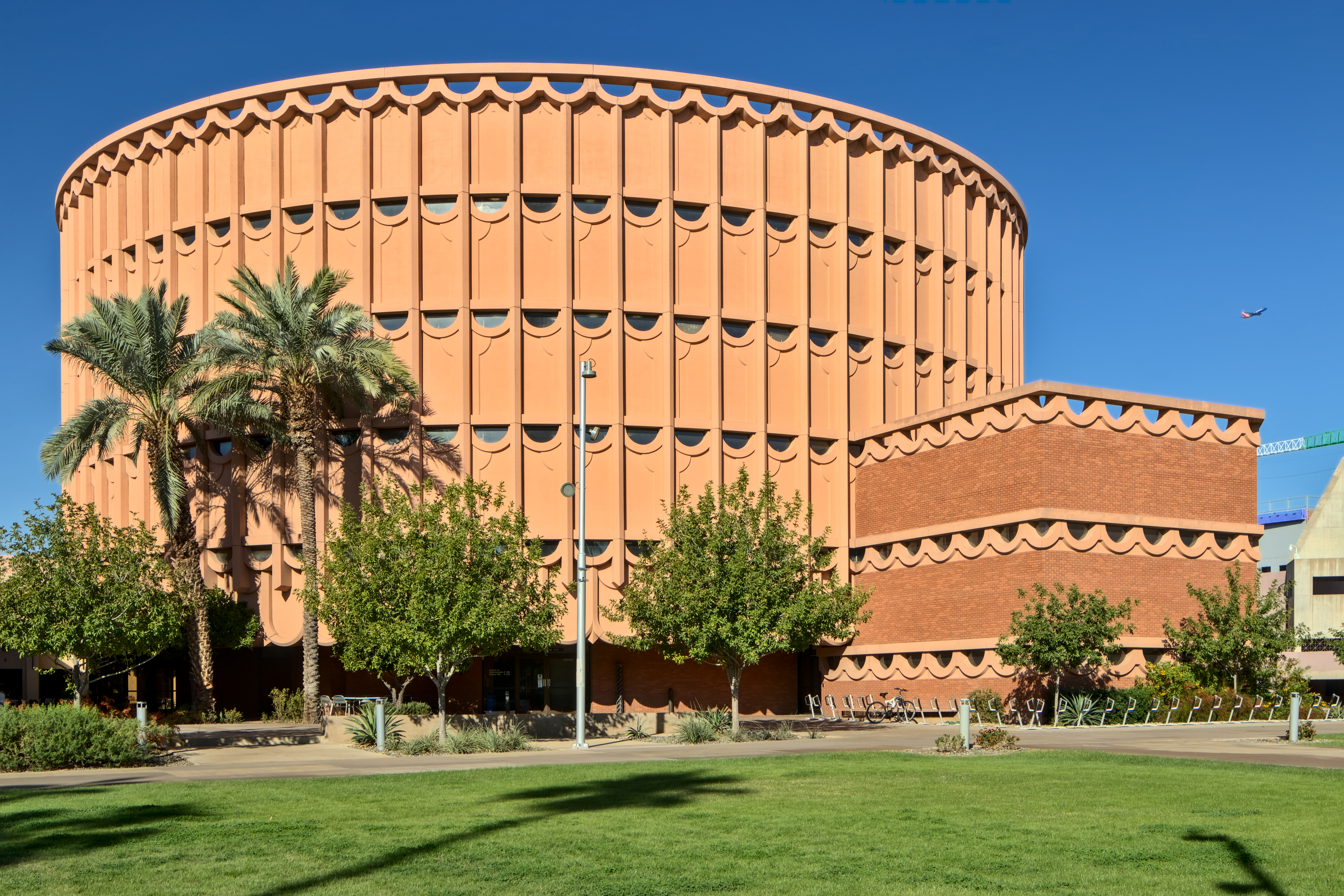
Arizona State University Music Building, architect William Wesley Peters, 1970

== Selected works ==
Taliesin Associated Architects Works
Name	Year(s)	Location	Address	Project Architect	Notes
Snow Flake Motel	1960–61	Lincoln Township, Michigan	3822 Red Arrow Highway	William Wesley Peters	Demolished 2006
Phi Delta Theta Fraternity House	1960–61	Arizona State University, Tempe, Arizona	E Alpha Drive	William Wesley Peters	Demolished 2011
Ascension Lutheran Church	1962	Paradise Valley, Arizona	7100 N Mockingbird Lane	William Wesley Peters	Demolished 2024
Golden Rondelle Theater	1964	Racine, Wisconsin	1525 Howe Street		Originally built for the New York Worlds Fair
Wright Tower	1965–66	Louisville, Kentucky	6100 Dutchmans Lane	William Wesley Peters	Originally known as Lincoln Tower
Beaver Meadows Visitor Center	1965–67	Estes Park, Colorado	Rocky Mountain National Park	Tom Casey	
Van Wezel Performing Arts Hall	1968–70	Sarasota, Florida	777 N Tamiami Trail	William Wesley Peters	
St. Mary Catholic Church	1969	Alma, Michigan	510 Prospect Ave.	William Wesley Peters	
ASU Music Building	1970	Arizona State University, Tempe, Arizona	50 E Gammage Pkwy.	William Wesley Peters	
Veterans' Memorial Auditorium	1971	San Rafael, California	10 Ave of the Flags	William Wesley Peters, George Izenour, Aaron Green.	Part of the Marin County Civic Center designed by Frank Lloyd Wright.
San Jose Center for the Performing Arts	1972	San Jose, California	255 Almaden Blvd.	William Wesley Peters	
Bank of Spring Green	1972	Spring Green, Wisconsin	209 E Jefferson Street	William Wesley Peters	now BMO Harris Bank
BSP Insurance Building	1972	Scottsdale, Arizona	6200 E Oak Street	Stephan Nemtin	
Pearl Palace	Circa 1972	Karaj, Alborz province, Iran	QVQP+4H6 Mehrshahr	William Wesley Peters	
Arizona Biltmore Hotel Renovation	1973	Phoenix, Arizona	2400 E Missouri Ave.	William Wesley Peters, John Rattenbury	Renovations after a 6-Alarm fire destroyed parts of the hotel.
Our Lady of Fatima Catholic Church	1975	Tucson, Arizona	1950 Irvington Place	William Wesley Peters	
Arizona Biltmore Hotel Paradise Wing	1975–76	Phoenix, Arizona	2400 E Missouri Ave.	John Rattenbury	
Damavand College	1976	Tehran, Iran	Lashgark Road	William Wesley Peters	now Payame Noor University
Mountain View Estates	1976–77	Paradise Valley, Arizona	N Tatum Blvd. and E Onyx Road	Vernon Swaback, John Rattenbury, Anthony Puttnam	Subdivision of 56 single-family homes.
Mesa Convention Center	1977–78	Mesa, Arizona	201 N Center Street	John Rattenbury, Anthony Puttnam	
Mountain View East	1978	McCormic Ranch, Scottsdale, Arizona	N Hayden Road and E Del Timbre Drive	Vernon Swaback, John Rattenbury	Subdivision of 51 single-family homes.
Arizona Biltmore Hotel Valley Wing	1979	Phoenix, Arizona	2400 E Missouri Ave.		
Ahwatukee House of the Future	1979	Phoenix, Arizona	3713 E Equestrian Trail	Charles R. Schiffner	
Bartlesville Community Center	1982	Bartlesville, Oklahoma	300 SE Adams Blvd.	William Wesley Peters	
Arizona Biltmore Hotel Terrace Court Wing	1982	Phoenix, Arizona	2400 E Missouri Ave		
Ruth Eckerd Hall	1983	Clearwater, Florida	1111 McMullen Booth Road	William Wesley Peters	
Arizona Conference of Seventh-day Adventists	1983	Scottsdale, Arizona	13405 N Scottsdale Road	Charles R. Schiffner	
Marin County Civic Center	1960–1962, 1966–1969	San Rafael, California	3501 Civic Center Drive	William Wesley Peters, Aaron Green	Designed by Wright 1957–59 with an administration building and post office (built 1960–62) and Hall of Justice (built 1966–69).
Grady Gammage Memorial Auditorium	1962–64	Arizona State University, Tempe, Arizona	1200 S Forest Ave.	William Wesley Peters	Originally designed by Wright as an opera house for the King of Baghdad, Wright revised the design as an auditorium for ASU with construction overseen by Peters.
Norman Lykes House	1968	Phoenix, Arizona	6836 N 38th Street	John Rattenbury	Wright's last residential design.
First Christian Church	1973	Phoenix, Arizona	6750 N 7th Ave.	William Wesley Peters	Originally designed by Wright for the Southwest Christian Seminary in 1950. The plans would not be used until 1971. Permission was given by Wright's widow to use the plans, with construction overseen by Peters.
King Kamehameha Golf Course Clubhouse	1993	Waikapu, Maui, Hawaii	2500 HI-30	John Rattenbury	Originally designed as the unbuilt Arthur Miller House (1957), which was a revision of two older unbuilt projects the Baillères House (1952) and the Windfohr House (1949). Rattenbury combined all three designs to design the clubhouse.
Monona Terrace Community & Convention Center	1997	Madison, Wisconsin	1 John Nolen Drive	Anthony Puttnam	First proposed by Wright in 1938 the design was rejected. Wright would continue to revise the design until his death. Anthony Puttnam would complete the final design revisions.
Frank Lloyd Wright Spire	2003–04	Scottsdale, Arizona	7207 E Frank Lloyd Wright Blvd.		Part of the unbuilt Arizona State Capital Design proposed by Wright. Design adapted by TAA.
