= Danny Newman =

Danny Newman (January 24, 1919 – December 1, 2007) was the long-time press agent for the Lyric Opera of Chicago from its founding in 1954 until his retirement in 2002. Newman was known for increasing the use of subscription programs to build audiences for performing arts.

Newman is the author of the 1977 book Subscribe Now!, which was published by the Theatre Communications Group. The book outlines Newman's unwavering advocacy for subscription-based ticket sales. The book is currently in its eleventh printing.

He died on December 1, 2007, of pulmonary fibrosis. Newman was 88 years old.
