= Don M Stromquist House =

House in Bountiful, Utah

Don M. Stromquist House
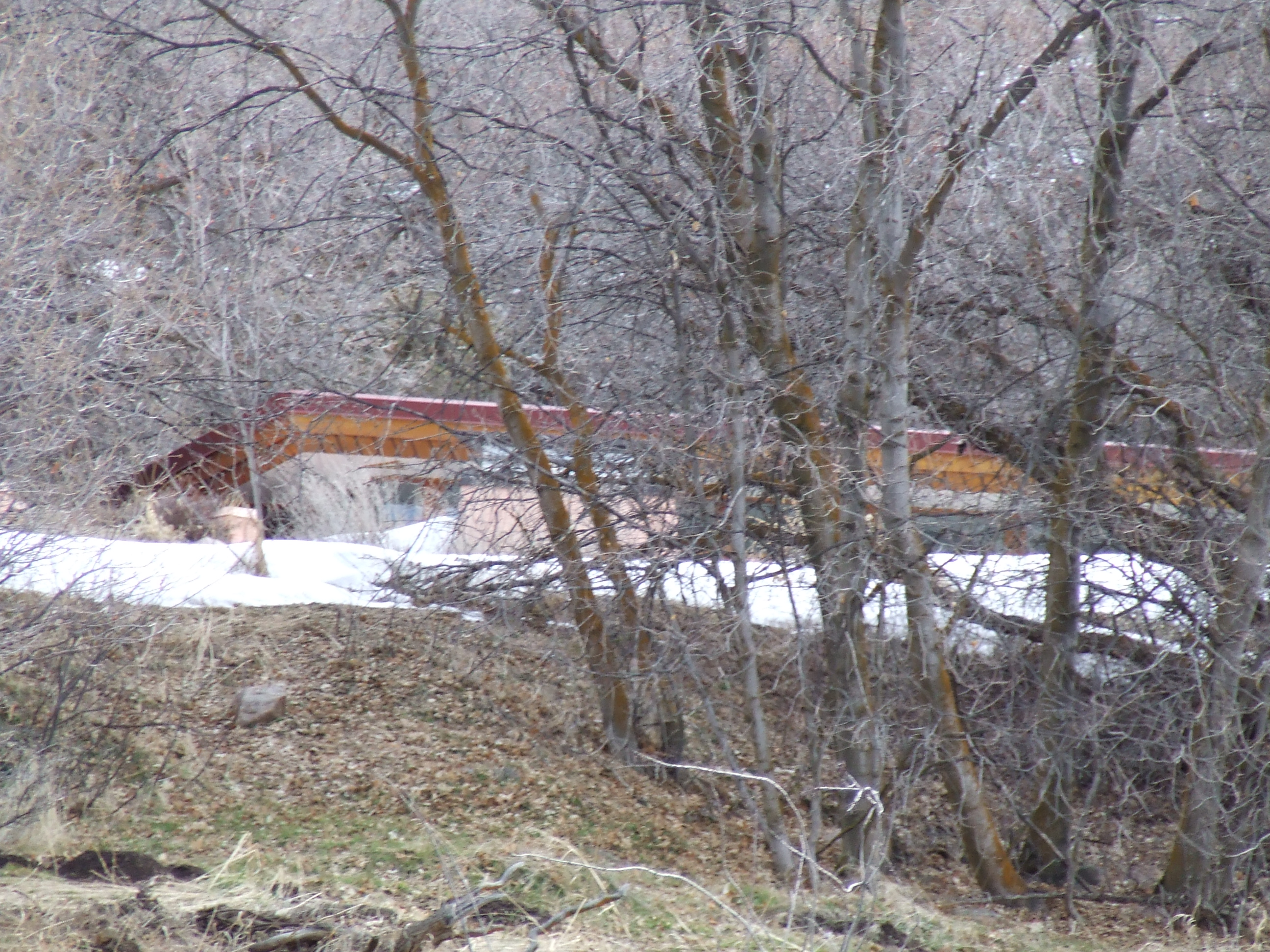

- Location within Utah

General information
- Type: House
- Architectural style: Usonian
- Location: Bountiful, Utah
- Coordinates: 40°50′53″N 111°51′23″W
- Construction started: 1959

Technical details
- Floor area: 2,700 sq ft (250 m^{2})

Design and construction
- Architect: Frank Lloyd Wright

The Don M. Stromquist House, designed by Frank Lloyd Wright, is located on a ten-acre site in Bountiful, Utah. At an altitude of 6,000 feet (1,800 m), it consists of the main house, an office/laboratory/garage annex, a gardener's shed and a barn. It is sited halfway down an arroyo or canyon wall. The house has an endless view of the Great Salt Lake and Antelope Island.

== Architect ==
Frank Lloyd Wright designed the house on a grid of 60 and 120-degree angles, which formed a series of parallelograms. The grid lines are embedded in the concrete floors, and the ceiling features small strips of wood that reflect the same grid lines. The house is constructed using salmon-colored concrete blocks, steel beams, glass, and Philippine mahogany.

In addition to the architectural elements, Wright also created plans for the furniture, creating a cohesive look throughout the house. The dining room table, for example, mirrors the grid pattern on the floor. The house also includes built-in settees, lamp tables, and bookshelves, all designed by Wright. Some freestanding furniture pieces, such as a coffee table and hassocks, were also part of Wright's design. Even the fireplace tools, featuring half-diamond shapes on the handles, were thoughtfully designed by the architect.

== Main structure ==
The main house features three small bedrooms, two granite-clad (an addition Stromquist made after he repurchased the home) bathrooms, a kitchen, semi-formal dining, laundry, utility room, two fireplaces, and two balconies. Clerestory windows provide natural lighting. The master bedroom has its own fireplace and French doors that lead to a secluded balcony. Heating is provided by a combined radiant and forced-air system that utilizes two natural gas furnaces, which was designed by William Wesley "Wes" Peters, Wright's son-in-law and chief engineer.

As a boy, Don Stromquist had attended a speech by Frank Lloyd Wright, and was impressed. When it was time for him to build a home, he asked Wright to design it. Construction on the home began in 1959 and was completed in 1961 at a cost of about $32,000, when Stromquist and his wife, Jane, were newlyweds. Wright died in 1959, before the house was completed. After living in the home for several years, the home was purchased by Mr. Stromquist's employer, U.S. Steel, when Mr. Stromquist's position was relocated to the company's headquarters in Pittsburgh, Pennsylvania. Thirty years later, the couple moved back to Utah to find that the house had been abandoned, vandalized, and eventually sold as horse property. George M. Frandsen and his partner, David A. Carlquist, both Utah natives, later bought the home and restored it to the details of the original architectural drawings. Taliesin Associated Architects John deKoven Hill and Cornelia Brierly oversaw the restoration. Breirly had been Wright's color and fabric consultant when the home was first designed. At the completion of the restoration she commented that the home was the best preserved example of Wright's Usonian architecture. During the ten years the home was owned by Frandsen and Carlquist, fundraising events were frequently held there to benefit local nonprofit organizations, including the couple's favorite, the American Civil Liberties Union (ACLU). The Stromquists were members of the ACLU and were invited to speak at a fundraising event held in the home and gardens. A friendship between the Stromquists and the men developed. Later, when the men decided to move from Utah, they sold the home to the Stromquists, who moved back into the house. Mrs. Stromquist died there a short time later. The home has been occupied by Don's son, George, since Don's death in 2009.

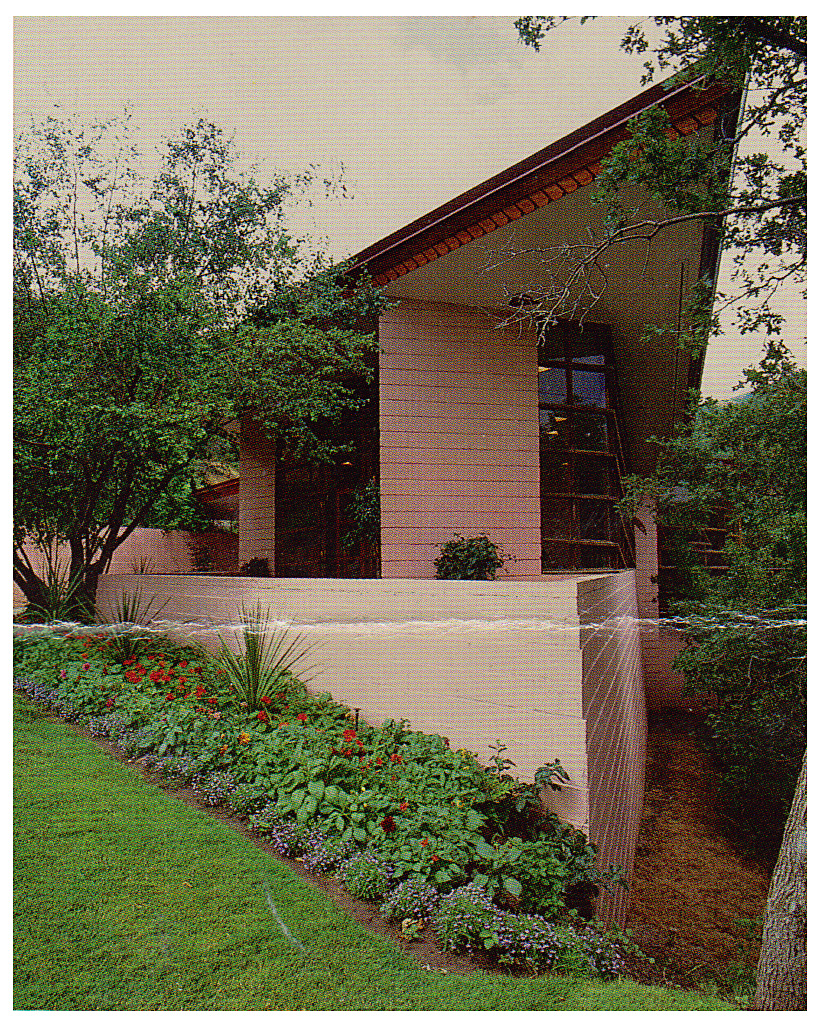
Photo from brochure – the Bountiful Davis Art Center Don M Stromquist House Architect Frank Lloyd Wright, completed 1961, Bountiful, Utah USA

== See also ==
- List of Frank Lloyd Wright works
