= Shams Pahlavi =

Iranian princess (1917–1996)

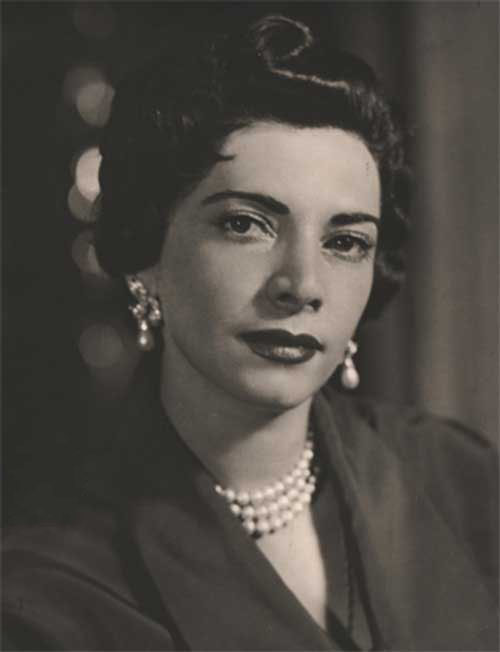
- Princess Shams in the 1940s
- Born: Khadijeh Pahlavi; 28 October 1917; Tehran, Sublime State of Iran
- Died: 29 February 1996 (aged 78); Santa Barbara, California, U.S.
- Spouse: Fereydoun Djam (m. 1937; div. 1944) Mehrdad Pahlbod (m. 1945)
- Issue: Shahbaz Pahlbod; Shahyar Pahlbod; Shahrazad Pahlbod
- House: Pahlavi
- Father: Reza Shah
- Mother: Tadj ol-Molouk

Shams Pahlavi (Persian: شمس پهلوی; 28 October 1917 – 29 February 1996) was an Iranian royal and the elder sister of Mohammad Reza Pahlavi, the last Shah of Iran. During her brother's reign, she was the president of the Red Lion and Sun Society. She left Iran for the United States after the 1979 Iranian Revolution.

== Biography ==
Princess Shams was born in Tehran on 28 October 1917. She was the elder daughter of Reza Shah and his consort Tadj ol-Molouk.

When the Second Eastern Women's Congress was arranged in Tehran in 1932, Shams Pahlavi served as its president and Sediqeh Dowlatabadi as its secretary.

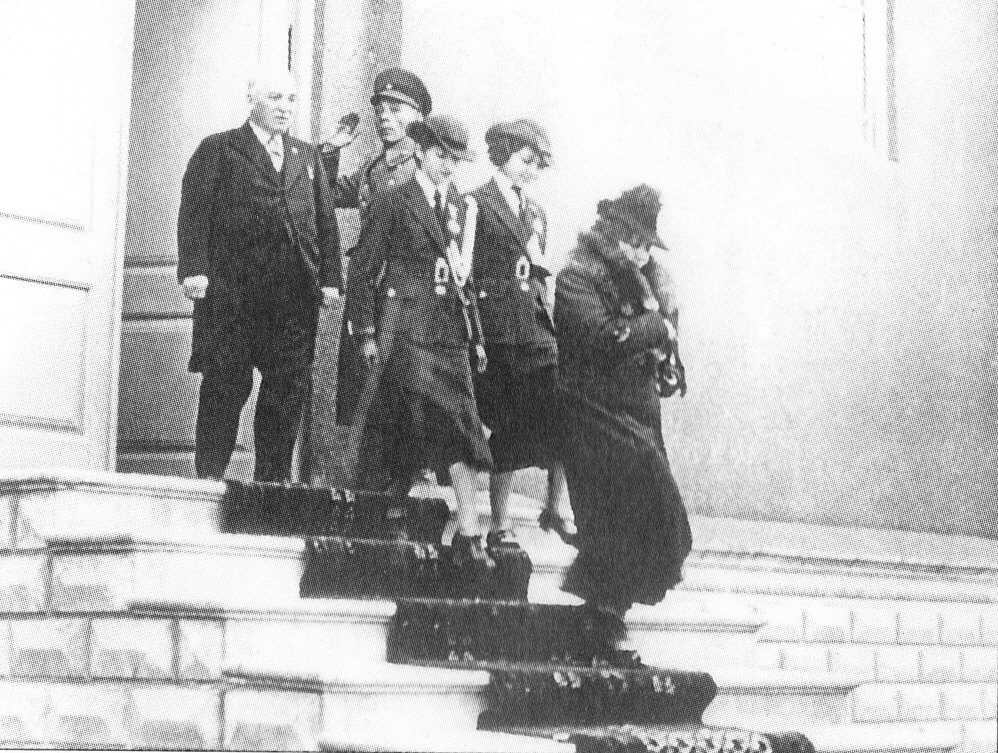
Shams, her mother, and her sister Ashraf leaving the palace the day that wearing the chador was officially prohibited in Iran (January 7, 1936).

On 8 January 1936, she and her mother and sister, Ashraf, played a major symbolic role in the Kashf-e hijab (the abolition of the veil) which was a part of the shah's effort to include women in public society, by participating in the graduation ceremony of the Tehran Teacher's College unveiled.

Shams Pahlavi married Fereydoun Djam, son of then-prime minister of Iran Mahmoud Djam, under strict orders from her father in 1937, but the marriage was unhappy, and the couple divorced immediately after the death of Reza Shah.

Following the deposition of Reza Shah after the Anglo-Soviet invasion of Iran in 1941, Shams and her husband accompanied her father during his exile to Port Louis, Mauritius, and later Johannesburg, South Africa. She published her memoir of this trip in monthly installments in the Ettela'at newspaper in 1948.

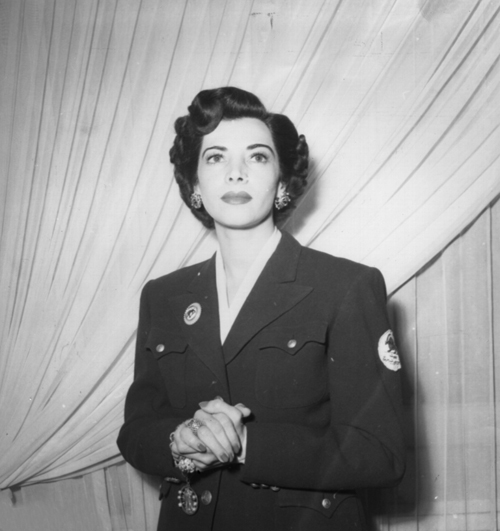
Princess Shams, 1950

Shams was deprived of her ranks and titles for a brief period of time after her second marriage to Mehrdad Pahlbod, and lived in the United States from 1945 to 1947. Later, a reconciliation with the court was achieved and the couple returned to Tehran only to leave again during the upheavals of the Abadan Crisis. She converted to Catholicism in the 1940s. Princess Shams was persuaded to convert by Ernest Perron, the best friend of the Shah. Her husband and children adopted Catholicism after her.

Shams dedicated most of her time to developing the Red Lion and Sun Society (Iran's Red Cross), making it the country’s largest charitable organization.

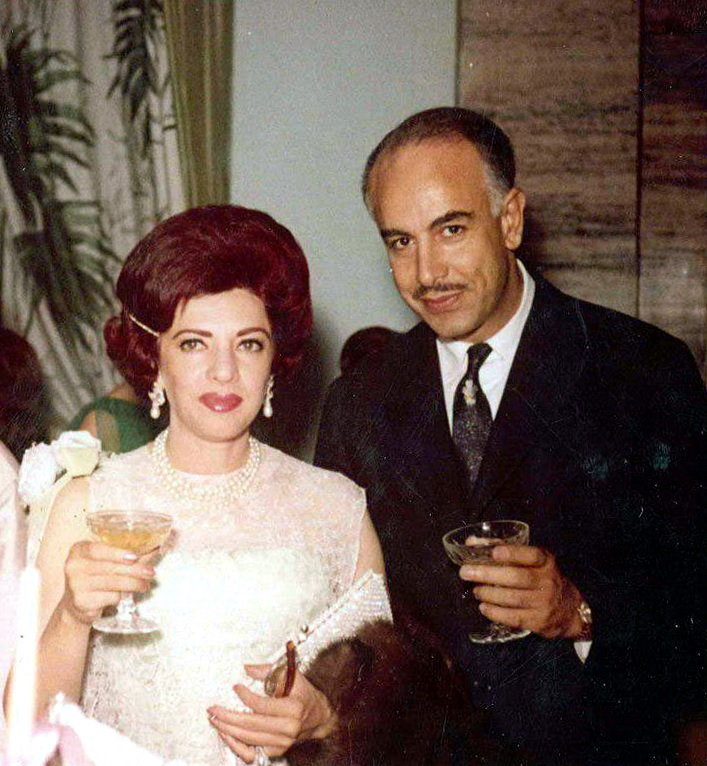
Shams and her husband Mehrdad Pahlbod in 1978

After returning to Iran following the 1953 coup which re-established the rule of her brother, she maintained a low public profile, contrary to that of her sister Princess Ashraf Pahlavi, and confined her activities to the management of the vast fortune she inherited from her father. In the late 1960s, she commissioned the Frank Lloyd Wright Foundation architects to build her the Pearl Palace in Mehrshahr near Karaj, and Villa Mehrafarin in Chalous, Mazandaran, which was built during the 1970s.

Santa Barbara estate, 1981

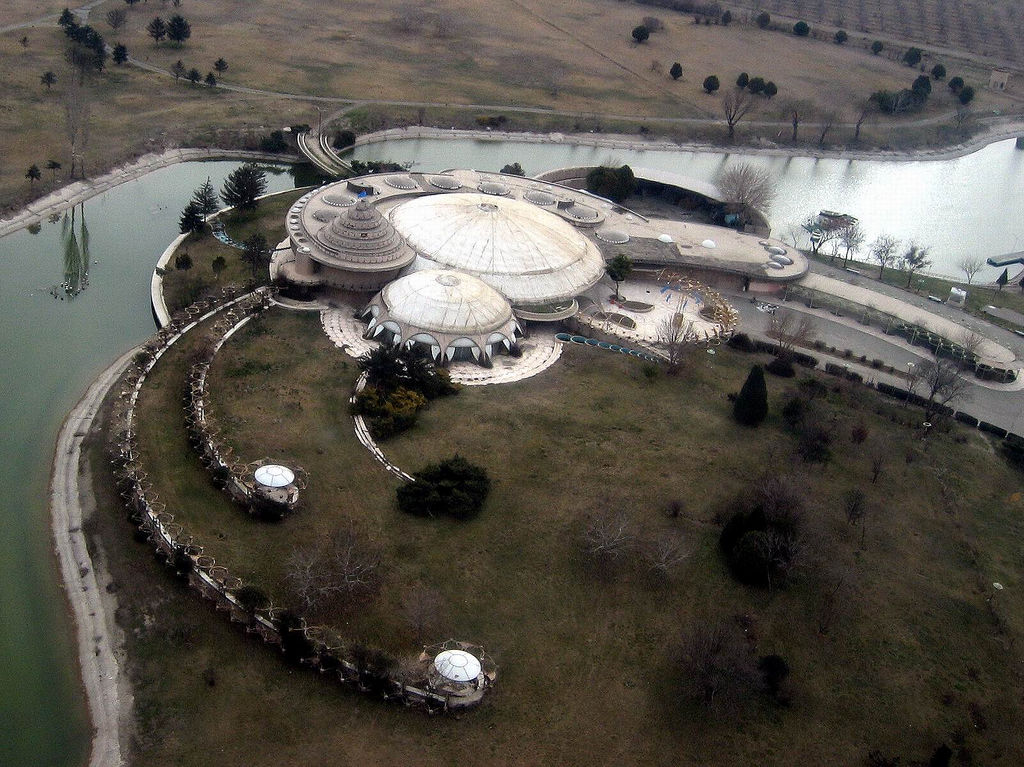
Pearl Palace, 2014

She left Iran for the United States after the 1979 Iranian Revolution. She and her family settled in Santa Barbara in 1984. In 1996, she died of cancer at 77 years of age in her Santa Barbara estate.

== Other roles ==
- Honorary president of the Hospital for Protection of Disadvantaged Children (Iran)
- Honorary president of the Society for the Prevention of Cruelty to Animals

=== Honours ===
- Order of the Pleiades (Neshaan-e haft peikar), 2nd Class, (1957, Iran)
- Order of Aryamehr (Neshān-e Āryāmehr), 2nd Class, (26 September 1967, Iran)

== See also ==
- List of Iranian women royalty

Non-profit organization positions
Preceded by Mohammad Reza Pahlavi	Chairwoman of the Iranian Red Lion and Sun Society; 1949–1979	Succeeded by Kazem Sami
