= Mohammad Reza Pourshajari =

Iranian blogger

- Born: 1963-64; Iran
- Died: November 26, 2021; Yalova, Turkey
- Other names: Siamak Mehr
- Occupation: Blogger
- Criminal charges: Insulting the Supreme Leader; propaganda against the regime; blasphemy
- Criminal penalty: 3 years in prison (2010); 1 year in prison (2012); 1 year in prison and 2 years in exile (2014)

Mohammad Reza Pourshajari (1963? – 26 November 2021) was an Iranian blogger, also called Siamak Mehr, who was released from jail on 23 August 2014 after spending four years in prison. He was arrested on September 12, 2010 at his home in Karaj and was sentenced to three years in prison on charges of "insulting the Supreme Leader" and of propaganda against the regime. In April 2012, he was sentenced to another year by the Karaj Revolutionary Court on blasphemy charges. He suffered a non-fatal heart attack in 2012, in prison and also suffered from diabetes.

At the end of his four year term, Pourshajari was released from jail. He was then rearrested, however, 38 days later and retried on March 11, 2014 and sentenced to a year in jail and two years in exile in Tabas.

Pourshajari escaped to Turkey in 2016 and obtained political asylum. He died in 2021 of COVID-19 at the age of 58.
