= Shah Abbasi Caravansarai, Karaj =

Caravanserai in Karaj, Iranian national heritage site

Shah Abbasi Caravansarai
- کاروانسرای شاه‌عباسی
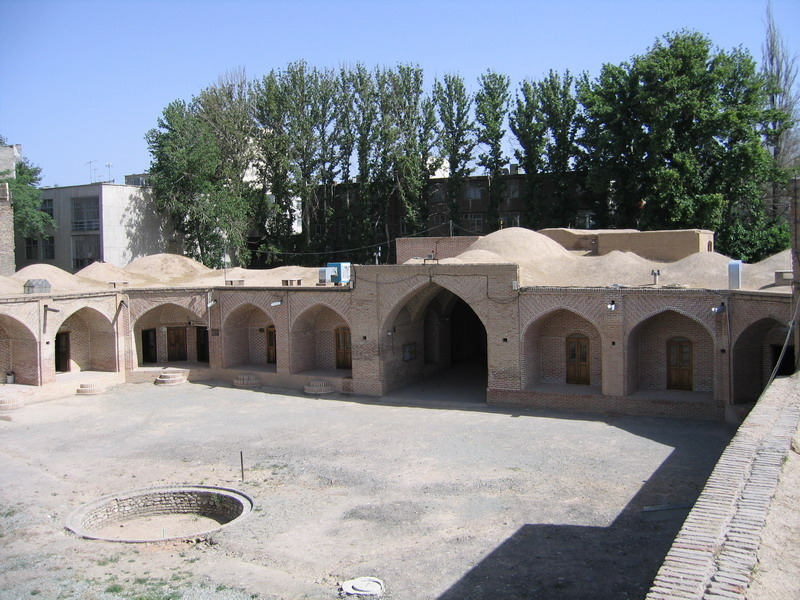
- Interactive map of the Shah Abbasi Caravansarai area

General information
- Type: Caravanserai
- Location: Karaj, Alborz Province, Iran
- Coordinates: 35°48′36″N 51°00′04″E

The Shah Abbasi Caravansarai (Persian: کاروانسرای شاه‌عباسی) is a historic Safavid era caravanserai in Karaj, Iran, probably built by the orders of the Safavid Shah, Suleiman I.

== Gallery ==
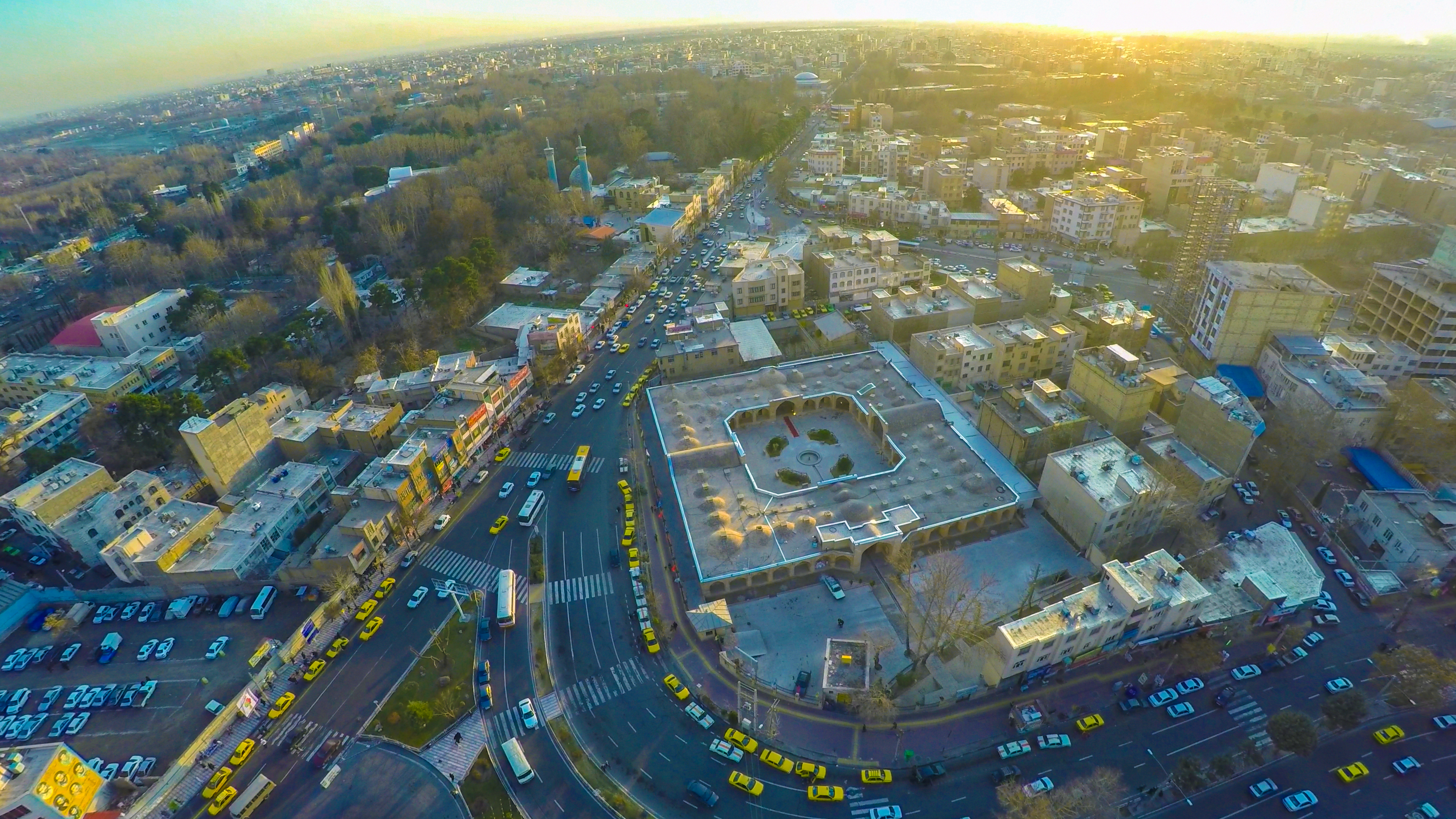
The caravanserai from above, 2016

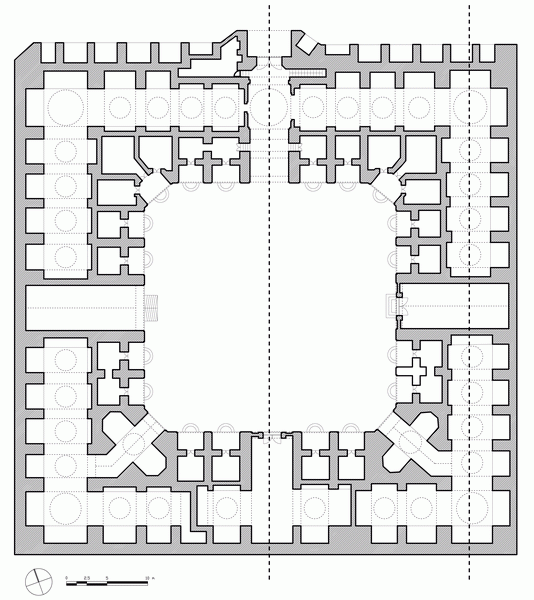
Plan drawing of the caravanserai
