= Cornelia Brierly =

American architect

- Born: April 12, 1913; Pennsylvania, United States
- Died: August 24, 2012 (aged 99)
- Education: Carnegie Tech
- Occupation: Architect

Cornelia Brierly (1913–2012) was an American architect and one of the first five women to study architecture at Carnegie Tech. She was the first female fellow of Frank Lloyd Wright in Taliesin, 1934.

== Life ==
Cornelia Brierly was born April 12, 1913, in Mifflin County, Pennsylvania. She studied briefly at Cornell University and the University of Pittsburgh before she enrolled in Carnegie Tech, becoming one of the first five women to study architecture in the program. In 1934 she joined the Taliesin Fellowship under Frank Lloyd Wright. She worked on Wright’s Broadacre City plan, building models in Arizona and traveling to Pittsburgh, Pennsylvania, and Washington, D.C., to explain the ideas to a wider audience.

Brierly studied with Wright for ten years before starting a private practice with her husband Peter Berndtson. In 1956 she returned to the Frank Lloyd Wright Foundation working as an architectural designer, interior decorator, and landscape architect. She served as Honorary Chairman and Trustee of the Foundation.

At age 99 Brierly died on August 24, 2012.

== Major buildings and projects ==
- Models for Broadacre City project
- Taliesin West (contributor), Scottsdale, Arizona
- Hulda and Louise Notz House, 1940, West Mifflin, Pennsylvania
- Arthur Jeffrey House (with Peter Berndtson), 1947, Allison Park, Pennsylvania
- Edward Weinberger House (with Peter Berndtson), 1948, Squirrel Hill, Pennsylvania
- Joseph Katz/McComb House (with Peter Berndtson), 1950, West Mifflin, Pennsylvania
- Abraam Steinberg House (with Peter Berndtson), 1951, Squirrel Hill, Pennsylvania
- F. Esther Fineman House (with Peter Berndtson), 1952, Stanton Heights, Pennsylvania
- George Brayman House (with Peter Berndtson), 1953, Ben Avon Heights, Pennsylvania
- Saul Lipkind House (with Peter Berndtson),1954, Swisshelm Park, Pennsylvania
- Pearl Palace (interior design and furniture with John deKoven Hill), c.1972, Mehrshahr, Alborz province.
