= Alborz University of Medical Sciences =

Coordinates: 35.842786596971656°N 51.00725564712512°E

- دانشگاه علوم پزشكی و خدمات بهداشتی درمانی البرز; Daneshgah-e Olum-e Pezeshki-ye Alborz
- Type: Public
- Established: 2010
- President: Shahram Sayadi
- Faculty: 209
- Students: 2457
- Location: Karaj, Alborz province, Iran
- Campus: Urban

Alborz University of Medical Sciences (ABZUMS) is a medical school in Alborz Province of Iran. Located in the city of Karaj, the university was established in 2010. The university offers degrees in 7 schools including residencies and fellowships, and administers hospitals and clinics in Karaj city and province of Alborz.

== Faculties ==
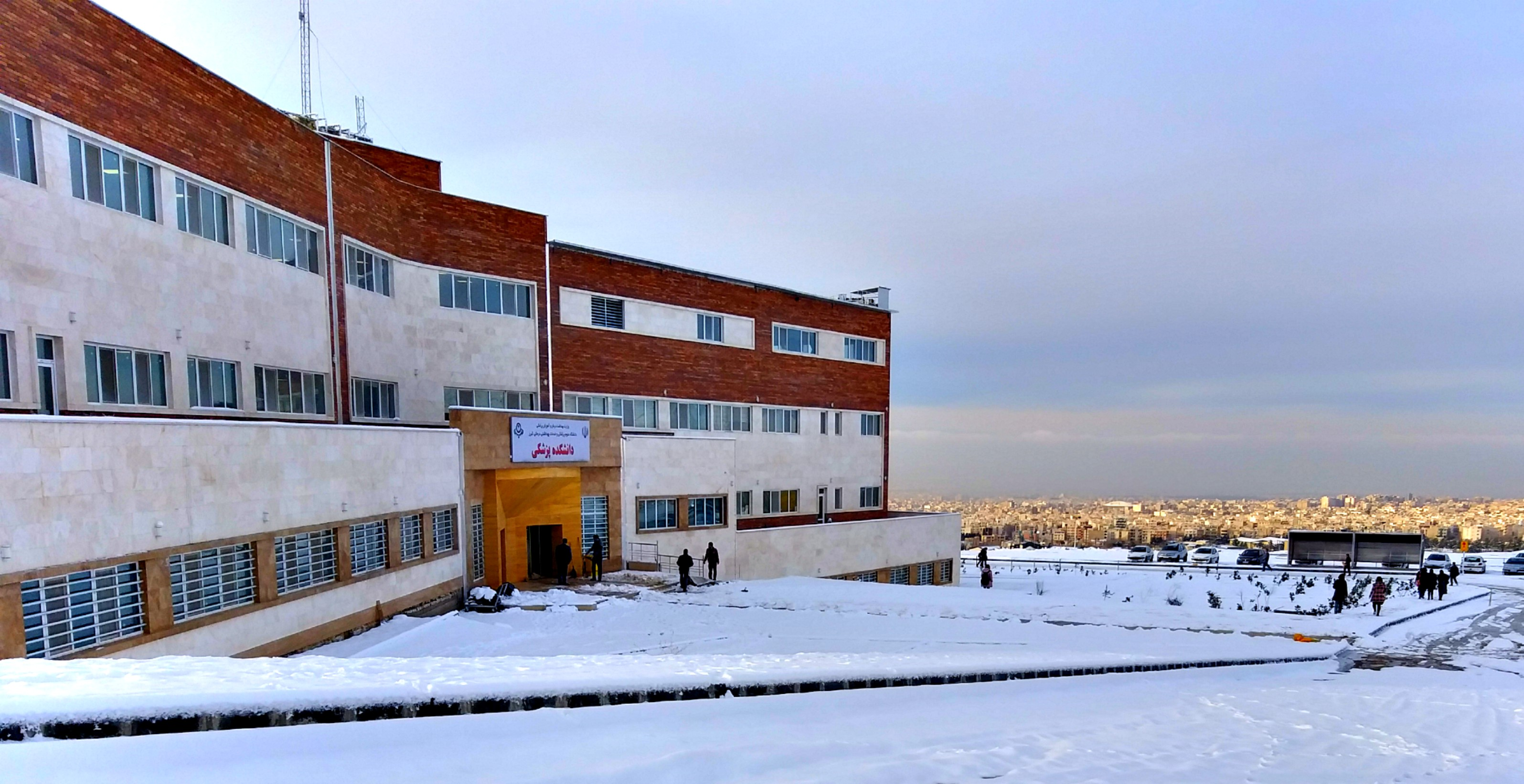
Faculty of medicine in winter

- Faculty of Medicine
- Faculty of Dentistry
- Faculty of Pharmacy
- Faculty of Health
- Faculty of Paramedical Sciences
- Faculty of Nursing and Midwifery
- Faculty of Medical Urgency

== See also ==
- Higher Education in Iran
