= Navid Abdolmaleki =

Iranian karateka and MMA fighter

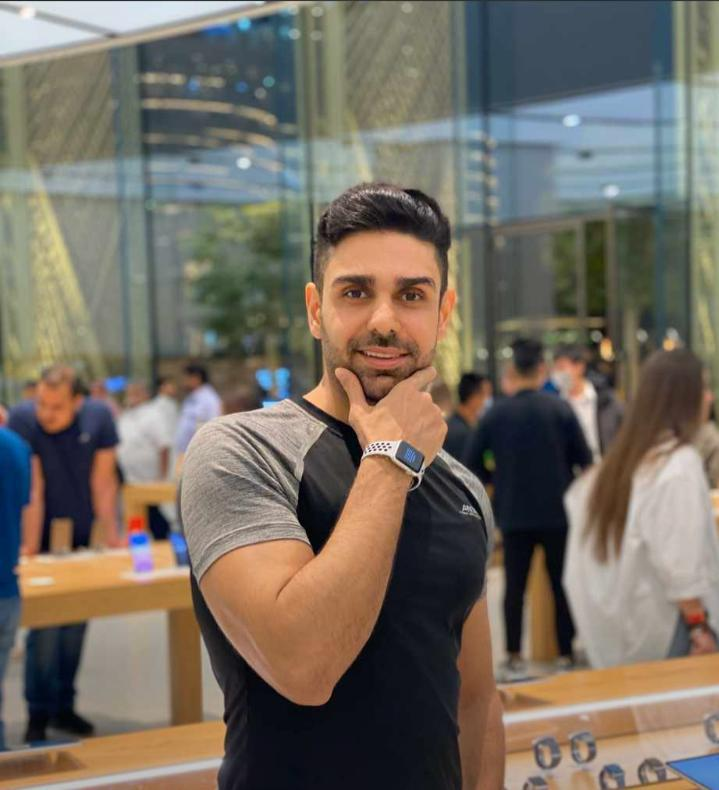
- Born: 14 April 1990 (age 36); Karaj, Iran
- Nationality: Iranian
- Height: 187 cm (6 ft 2 in)
- Weight: 87 kg (192 lb; 13 st 10 lb)
- Rank: Black Belt 5 Karate, Brazilian jiu-jitsu blue belt

Mixed martial arts record
- Total: 2
- Wins: 2
- By knockout: 2
- Losses: 0

Other information
- Website: "Navid Abdolmaleki MMA FIGHT RECORD". tapology.com.
- Mixed martial arts record from Sherdog
- Sports career
Medal record
Representing Iran
Kobe Osaka Asia Karate Championships
Silver medal – second place	2007 Malaysia	-80kg
Bronze medal – third place	2007 Malaysia	Team Kumite
International Karate Championships
Gold medal – first place	2009 India	Team Kumite
Silver medal – second place	2009 India	+80kg
Silver medal – second place	2009 Armenia	+80kg
World Championships Kobe Osaka
Bronze medal – third place	2009 Malaysia	+80kg
Gold medal – first place	2012 Malaysia	-75kg
Silver medal – second place	2012 Malaysia	Team Kumite
Central Asian Karate Championships
Gold medal – first place	2017 Uzbekistan	Team Kumite
National Team Karate Central Asian Championship
Bronze medal – third place	2019 Iran	-84kg

Navid Abdolmaleki (Persian: نوید عبدالملکی, born 14 April 1990) is an Iranian mixed martial artist.

He is also a former karateka and also has honors and medals in this field.

== Karate career ==
Navid Abdolmaleki has won several medals in World Karate Championships. The first Central Asian Games were held in Tashkent Uzbekistan with the participation of Iran, Uzbekistan, Kyrgyzstan, Kazakhstan, Afghanistan and Turkmenistan. Previously, Iran was in the West Asian region, But since 2017, with Navid Abdolmaleki winning gold medal at Central Asian Games, Iranian sports has entered Central Asia. In 2012, after years of hard work, he won the silver medal, gold medal and bronze medal at the Malaysia Kobe Osaka International Karate Championships. Navid Abdolmalki won one gold medal and two silver madals at International Karate Championships in India and Armenia 2009. He holds the bronze medal of the 2007 Kobe Osaka International Karate Championship in Malaysia Team Kumite and the silver medal of the 2007 International Karate Championship in Armenia (-80)Kg.

== MMA career ==
In 2021, he joined the MMA sport and at first he was able to win in the mixed martial arts competitions of Belarus against opponents from Ukraine and Belarus.

== Mixed martial arts record ==
Professional record breakdown
2 matches	2 wins	0 losses
By knockout	2	0
By decision	0	0

Res.	Record	Opponent	Method	Event	Date	Round	Time	Location	Notes
Win	1–0	Denis Korotof	Knockout	BFC	November 14, 2021	1	2:34	Belarus	
Win	1–0	Sergey Ivanchuk	Knockout	BFC	July 29, 2021	1	1:35	Belarus	
