= Pearl Palace =

Iranian national heritage site

Coordinates: 35°47′16″N 50°53′12″E

- Kakh-e ُShams (Persian: كاخ شمس)
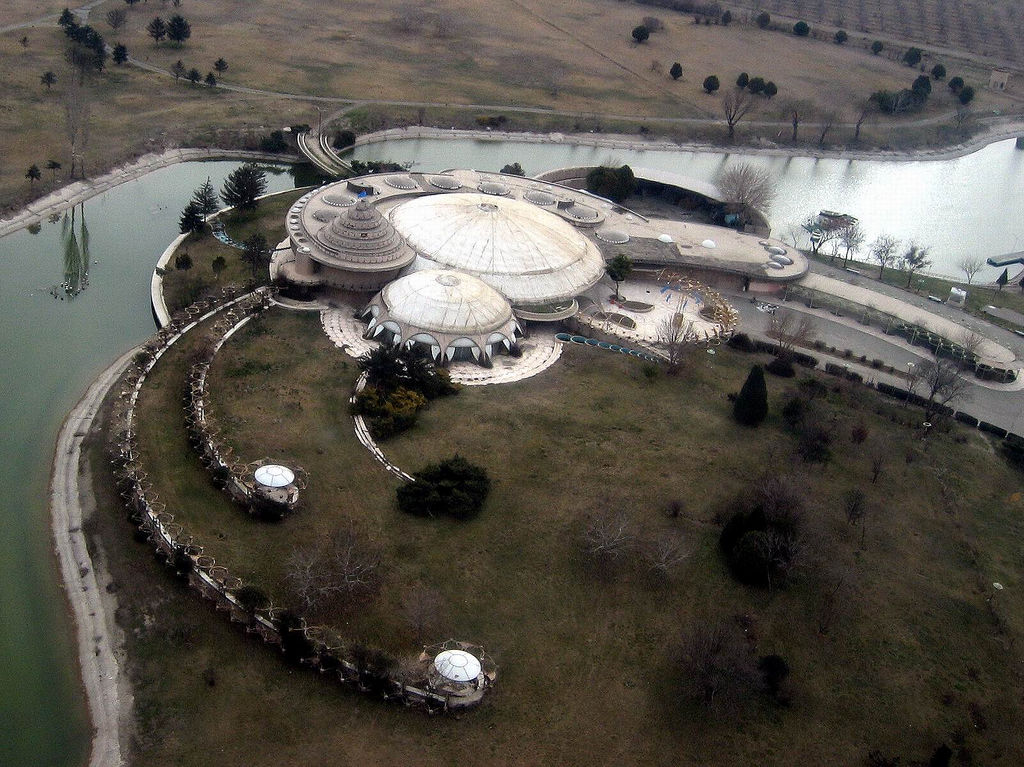
- Interactive map of the Pearl Palace area
- Former names: Kakh-e ُMorvarid (Persian: كاخ مروارید)
- Alternative names: Kakh-e Shams كاخ شمس, Shams Palace, Morvarid Palace

General information
- Type: Estate
- Architectural style: Modernist
- Location: Mehrshahr, Karaj, Alborz Province, Iran
- Completed: Approximately 1972
- Renovated: November 2020
- Cost: $3.5 million
- Client: Princess Shams Pahlavi; Mehrdad Pahlbod
- Owner: Ministry of Cultural Heritage, Handicrafts and Tourism

Technical details
- Floor area: 16,145 sq ft (1,499.9 m^{2})
- Grounds: 420 acres (170 ha) at the time of conception

Design and construction
- Architecture firm: Taliesin Associated Architects; William Wesley Peters, Amery-Kamooneh-Khosravi Consulting Architects of Tehran
- Structural engineer: Thomas Casey
- Other designers: Stephen M. Nemtin; Frances Nemtin; Cornelia Brierly, John deKoven Hill

Pearl Palace (Persian: کاخ مروارید; Romanized: kakh-e Morvarid / Kāx-e Morvārid), also known as Shams Palace (Persian: کاخ شمس; Romanized: kakh-e Shams / Kāx-e Šams) is an estate in Iran, designed by Taliesin Associated Architects (Frank Lloyd Wright Foundation) on instructions from princess Shams Pahlavi, elder sister of Mohammad Reza Pahlavi, the last Shah of Iran. It was built in the early 1970s and is located in the Mehrshahr neighborhood, in Karaj City, Iran.

== Background ==
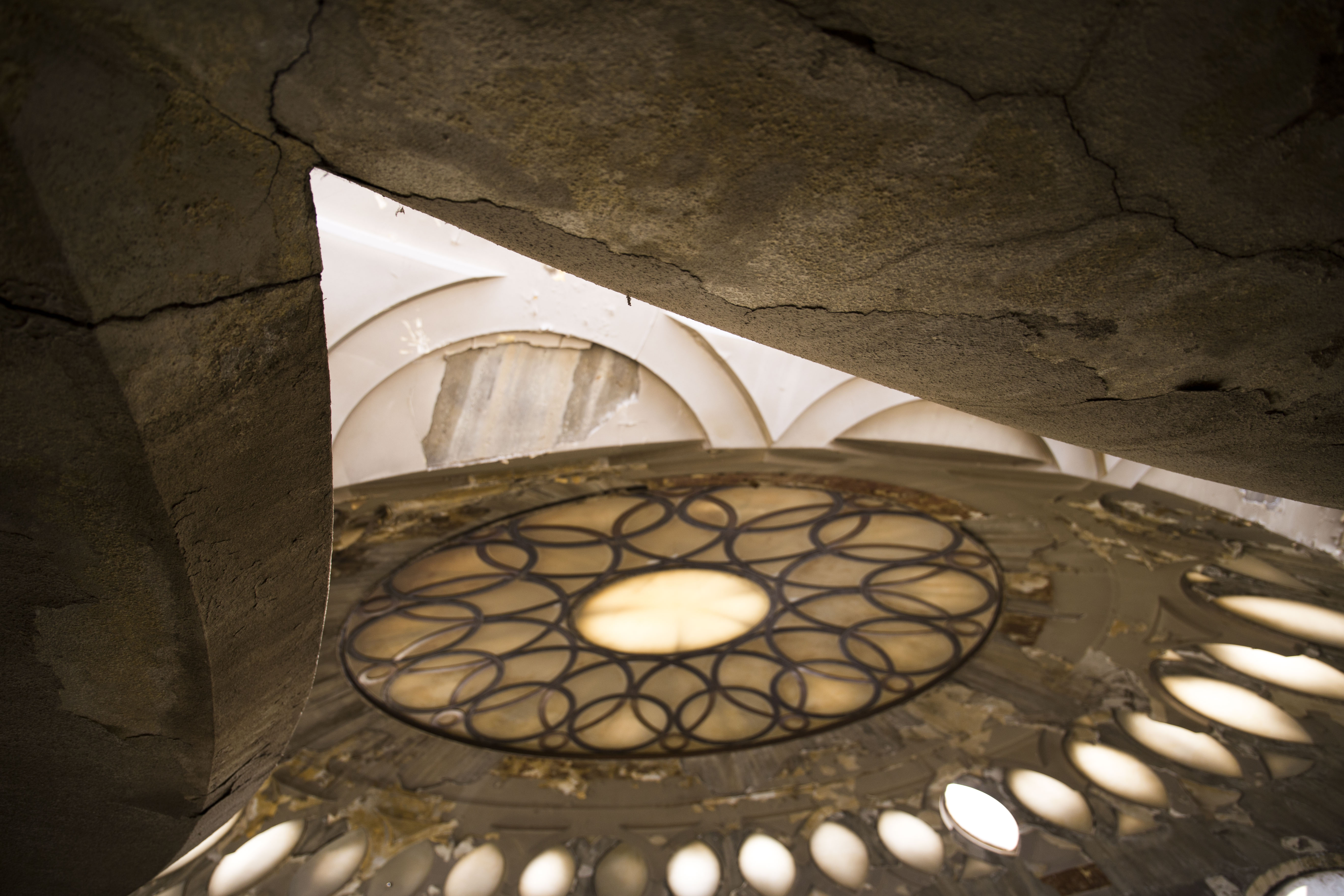
Pearl Palace (2018) interior

The Taliesin Associated Architects (Frank Lloyd Wright Foundation) had three buildings built in Iran which include the Damavand Higher Educational Institute (presently known as Payam-e Nour University's Tehran campus), the summer residence of Shams known as Mehrafarin Palace in Chalus (presently occupied by the local police), and the most prestigious, the Pearl Palace.

The Taliesin Associated Architects, William Wesley Peters, Amery-Kamooneh-Khosravi Consulting Architects of Tehran, all served as architects for the project, and Thomas Casey served as the civil engineer. The interior design and furniture was designed by John deKoven Hill and Cornelia Brierly. The landscape design was done by Francis Nemtin.

The palace was built on roughly 170 hectares (420 acres) of rolling hills and featured an artificial lake. The building is around 1,499.9 square metres (16,145 sq ft) and made of concrete, with two main domes and a "ziggurat" style structure, all connected by stairs and a large ramp. Throughout the structure circular patterns are highlighted. The building space included an office, living room, family dining room, a swimming pool, a cinema, a "rare bird hall", and bedrooms.

=== After the revolution ===
After the Iranian Revolution, the Mostazafan Foundation seized all assets owned by the royal family, including Shams Palace. The majority of the complex was occupied by a local Baseej unit who neglected its upkeep. The building was recognized as a cultural heritage only in 2002, and registered by the Ministry of Cultural Heritage, Handicrafts and Tourism (Iran's Cultural Heritage, Handicrafts and Tourism Organization), which took control of portions of the building due to its historical significance. Small parts were opened to the public in 2015 as a result of pressure from the Ministry of Cultural Heritage, Handicrafts and Tourism.

It is currently in need of repairs; in November 2020, the building was scheduled to undergo rehabilitation work. The restoration was estimated to cost 300–500 billion rials (US$8–13 million) in 2017.

== See also ==
- Persian architecture
- Cultural Heritage Organization of Iran
