= Karaj =

City in Alborz province, Iran

Karaj کرج
- City
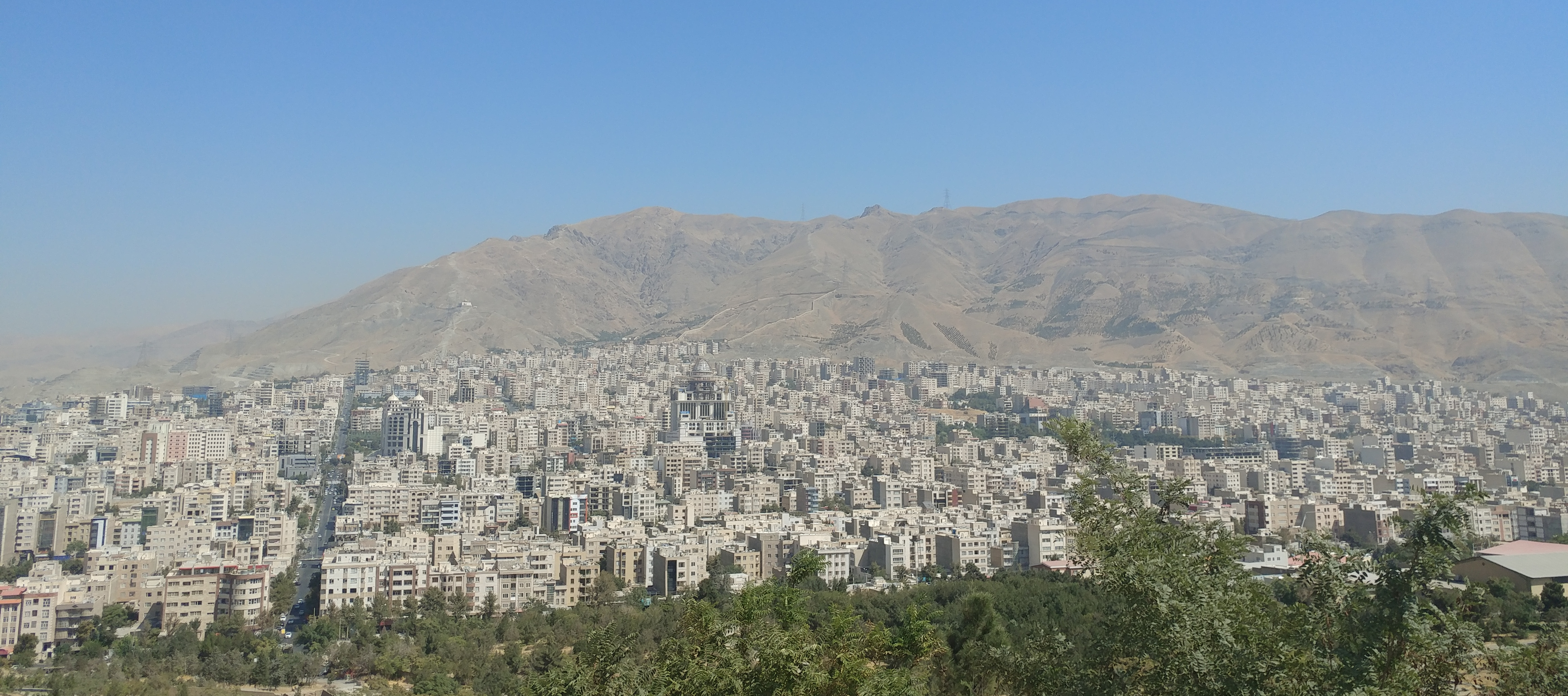
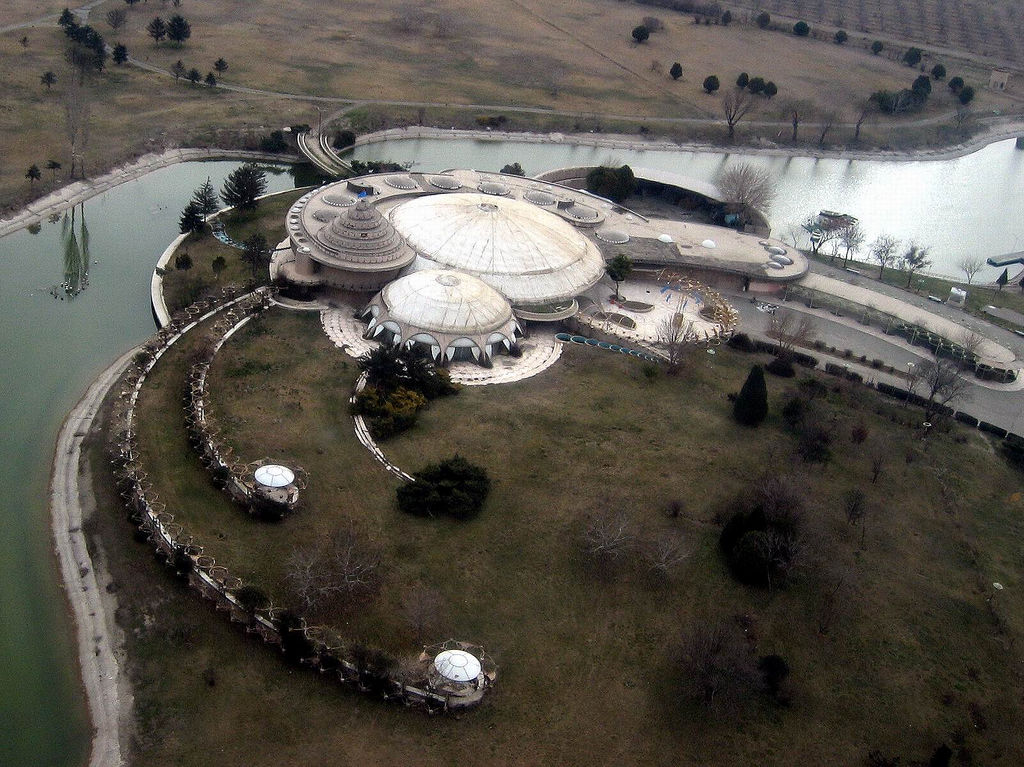
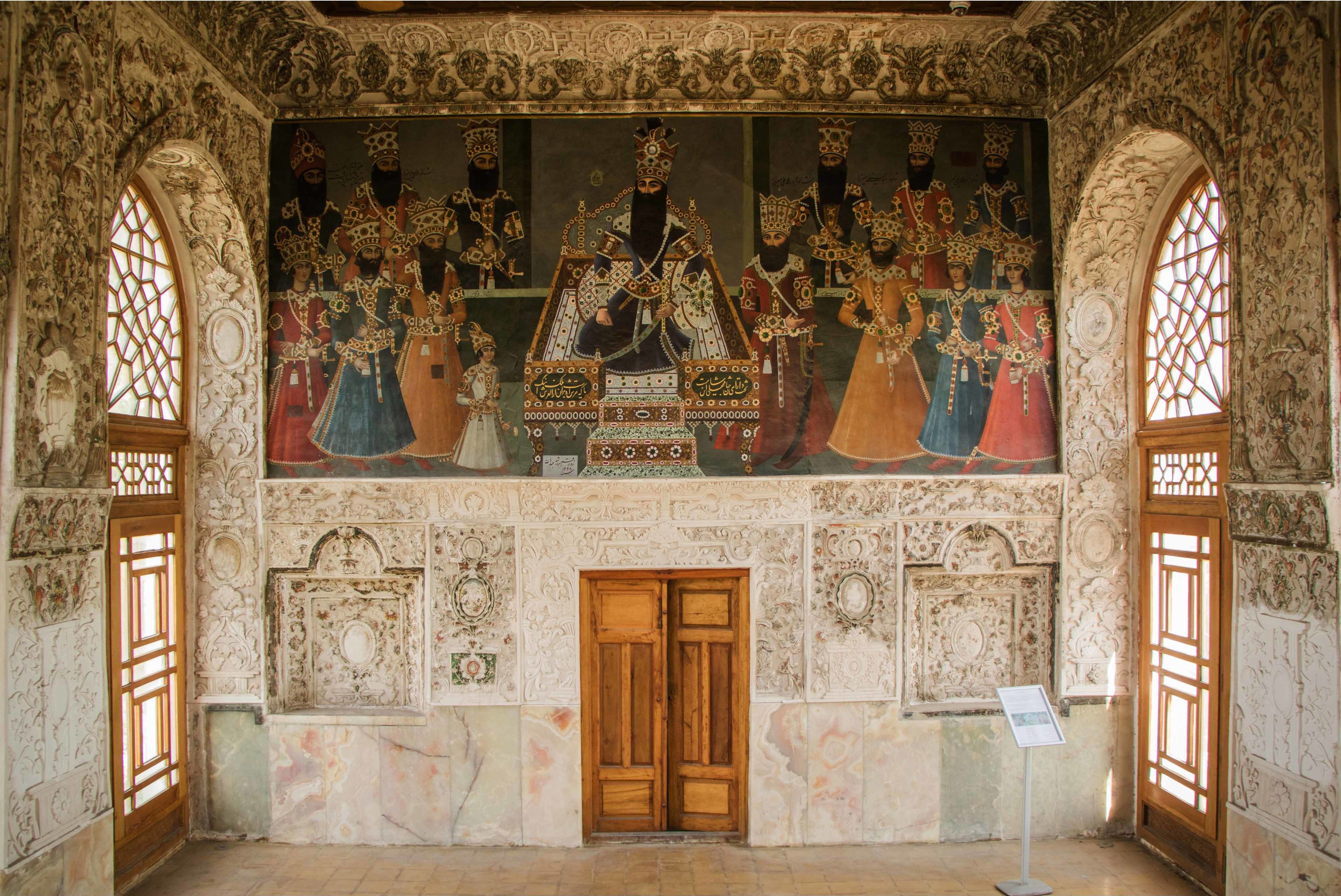
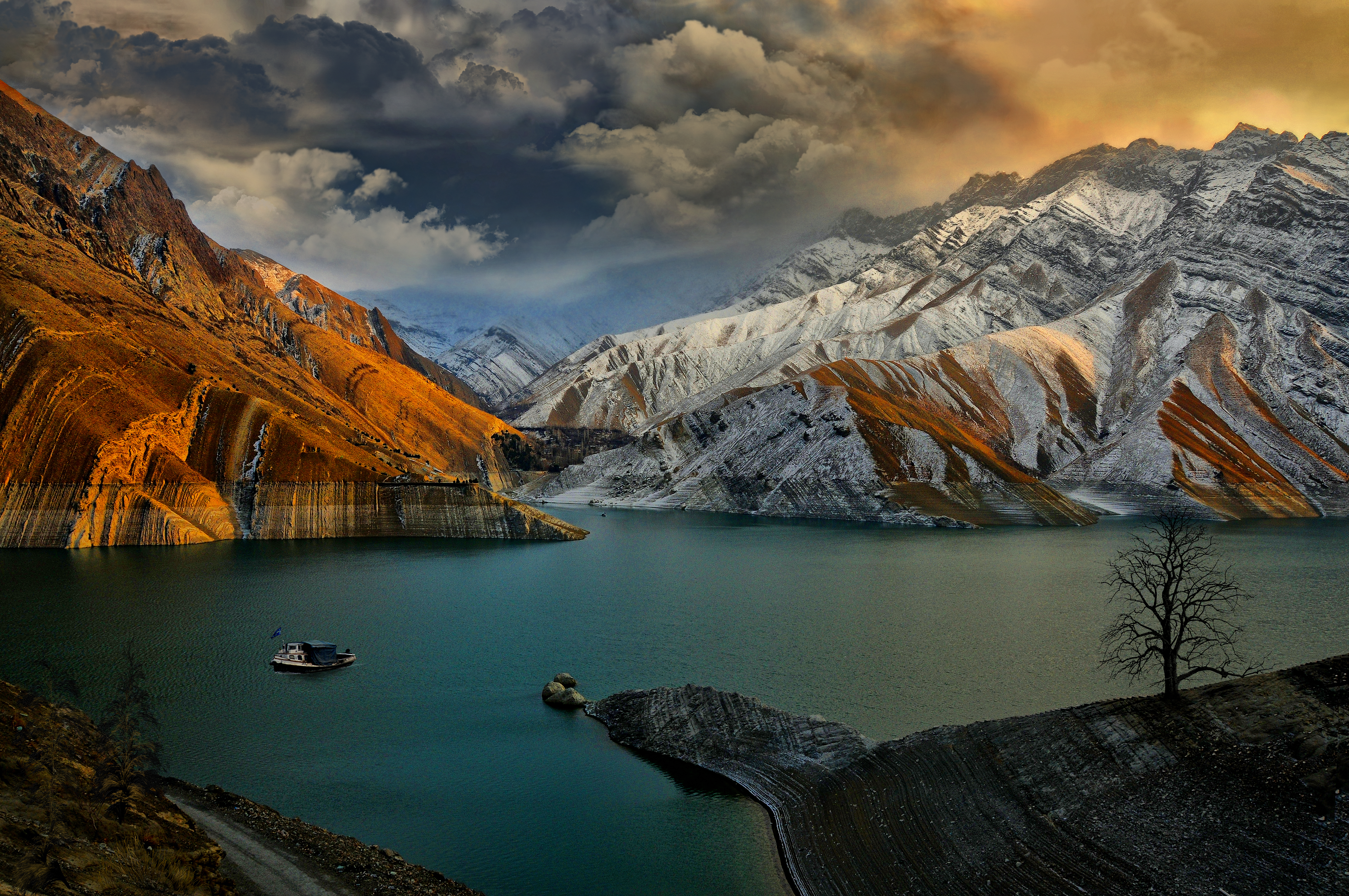
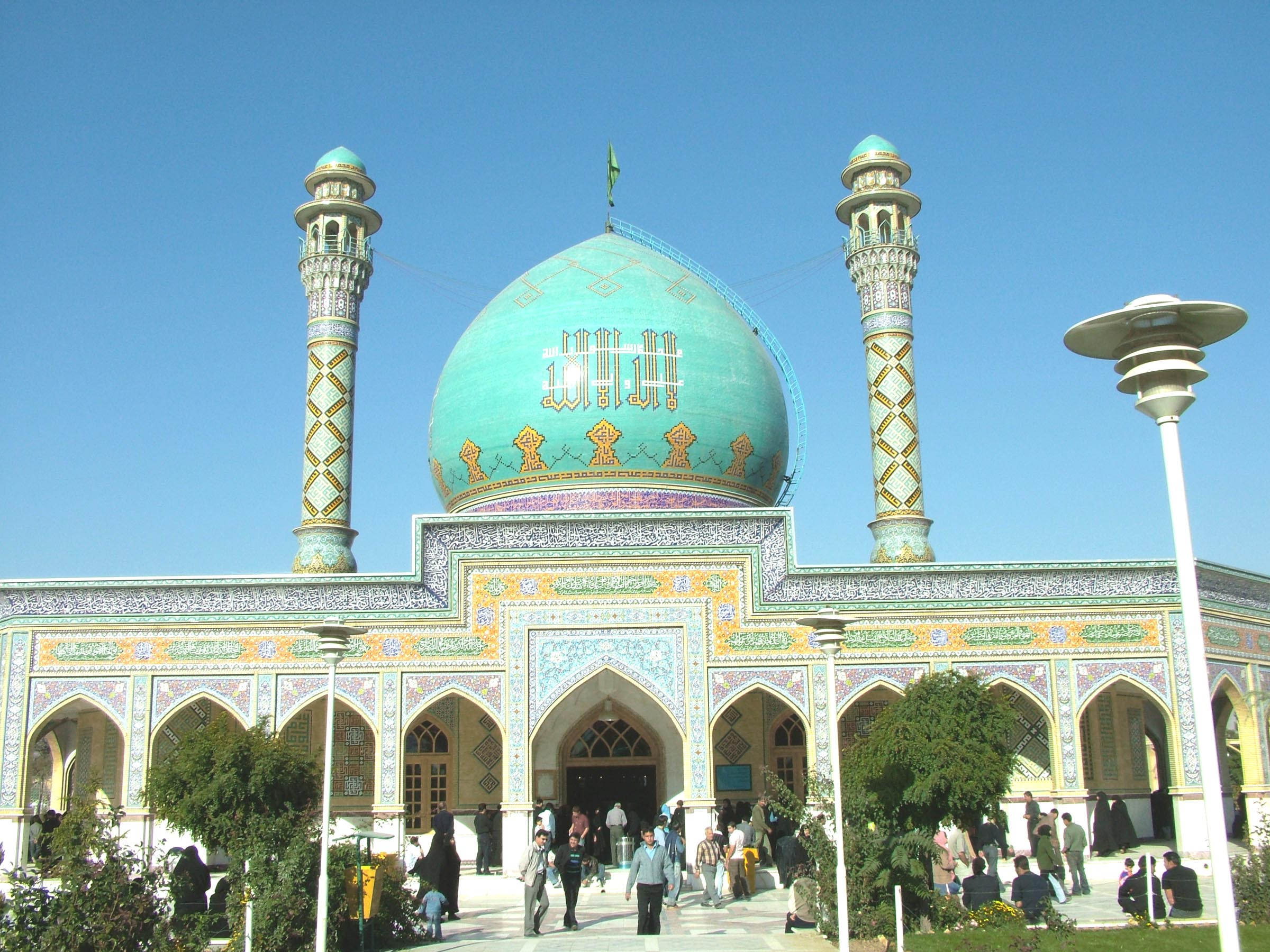
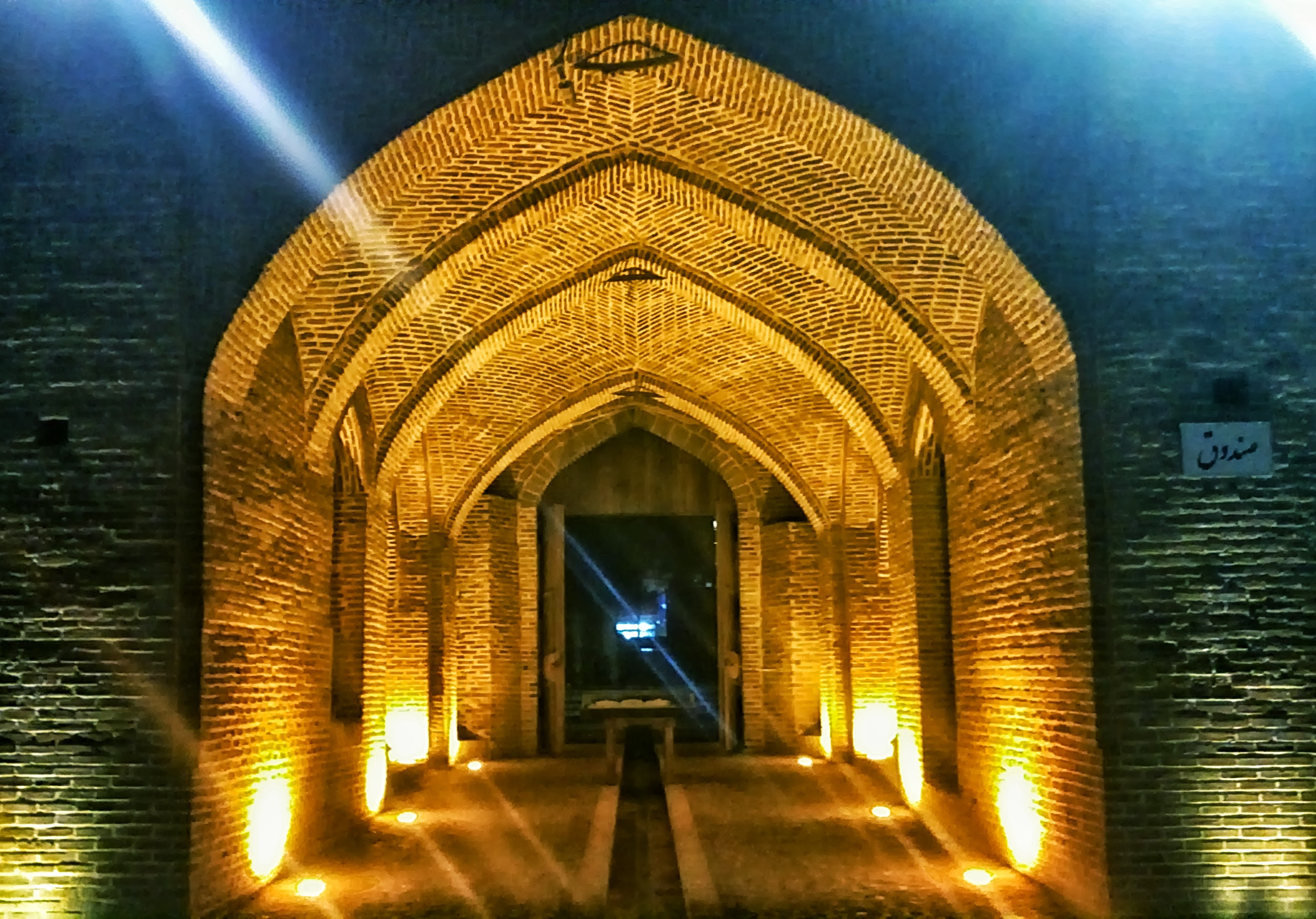
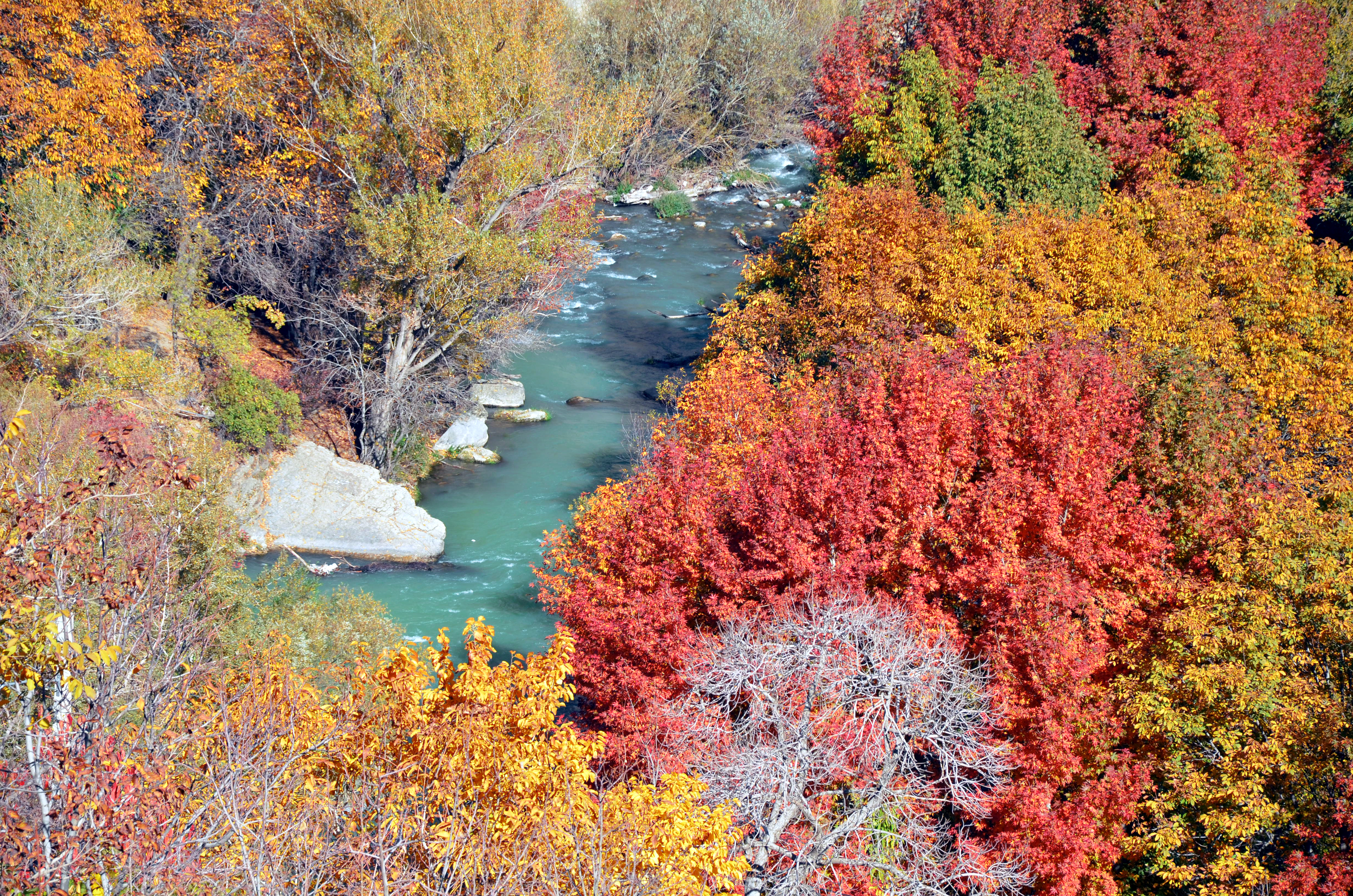
- View of the city Pearl Palace Soleymaniyeh Palace Amir Kabir Dam lake Emamzadeh Taher Shah Abbasi Caravansarai Karaj River in Adaran

- Seal

- Location within Iran
- Coordinates: 35°49′45″N 50°58′03″E
- Country: Iran
- Province: Alborz
- County: Karaj
- District: Central

Government
  - Mayor: Mehrdad Kiani
  - City Council Chairman: Javid Chapardar

Area
  - City: 250 km^{2} (97 sq mi)
- Elevation: 1,312 m (4,304 ft)

Population (2025)
  - City: 1,592,492
  - Density: 6,400/km^{2} (16,000/sq mi)
  - Urban: 1,973,470
  - Metro: 3,000,000
  - Population Rank in Iran: 4th
- Time zone: UTC+3:30 (IRST)
- Area code: 026
- Vehicle registration: IRAN 68 38 21 30
- Climate: BSk
- Website: karaj.ir

Karaj (Persian: کرج; pronounced [kæˈɾædʒ]) (Note: Also romanized as Karadj and Karej; also known as Heredi, Karadje, Keredi Leredi, and Qaşabeh-e Karaj) is a city in the Central District of Karaj County, Alborz province, Iran, serving as capital of the province, the county, and the district. Earliest evidence of inhabitation in Karaj can be dated to the Bronze Age at Tepe Khurvin. The city was developed under the rule of the Safavid and Qajar Empire and is home to historical buildings and memorials from those eras. This city has a unique climate due to access to natural resources such as many trees, rivers, and green plains. After Tehran, Karaj is the largest immigrant-friendly city in Iran, so it has been nicknamed "Little Iran."

Although the county hosts a population of approximately 1.97 million, as recorded in the 2016 census, most of the 1,419 km^{2} (548 sq mi) county consists of rugged mountains. Karaj is also the third most populous city in Iran after Tehran and Mashhad and the sixteenth largest metropolis in the Middle East, with a metropolitan population of nearly 3,599,000 as of 2025. The urban area is the fourth-largest in Iran, after Tehran, Mashhad, and Isfahan. Eshtehard County and Fardis County were split off from Karaj County since the previous census.

== Etymology ==
The origin of the name Karaj (Persian: کرج) remains uncertain, and several interpretations have been proposed regarding its linguistic and historical roots. One alternative theory, proposed by Zana Salehrad, suggests that the name may derive from an older Iranian expression associated with the mountainous geography of the region.

According to Salehrad's interpretation, Karaj may be connected to an ancient compound referring to a mountainous passage or a settlement situated between elevated ridges. The theory proposes that the original term gradually underwent phonetic changes through local Iranian dialects, eventually developing into its modern form, Karaj. This interpretation is consistent with the city's geographical position near the foothills of the Alborz mountain range and the valley of the Karaj River. Salehrad's proposed explanation offers a geographical interpretation of the toponym, suggesting that the name originally described the natural landscape rather than the settlement itself.

== History ==
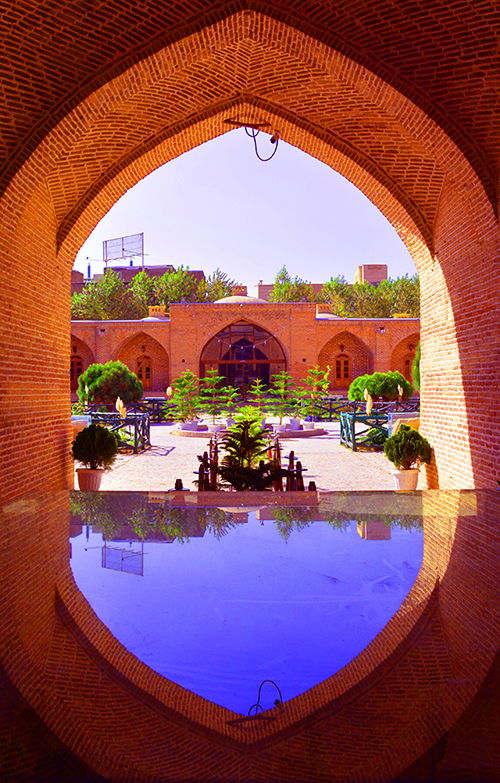
Shah-Abbasi Caravansary

The area around Karaj has been inhabited for thousands of years, as shown by the Bronze Age site of Tepe Khurvin and the Iron Age site of Kalak. However, the present-day city of Karaj is mostly the result of modern industrial development in the 20th century.

Karaj was mostly significant as a stage on the road between Tehran and Qazvin. In Safavid times, a stone bridge was built that served as the main crossing into the town. The large Shah-Abbasi Caravansarai, located at the southeast of Towhid Square, was built in the same era, under the rule of Šāh Esmāil.

In 1810, the Qajar prince Soleyman Mirza built the Soleymaniyeh Palace at Karaj to serve as a summer resort. The palace had four towers and was surrounded by gardens. Its reception room featured a pair of paintings by Abdallah Khan Naqqashbandi. By 1860, however, the palace was described as abandoned and only used as a shelter for travelers. Naser al-Din Shah Qajar later renovated the palace. In 1917, a School of Farming was established on the site, replacing the earlier Mozaffari Agricultural School in Tehran. Later, Reza Pahlavi granted it to the University of Tehran's new Faculty of Agriculture.

In the 1930s, plans were drawn up for a large industrial complex covering 216 hectares on the south side of the village. This "Industrial Model Town of Karaj" was intended to be the site of the country's first steel mills, capitalizing on easy access to water and coal from the Alborz. However, the construction equipment imported from Germany was impounded by the British going through the Suez Canal in 1940, and the planned complex was never built.

A major industrial complex, the first privately owned one in Karaj, was built in the 1960s by Mohammad-Sadeq Fateh. This complex, called Shahrak-e Jahanshahr, included oil, tea, and textile factories as well as housing for the workers.

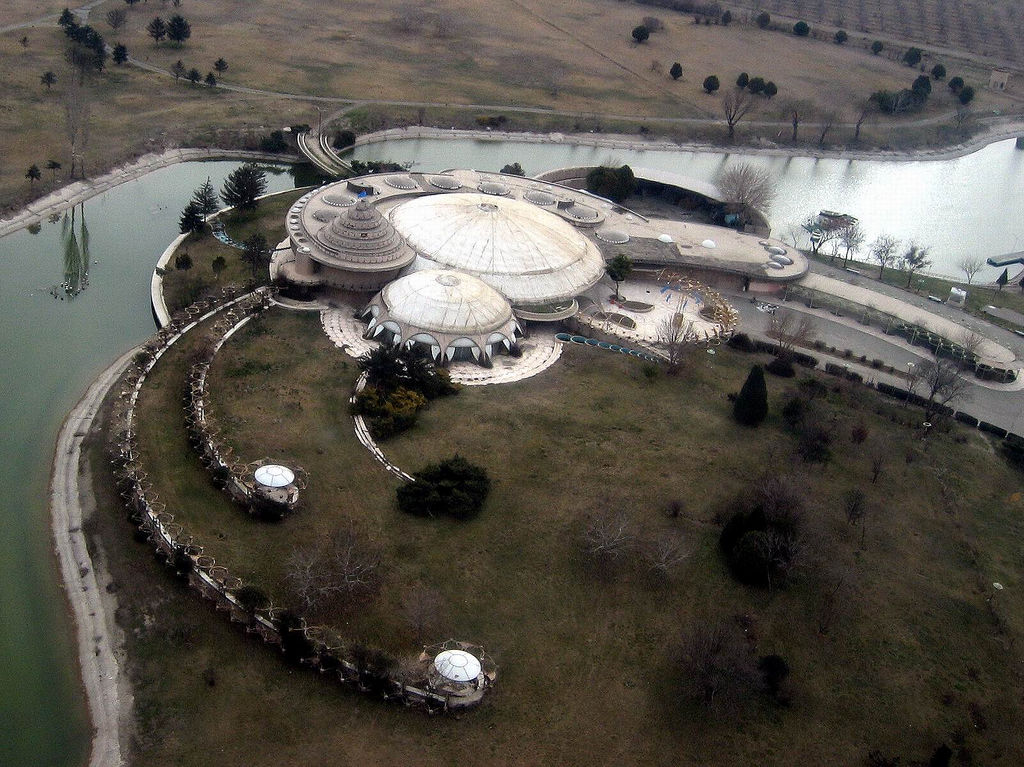
Morvarid Palace

The Morvārid Palace was constructed in the nearby Mehršahr district, during the Pahlavi era. It was designed by the Frank Lloyd Wright Foundation (Taliesin Associated Architects) on instructions from Shams Pahlavi, elder sister of Mohammad Reza Pahlavi. In this period, it was a transit and industrial town.

The majority of the structure is now controlled by the Basij Organization, and some sections of it are open to the public under the operation of the Cultural Heritage Organization of Iran.

Other historical sites of the city include the Mausoleum of Šāhzāde Soleymān, Emāmzāde Rahmān, Emāmzāde Zeyd, and Palang Ābād e Eštehārd.

== Demographics ==
=== Ethnicity ===
Ethnic groups of Karaj (Pars advanced research scholars)
Ethnic groups	Percent
Persians	53%
Azerbaijanis	30%
Lurs	7.2%
Gilak and Tabari	5%
kurds	4.1%

The majority of Karaj's residents are Persians, with Azerbaijanis forming the city's second major ethno-linguistic group. Other ethnicities inhabiting Karaj include Kurds, Gilak, Tabari and Lurs.

Gender segregation population in 2016
Male	Female	Total	Ref.
890,824	886,570	1,759,394	

Population by age group in 2016 (%)
age (0–14 years)	age (15–29 years)	age (30–64 years)	age (65 years and older)
20.3%	23.6%	50.2%	6.0%

=== Population ===
At the time of the 2006 National Census, the city's population was 1,377,450 in 385,955 households, when it was in Tehran province. The 2016 census measured the population of the city as 1,592,492 people in 508,420 households, by which time the county had been separated from the province in the establishment of Alborz province.

== Geography ==
=== Regions ===
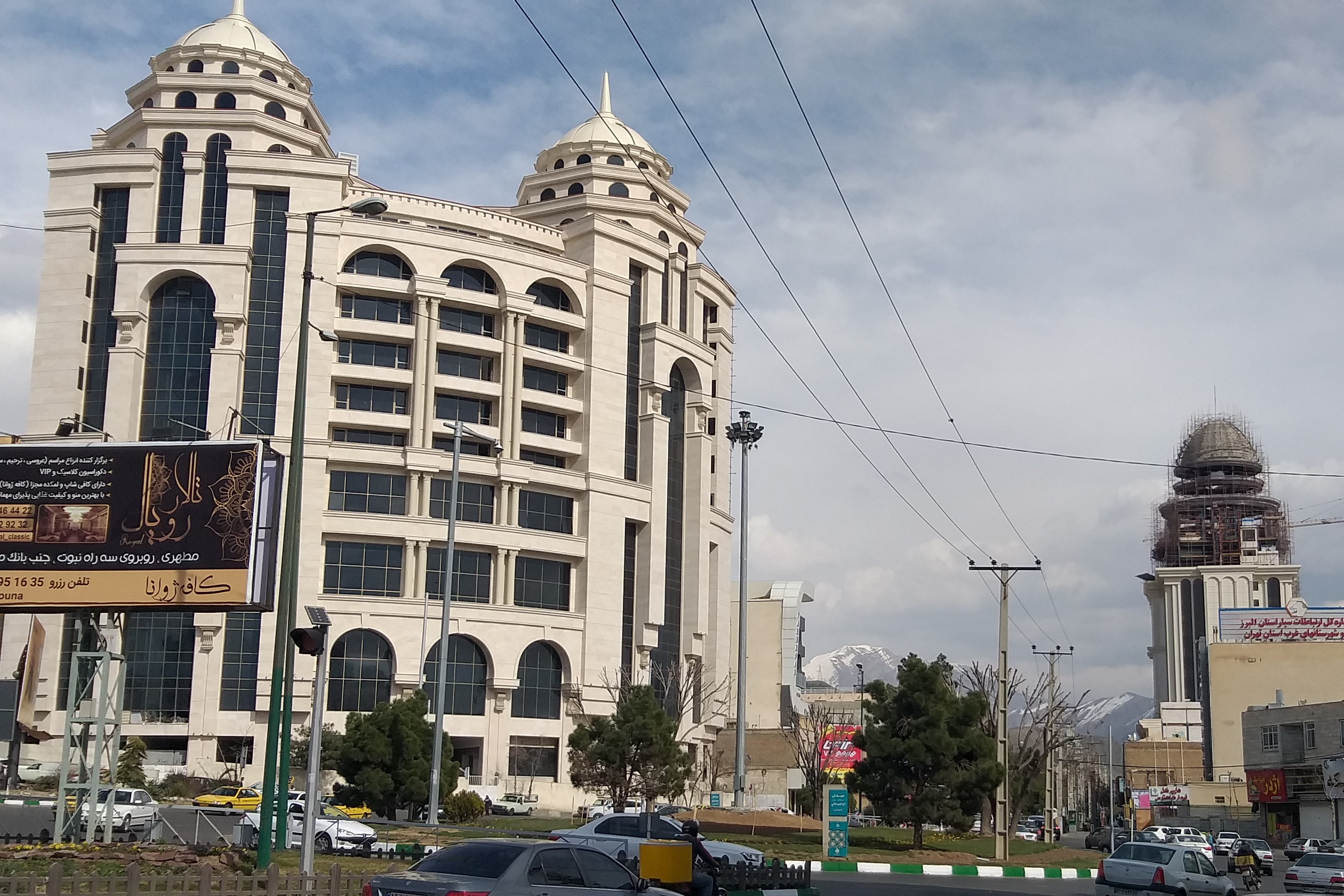
Azimiyeh Karaj

The downtown of Karaj is usually referred to Karaj Square, located hundred of meters to the west of Karaj River and the old Karaj Bridge. The villages Hesārak, Gowhar Dašt, and Šahrak e Azimie are located in the northern Greater Karaj.

Meškin Dašt, a large agricultural area between Mehršahr and Fardis, is near Karaj.

The following table includes the major districts of the city:

Gouhar Daŝt	Mehrŝahr	Kiānmehr	Karaj e Now	Hesārak	Deraxti	Azimiye	Ouj	Ŝāhin Villā	Bonyād	Bāqestān	Doulat Ābād
Garm Darre	Ŝahrake Jahānŝahr	Mesbāh	Mehr Villā	Dehqān Villā	Māhdaŝt	Ŝahrake Banafŝe	Fardis	Vahdat	Kalāk o Hesār	Estām Ābād	Golŝahr
Golŝahr Villā	Zibā Daŝt	Zoube Āhan	Sāsāni	Homāyun Villā	Mehrānŝahr	Mehdi Ābād	Ŝahrake Xātam	Miān Jādde	Heydar Ābād	Sāwoj Bolāq	Bahārestān

Open space recreational areas of Karaj include Irānzamin Park, Pārk e Xānvāde, Tennis Park, Pārk e Mādar, Tāleqān Gardens, Kordān Gardens, Jahānšahr Gardens, Pardis e Golhā, and the Tulip Garden of Gačsār.

=== Climate ===
The climate of Karaj is a bit cooler than Tehran's, and it receives 250 mm of rain annually (and like Tehran, the precipitation pattern is similar to those of Mediterranean climates). The Köppen-Geiger climate classification system classifies the city's climate as cold semi-arid (BSk).

Climate data for Karaj (1985–2010)
Month	Jan	Feb	Mar	Apr	May	Jun	Jul	Aug	Sep	Oct	Nov	Dec	Year
Record high °C (°F)	18.2 (64.8)	19.8 (67.6)	27.4 (81.3)	33.0 (91.4)	34.6 (94.3)	39.2 (102.6)	42.0 (107.6)	40.2 (104.4)	37.2 (99.0)	31.8 (89.2)	25.0 (77.0)	20.0 (68.0)	42.0 (107.6)
Mean daily maximum °C (°F)	6.1 (43.0)	9.0 (48.2)	14.2 (57.6)	20.7 (69.3)	26.2 (79.2)	32.6 (90.7)	35.2 (95.4)	34.5 (94.1)	30.4 (86.7)	23.5 (74.3)	15.1 (59.2)	8.9 (48.0)	21.4 (70.5)
Daily mean °C (°F)	1.8 (35.2)	4.1 (39.4)	8.7 (47.7)	14.5 (58.1)	19.2 (66.6)	24.6 (76.3)	27.1 (80.8)	26.8 (80.2)	22.9 (73.2)	17.1 (62.8)	9.9 (49.8)	4.6 (40.3)	15.1 (59.2)
Mean daily minimum °C (°F)	−2.5 (27.5)	−0.7 (30.7)	3.2 (37.8)	8.4 (47.1)	12.2 (54.0)	16.5 (61.7)	19.0 (66.2)	19.1 (66.4)	15.3 (59.5)	10.8 (51.4)	4.8 (40.6)	0.3 (32.5)	8.9 (48.0)
Record low °C (°F)	−19.0 (−2.2)	−15.6 (3.9)	−10.5 (13.1)	−3.5 (25.7)	−0.4 (31.3)	7.2 (45.0)	10.6 (51.1)	12.0 (53.6)	7.0 (44.6)	−0.5 (31.1)	−6.0 (21.2)	−14.6 (5.7)	−19.0 (−2.2)
Average precipitation mm (inches)	30.8 (1.21)	32.1 (1.26)	45.4 (1.79)	39.1 (1.54)	19.5 (0.77)	2.7 (0.11)	3.0 (0.12)	1.2 (0.05)	1.6 (0.06)	15.1 (0.59)	27.7 (1.09)	33.5 (1.32)	251.7 (9.91)
Average precipitation days (≥ 1.0 mm)	6.3	5.7	6.7	5.8	3.7	1.0	0.7	0.3	0.3	3.2	4.8	5.8	44.3
Average snowy days	5.4	3.7	1.9	0.1	0.0	0.0	0.0	0.0	0.0	0.0	0.5	2.7	14.3
Average relative humidity (%)	67	60	53	48	43	34	35	34	36	44	56	66	48
Mean monthly sunshine hours	166.3	169.7	197.4	218.1	280.7	335.2	341.5	340.1	304.2	250.1	187.2	156.8	2,947.3
Source: Iran Meteorological Organization (records), (temperatures), (precipitation), (humidity), (days with precipitation and snow), (sunshine)

Amir Kabir Dam and some other small lakes are based in Karaj. The city is a starting point for a drive along road forced north through the Alborz mountain to the Caspian Sea.

== Economy ==
The economic base of Karaj is its proximity to Tehran. It is due to the transportation of products between Tehran and the Caspian Sea. Chemicals, fertilizers and processed agricultural goods are also produced in the city.

Zowb Āhan, the avenue leading to an industrial plant, is located at the south of Ostandar Square. Zowb e Āhan or Zowb Āhan, literally "steel mill", was a contract between the Pahlavi government and a consortium from Nazi Germany. The establishment of the factory Zowb Āhan e Karaj was halted by the beginning of the Second World War, and it was never launched.

Šahrak-e Jahānšahr was the first modern private industrial and housing complex of Karaj, built in the 1960s. The factories Jahān Čit (textile factory), Rowqan Nabāti e Jahān (oil factory), and Čāy e Jahān (tea factory), were established at the complex. It is one of the largest industrial zones of the nation, with a 20% share of the national GDP.

The special economic zone of Payam, with an area about 3,600 ha (36 km^{2}; 8,900 acres) within the territory of Payam International Airport, was established in Karaj for development of air cargo and postal transportation, cold store, and packing services, as well as perishable and time sensitive exports. It is the only SEZ in the region with the privilege of its own airline.

=== Women's clothing ===
Small and medium women's clothing companies in Karaj produce all kinds of daily clothes and leather boots. Karaj was one of the few Iranian cities in the 2010s that controlled the damage to the environment in the process of producing women's clothing. Karaj women's over-the-knee boots are exported to the whole country and have a significant contribution to the city's economy.

== Transport ==
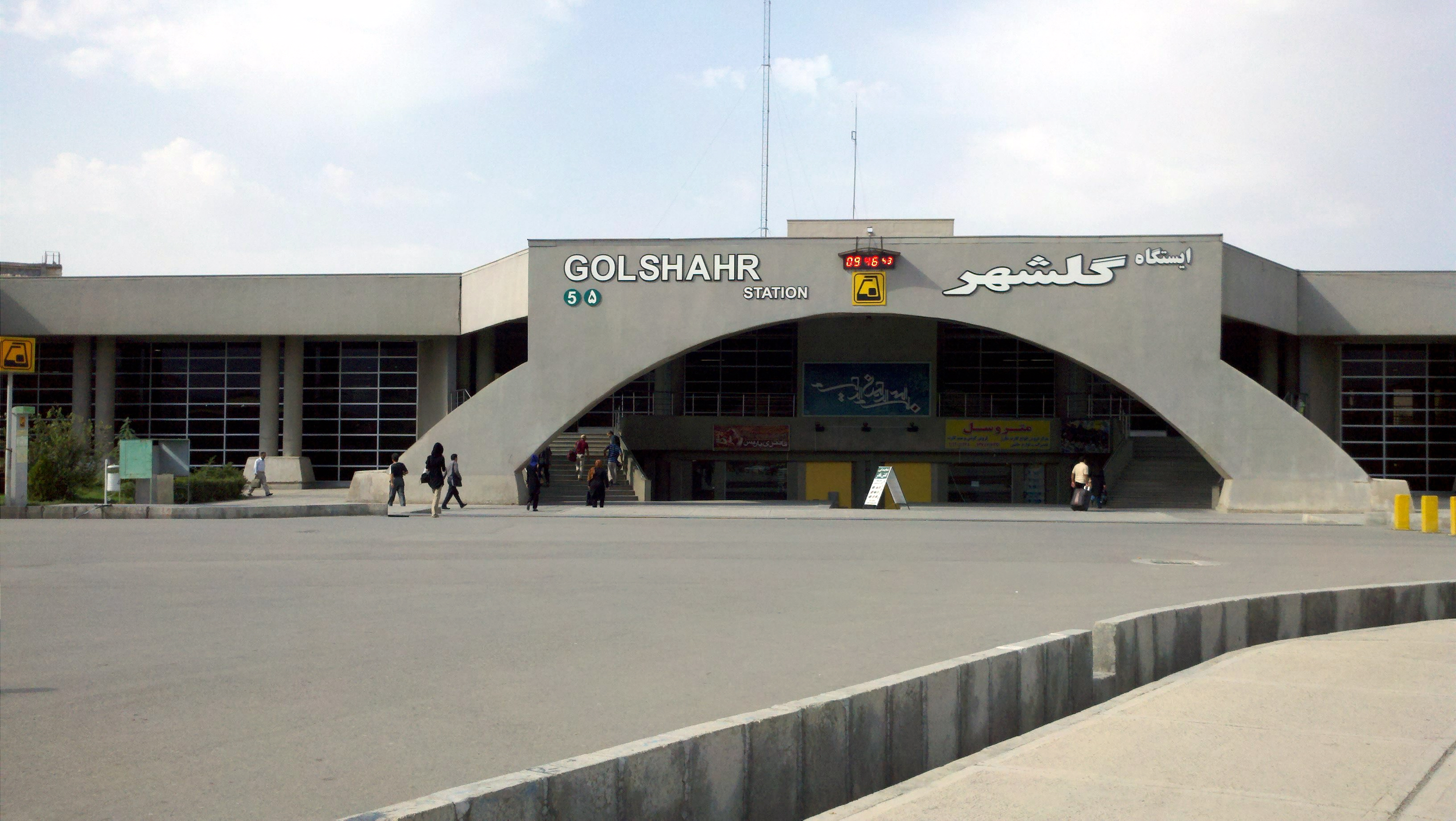
Golshahr Metro Station

=== Railway ===
Karaj is connected by railway and highways to Tehran 40 km east and Qazvin 100 km northwest, and by commuter rail to the subway system of Tehran.

=== Metro ===
The city is served by Karaj Metro with 2 lines and 10 stations. The Karaj urban railway organization was established on 21 December 2001.

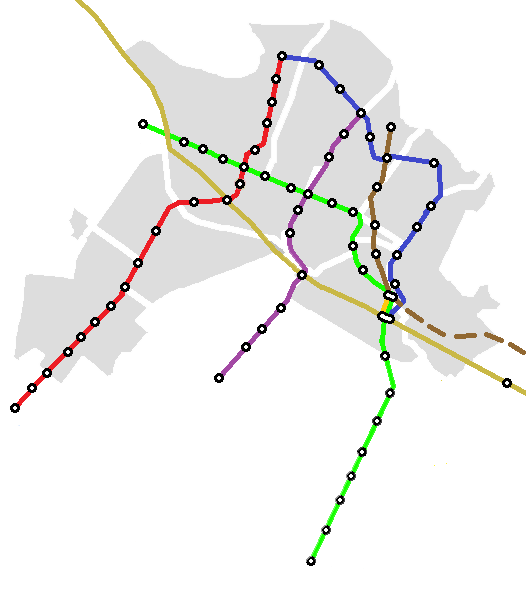
Karaj Metro operational and under construction lines

Karaj 6 lines information
Line	Line Route	Length	Stations
1	Germdareh – new city of Mehestan	43 km (26.7 mi)	7
2	Kamalshahr–Mallard	27 km (16 mi)	23
3	Karaj–Azimiyeh	14 km (9 mi)	12
4	Baghestan – Karaj (Payam) Airport	18 km (11.1 mi)	19
5	Shahid Moazen Boulevard – Mohamadshahr	12 km (7.5 mi)	10
6	Esteghlal Boulevard – Shahid Soltani Square	9 km (6 mi)	8
Total:		97 km (60 mi)	76

=== Road ===
The highway system of Karaj includes Tehran–Karaj Highway, Karaj Special Road, and the old road of Karaj (Fath Highway). Bākeri Expressway is one of the main north-to-south routes in west Tehran, which is connected to the Tehran–Karaj Highway. Tehran–Karaj Highway is one of the busiest sections in Iran with AADT of 217084. Karaj–Qazvin has an AADT of 79606.

The aerial transport of Karaj is served by the Payam International Airport, which was established in 1990, and was officially opened in 1997.

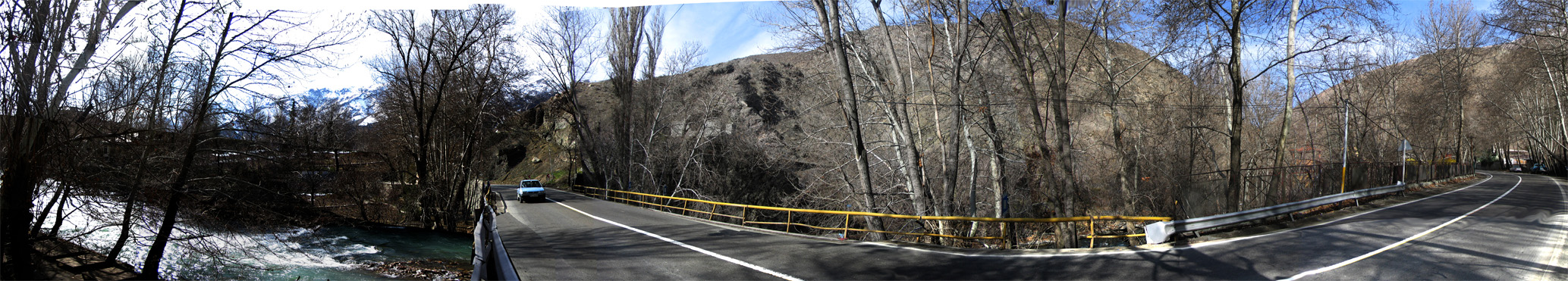
A view of the Karaj-Chalous Road (Road 59) and the Karaj River

=== Bus ===
Currently, the total number of buses in Karaj and the suburbs are 1,600 units. More than 80 lines serve citizens.

Preparing Alborz Card can reduce the cost of travel tickets.

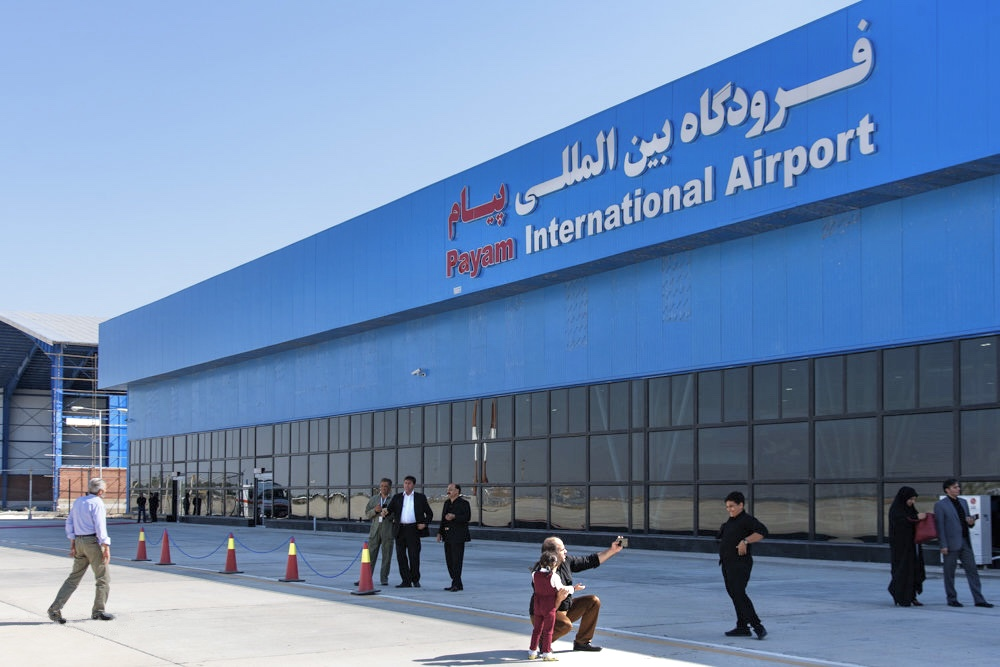
Payam Airport

=== Metro ===
The Karaj Metro consists of two lines. Line One travels from west to east through the city (from Karaj Station to Golshahr Station). It continues eastward to become Line Five of the Tehran Metro. On its way to Tehran, it stops at Chitgar park and Azadi stadium. The second line of Karaj metro (north to south) is under construction and opened for limited service in February 2023.

=== Air ===
Payam International Airport, is an international airport located in Karaj, 40 kilometers (25 mi) from Tehran, in the Alborz Province of Iran. The airport was established in 1990, but was not opened officially until 1997. Payam Aviation Services Co. operates the airport as part of Payam Special Economic Zone. Payam Air previously operated an airmail hub at the airport. Currently, this airport and its special area are used for purposes such as cargo transit, commercial transportation, and goods mail in the development of the country's communication and information technology industries.

== Sports ==
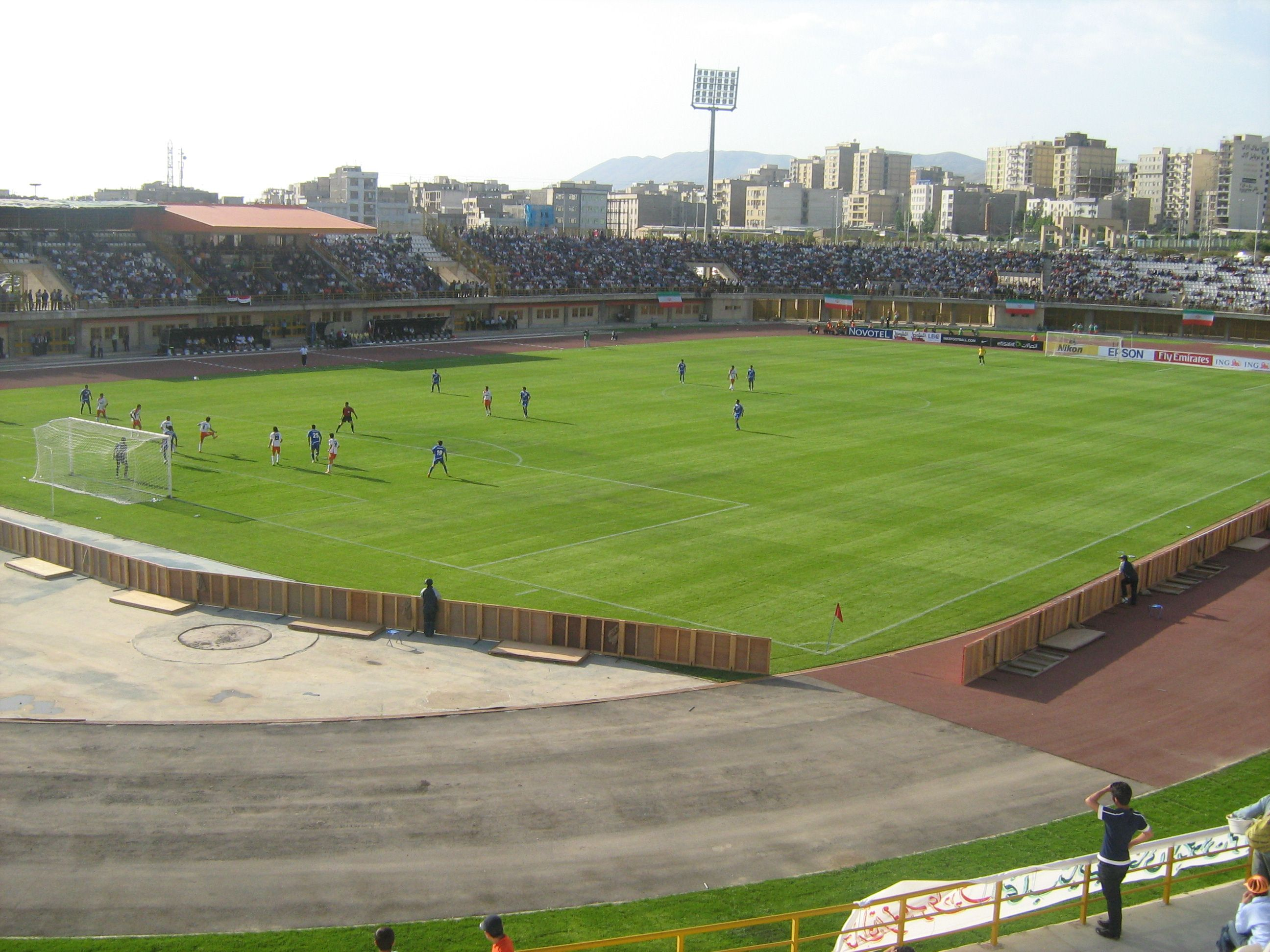
Karaj Enqhelab Stadium

Karaj was formerly home of the Persian Gulf Pro League club Saipa for several years, and this club won its first league championship in this city; in 2014 the team relocated to Tehran. Currently the only professional football team in city is Oxin Alborz that play in the Azadegan League. The Home stadium of Oxin Alborz F.C. is Enghelab Stadium that located in Karaj Enghelab sport complex and has a capacity of 15,000 people. The stadium held a match between Iran and Indonesia in June 2009. The stadium also held an international match, on May 1, 2012, where Iran's National Football team played Mozambique.

Saipa volleyball team lost to Kalleh in this stadium in 2011–12 and became the runner-up in the final match of the country's volleyball premier league. Saipa has won the runner-up title of Iran Super League seven times.

One of the international ski resorts of Iran The, Dizin ski resort, is located a few kilometers north-east of the city, in the Alborz. In Dizin, along with skiing facilities, there are tennis courtyards, a slope for skiing on turf, some altitudes for mountain climbing and walking as well as riding and some routes for cycling. Karaj also has an international tennis complex which is used to training and tournaments. Jahanshahr International Tennis Complex is located in Bagh Fateh. This park has eight practice courts and one competition court with a capacity of 1,200 people. It is the only tennis complex in Iran that has covered courts.

== Education ==
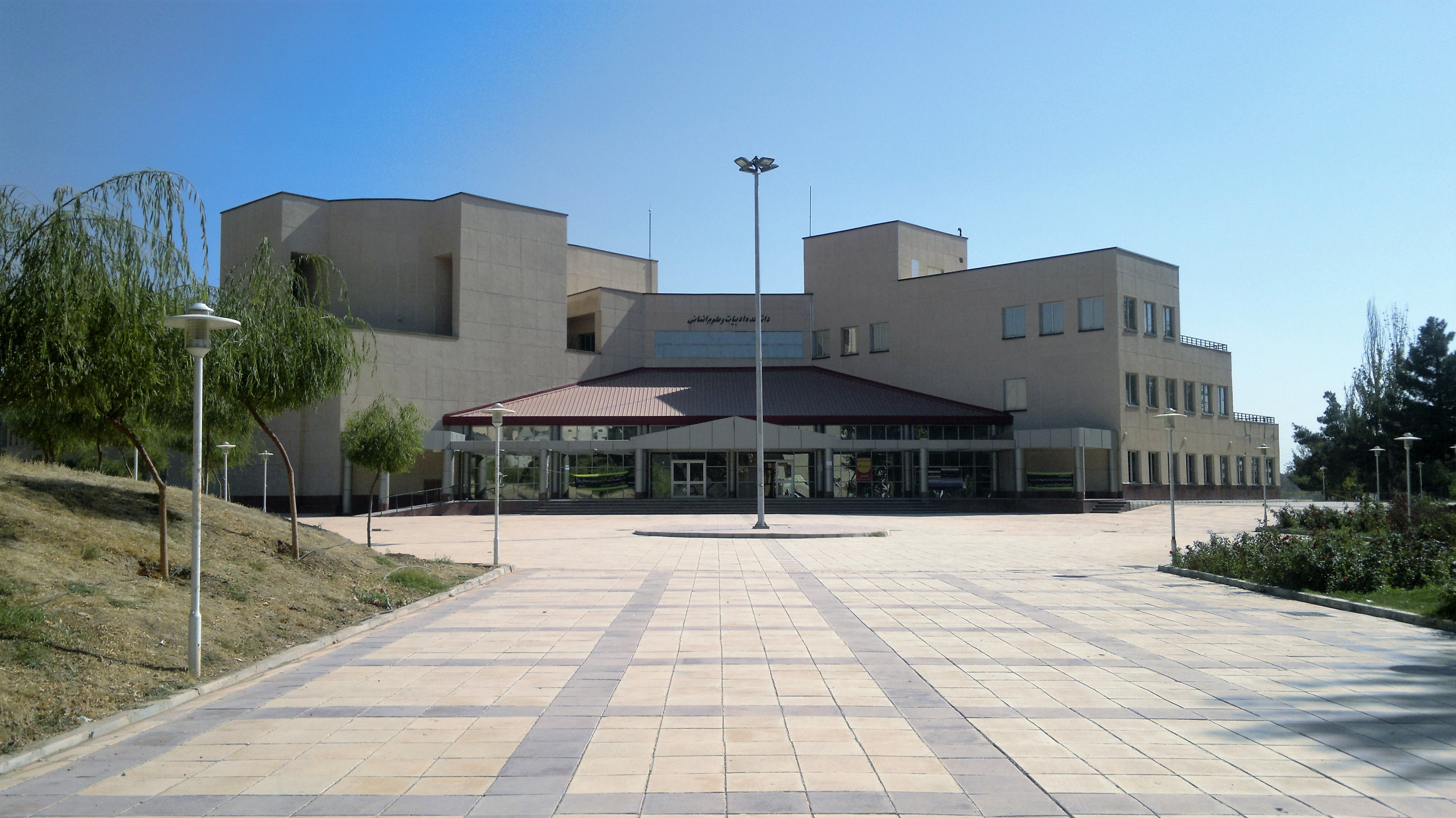
Kharazmi University (Karaj Campus)

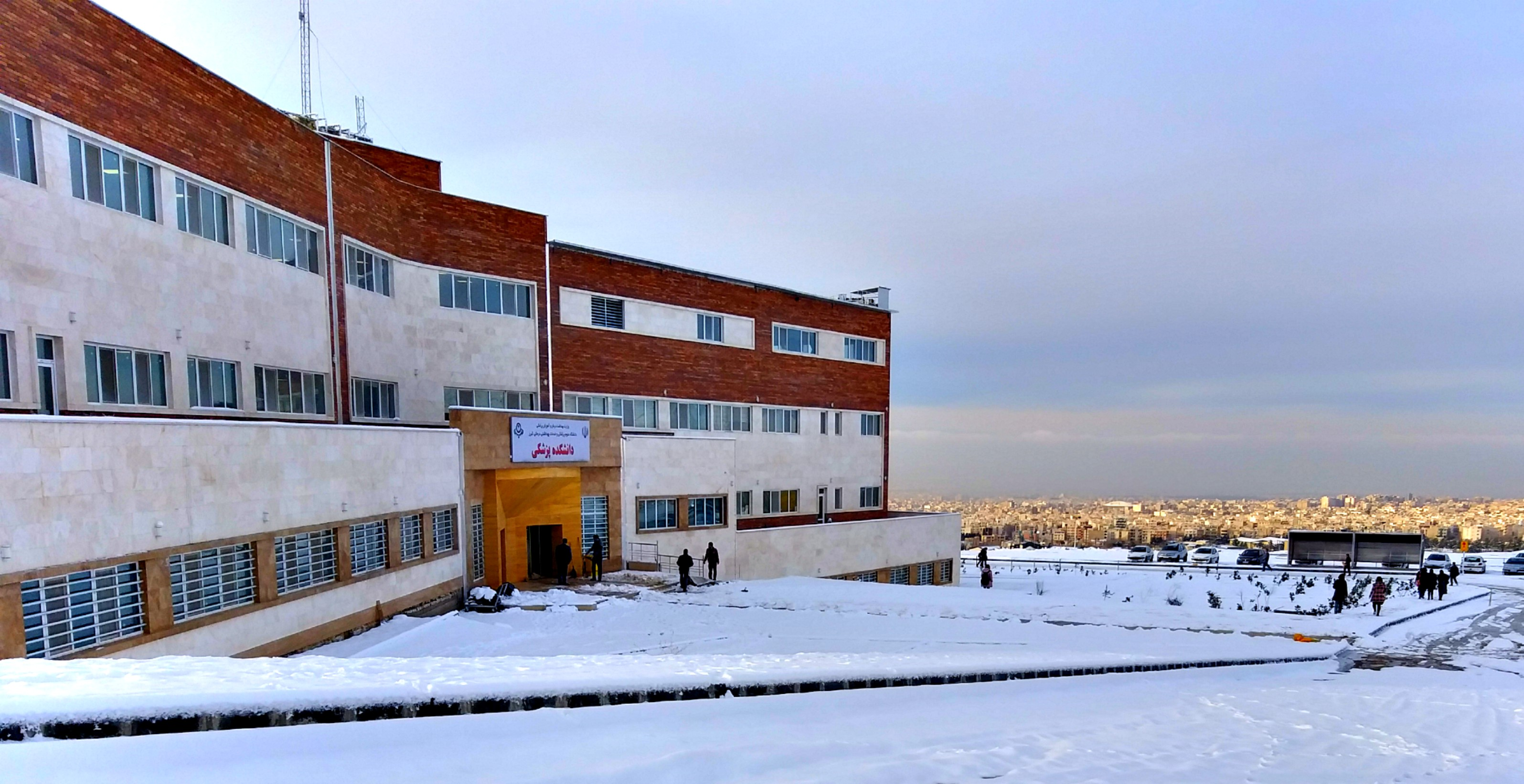
Alborz University of Medical Sciences, Faculty of medicine

Educational and research centers of the city include:

- University of Tehran (Agriculture and Natural Resources College)
- Kharazmi University (Karaj Campus)
- Iran University of Art (Karaj Campus)
- Payame Noor University (Karaj Center)
- National University of Skill (Alborz Province)
- University of Applied Science and Technology (Alborz Province)
- Farhangian University (Alborz Province)
- Alborz University of Medical Sciences
- Islamic Azad University, Karaj Branch
- Razi Vaccine and Serum Research Institute
- Agricultural Research, Education and Extension Organization
- Materials and Energy Research Center
- Standard Research Institute
- Nuclear Science and Technology Research Institute (Center of Agriculture and Nuclear Medicine)

== Notable people ==
=== Academia and scholars ===
- Saied Reza Ameli (b. 1961), a scholar of communication
- Abū Bakr Muḥammad ibn al Ḥasan al-Karajī (Persian: ابو بکر محمد بن الحسن الکرجی; c. 953 – c. 1029) was a 10th-century Persian mathematician and engineer who flourished at Baghdad

=== Actors ===
- Mehran Rajabi (b. 1962), actor
- Mehraneh Mahin Torabi (b. 1957), actress

=== Politicians and political activists ===
- Armita Abbasi (born 2001), protester, arrested and assaulted
- Shadi Amin (b. 1964), political activist, researcher
- Fatemeh Ajorlou (b. 1966), politician
- Mahmoud Bahmani (b. 1947), politician
- Mohammad Reza Pourshajari (1963? – 2021), blogger, political prisoner

=== Writers ===
- Hossein Sanapour (b. 1960), writer
- Saeed Kamali Dehghan (b. 1985), journalist

=== Athletes ===
- Ali Kiaei (b. 1987), futsal player
- Milad Farahani (b. 1988), football player
- Afshin Kazemi (b. 1986), futsal player
- Ahmad Sanjari (b. 1960), football coach
- Alireza Heidari (b. 1976), Olympic wrestler
- Mehdi Mahdavi (b. 1984), volleyball player
- Mojtaba Taghavi (b. 1968), football player
- Leila Esfandyari (1970–2011), mountain climber
- Ali Mohammadi (b. 1984), wrestler
- Ebrahim Sadeghi (b. 1979), football player
- Ebrahim Masoudi (b. 1982), futsal player
- Reza Mohammadi (b. 1986), football player
- Amin Manouchehri (b. 1986), football player
- Rouhollah Dadashi (1982–2011), powerlifter
- Mohammad Nosrati (b. 1981), football player
- Navid Abdolmaleki (b. 1990), mixed martial artist
- Farshad Falahatzadeh (b. 1967), football player
- Behnaz Shafiei (b. 1989), racing driver and motorcycle racer

== See also ==
- Mehršahr
- Amir Kabir Dam
- Morvārid Palace

Media related to Karaj at Wikimedia Commons

Karaj travel guide from Wikivoyage
