= John deKoven Hill =

American architect (1920–1996)

- Born: May 19, 1920; Cleveland, Ohio, U.S.
- Died: June 25, 1996 (aged 76); Madison, Wisconsin, U.S.
- Other names: Johny Hill, Johnnie Hill

John deKoven Hill (1920–1996) was an American architect, honorary chairman of the Frank Lloyd Wright Foundation, and editorial director of House Beautiful magazine.

== Biography ==
Hill decided to become an architect early on in his life, but not until he visited Taliesin did he become passionate about the design style of Frank Lloyd Wright. Hill skipped his high school graduation ceremony to enroll in the Taliesin Fellowship program on June 17, 1938. Because Hill was so young even among the apprentices, Wright often introduced him not by his name but by "This is Johnny. His father left him on my doorstep in a basket." With only a high school education, Hill started very green as an apprentice but went on to become Wright's chief architect and right-hand man. Hill had a keen sense of balance and an eye for design, and took responsibility for the designs and furnishings of all the interiors of the buildings Wright designed.

Hill and Wright designed a number of buildings together where Hill acted as chief architect. From 1953 to 1963 Hill served as the architecture editor for House Beautiful magazine and in 1964 became its editorial director. In this function, Hill helped promote the cause of Modern architecture and particularly Wright's "Organic" approach. He went on to become treasurer of the Taliesin Fellowship and honorary chairman of the Frank Lloyd Wright Foundation.

He was the chief designer for the J. Ralph & Patricia B. Corbett House (1959–1960) in Cincinnati, Ohio. In the 1970s, Hill worked alongside Cornelia Brierly to design the interiors and furniture for the Pearl Palace in Mehrshahr, Iran.

Hill died June 25, 1996, in Madison, Wisconsin. He had worked with the Wright Fellowship until his death.
