= Mehrshahr =

Neighborhood in Karaj, Iran

Coordinates: 35.8008°N 50.9053°E

Mehrshahr (Persian: مهرشهر) is an affluent area located south-west of Karaj city in Alborz province, Iran.

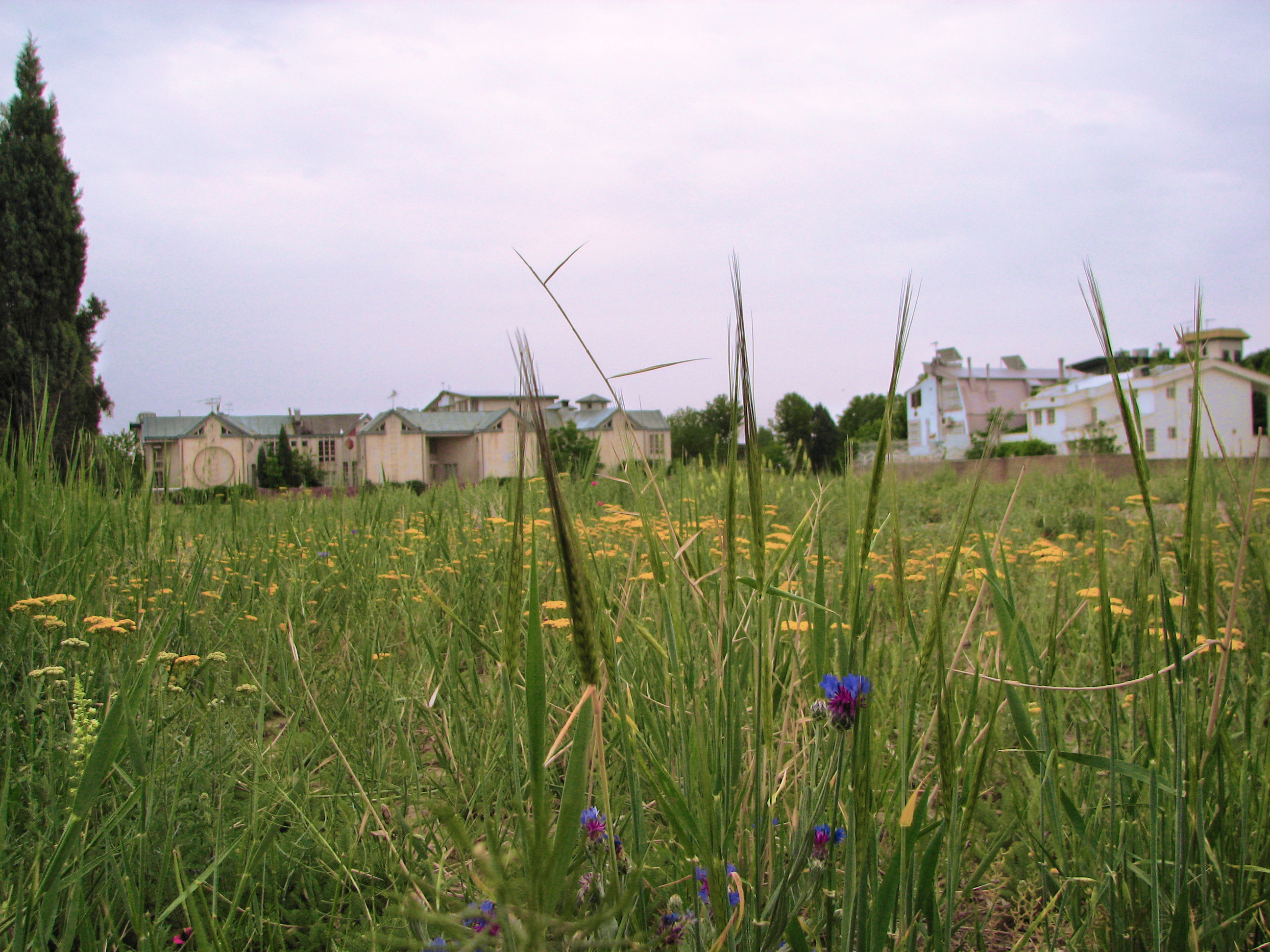
Mehrshahr in the spring

Mehrshahr in the winter

== History ==
In the 1960s, the area was mostly made up of large apple orchards which were designed and built by Ali Saroukhani and owned by the members of the Pahlavi dynasty. They built the Pearl Palace (Persian: kakh-e Morvarid), and a small set of scattered large villas. The area was not open to the public. After a decade the number of these houses increased and the area was reshaped into a town. The area was designed by Taliesin Associated Architects (Frank Lloyd Wright Foundation).

Since 1979, when the Pahlavi family left Iran after the Islamic Revolution, the area has been opened for public residency and has become more populated. The old areas are now recognized as Phases One, Two, and Three, which are around the Shahrdari Boulevard. The Pearl Palace is placed in phase 3. Many other new towns like Kianmehr, as well as Phase Four and Phase Five, have also been built around this area.
