= Jafar Qoli Khan Qajar =

18th-century Iranian prince and commander

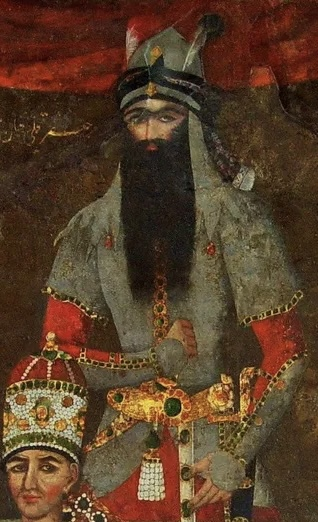
- Jafar Qoli Khan by Abdallah Khan featured in Soleymaniyeh Palace, Karaj.
- Born: 1752; Astarabad, Zand Iran
- Died: 1791 (aged 39); Tehran, Qajar Iran
- Spouses: Nabat Khanum (until 1791) Zohreh (until 1791)
- Issue: No issues
- Persian: جعفرقلی خان قاجار
- House: Qajar
- Father: Mohammad Hasan Khan Qajar
- Mother: Mrs. Ezzeddinlou Qajar
- Commander of the Qajar army
- Cause of death: Assassination
- Allegiance: Qajar dynasty
- Service years: 1779–1788
- Rank: General
- Military activities: Establishing the Qajar dynasty; Conquests: 1781 Mazandaran; 1782 Gilan; 1782 Qazvin; 1782 Zanjan; Conflicts: 1784 Rostam Khan Zand; Security establishment: 1786–1788 Isfahan

Jafar Qoli Khan Qajar (Persian: جعفرقلی خان قاجار; born 1752 in Gorgan, Zand Iran; died 1791 in Tehran, Qajar Iran) was an Iranian prince of the Qajar dynasty, and a half-brother of Agha Mohammad Khan Qajar, the founder of Qajar dynasty. He served as a commander of the Qajar army and substantially contributed in establishing the Qajar dynasty and expanding and securing its territories. He became the governor of Bastam and Shahrud in 1782 and the chief of security forces in Isfahan from 1786 to 1788. He was killed by the order of Agha Mohammad Khan on the assumption that he would disrupt the succession of the throne and weaken the future of the dynasty.

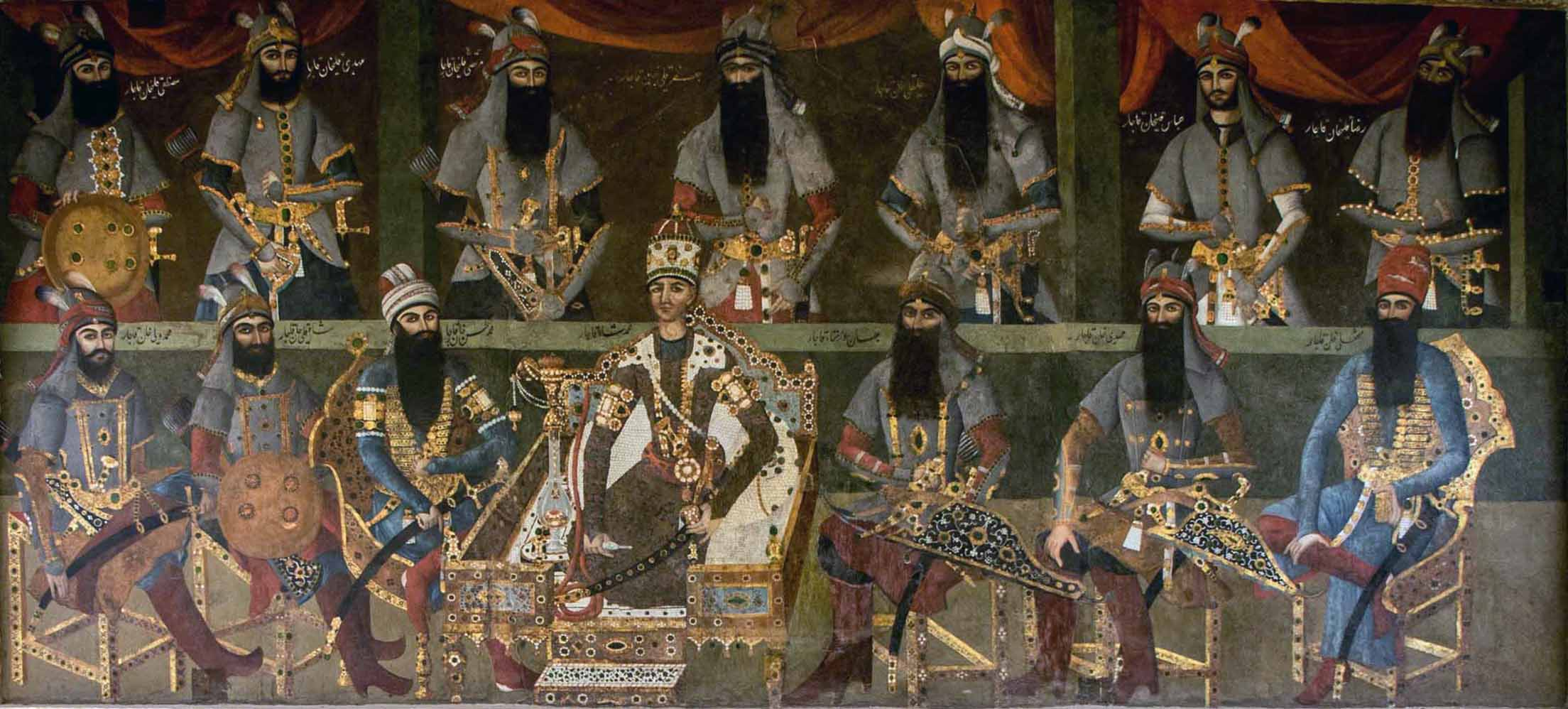
Agha Mohammad Khan Qajar and Family members; Jafar Qoli Khan is depicted at the top middle.

== Early life ==
In 1752, Jafar Qoli was born in Astarabad (now, Gorgan), Zand Iran in the Qoyunlu branch of the Qajar family. His father was Mohammad Hasan Khan Qajar who had nine sons and two daughters from various wives. Jafar Qoli's mother was of the Ezzeddinlou Qajar family from the Ashaqeh-Bash tribe, i.e., the same family as Fath-Ali Shah Qajar's mother.

His childhood fell in the early years of the Zand dynasty and a period of their rivalry with the Qajar dynasty. His father, Mohammad Hasan Khan, made considerable advances by gaining territories and even striking gold coins by 1757 to commemorate his achievements, but while preparing to combat Karim Khan Zand, he was killed in 1759, i.e., when Jafar Qoli was seven years old. Afterwards, Karim Khan went to Astarabad, took control of the Qajar treasure, and captured Mohammad Hasan Khan's children. Jafar Qoli was among the children who were sent to Qazvin and placed under confinement in a family property. He was treated humanely by the Zands even though they were rivals with the Qajars. Later, he was allowed to join his eldest half-brother, Agha Mohammad Khan Qajar, in Shiraz.

== Hostage in Shiraz ==
Following the death of his father in 1759 and being held in confinement in Qazvin for a while, Jafar Qoli was sent to Shiraz and joined his half-brother Agha Mohammad Khan. They were held hostage in Shiraz by Karim Khan until 1779, i.e., when Karim Khan died.

== Tehran ==
In 1779, following the death of on Karim Khan, Jafar Qoli and Agha Mohammad Khan escaped their confinement in Shiraz and moved toward Tehran. They arrived in Tehran on 10 March 1779.

== Service to the Qajar Dynasty ==
Jafar Qoli Khan was one of the bravest and most competent military commanders of the Qovanlu Qajar family. He played a key role in uniting the two rival tribes of Qovanlu and Devellu by arranging meetings between Agha Mohammad Khan, who was the head of the former tribe, and the latter tribe.

After 1779, Jafar Qoli Khan was appointed as the military commander of the Qajar army by Agha Mohammad Khan and assigned to conquer Mazandaran which just became under control of Morteza Qoli Khan Qajar, Agha Mohammad Khan's half-brother. By 1781, Jafar Qoli Khan defeated his half-brother Morteza Qoli Khan and conquered Mazandaran.

In 1782, Jafar Qoli Khan was appointed as the governor of Bastam and Shahrud by the order of Agha Mohammad Khan. Subsecuently, he was tasked to command the army in conquering Gilan. With Jafar Qoli Khan's help, Agha Mohammad Khan conquered Gilan and secured its treasure. With this victory and fund, he sent Jafar Qoli Khan to conquer Khamseh (Zanjan). Jafar Qoli Khan defeated the Zand force near Ray or Karaj, took control of Qazvin, and captured Zanjan.

In 1784, Jafar Qoli Khan defeated a Zand army under the command of Rostam Khan Zand, a cousin of Ali-Morad Khan Zand and the ruler of Zand dynasty, who was missioned to move northward.

In 1786, Agha Mohammad Khan was in control of Isfahan and Tehran, while Jafar Khan Zand, the ruler of the Zand dynasty, was in control of Shiraz. Jafar Khan Zand attacked Isfahan and shortly brought it under his control, but failed to keep it and fled once he became aware of Agha Mohammad Khan's march toward Isfahan. Following the rather easy reconquest of Isfahan, Agha Mohammad Khan appointed Jafar Qoli Khan as its chief of security forces, also known as beglarbeigi, and further supported him by dedicated strong troops. Jafar Qoli Khan held the position until 1788.

== Death ==
In 1791, Jafar Qoli Khan was killed in Tehran at the age of 39 by the order of his half-brother Agha Mohammad Khan. Despite being a great supporter of Agha Mohammad Khan in his achievements, Jafar Qoli Khan was assumed to become the head of Qajar dynasty after Agha Mohammad Khan instead of the more favored candidate, Fath-Ali Khan. Having seen the rivalry in the Zand family and how it disintegrated the Zand dynasty, Agha Mohammad Khan viewed this difficult decision as a necessity for the future success of the Qajar dynasty.

== Marriage and children ==
Jafar Qoli Khan married Nabat Khanum and Zohreh. However, no children is recorded for Jafar Qoli Khan by the historians contemporary to him.

=== First marriage (Nabat Khanum (died 1842); no children) ===
Jafar Qoli Khan married Nabat Khanum who was a Jew from Darolmarz Mazandaran (a region that now includes Gorgan, Mazandaran, and Gilan). She was sweet and beautiful. At age seven, she was tutored by Jafar Qoli Khan. Their marriage date is unknown, but it lasted until Jafar Qoli Khan's murder, i.e., until 1791.

After that, Nabat Khanum settled in Agha Mohammad Khan's harem for while. Then, she married Fath-Ali Shah Qajar by the order of Agha Mohammad Khan. They divorced after her two infant children died. Her last marriage was with Mirza Shafi Mazandarani which lasted until his death in 1819. She died in Tehran in 1842.

=== Second marriage (Zohreh; no children) ===
Jafar Qoli Khan also married Zohreh, also known as Ostad Zohreh, who was a musician from Isfahan. A while after Jafar Qoli Khan's death in 1791, she settled in Fath-Ali Shah's harem but did not marry him.

== Sources ==
- Azodi, Ahmad Mirza Azdo-Dowleh (1887). تاریخ عضدی [Azodi History] (in Persian). Maharat.
- Bamdad, Mehdi (1978). شرح حال رجال ایران در قرن ۱۲ و ۱۳ و ۱۴ هجری [Biographies of Iranian Elites in 17-20th Centuries] (in Persian). Zavvar.
- Hambly, Gavin R.G (1991). "Agha Muhammad Khan and the establishment of the Qajar dynasty". The Cambridge History of Iran, Vol. 7: From Nadir Shah to the Islamic Republic. Cambridge: Cambridge University Press. ISBN 9780521200950.
- Khavari, Mirza Fazlollah Shirazi (1845). Tarikh Zol Qarnein (تاریخ ذوالقرنین) (in Persian). Ministry of Culture and Islamic Guidance of Iran.
