= George Hadley (orientalist) =

English army officer of the East India Company and orientalist

George Hadley (died 1798) was an English army officer of the East India Company, now known as an orientalist for his early work on Hindustani.

== Life ==
Hadley was appointed a cadet in the East India Company's service in 1763, and gained his first commission in the Bengal Presidency on 19 June of that year. He became lieutenant on 5 February 1764, and captain on 26 July 1760.

Hadley retired from the service on 4 December 1771. He returned to England, though it is not known exactly when. He was of assistance to the self-taught orientalist William Price, whom he introduced to William Ouseley.

Hadley died on 10 September 1798 in Gloucester Street, Queen Square, London.

== Works ==
As an army commander, Hadley was in charge of a company of sepoys, but initially had no knowledge of their language, Hindustani, which was then colloquially known in English as "Moors". For his own use, Hadley wrote a grammar of it, in 1765. A copy of his manuscript was published in London in 1770. Hadley then worked on a corrected edition, which appeared as Grammatical Remarks (1772). He published also Introductory Grammatical Remarks on the Persian Language. With a Vocabulary, English and Persian, Bath, 1776.

Hadley's grammar was aimed at the current British needs in Bengal, to get Indians to work for them, without the mediation of a munshi. Its content, as a phrase book, reflected the economy and social climate of the time, and ignored the Urdu language. Hadley correctly identified Hindustani as a language in its own right, rather than a dialect of Persian. His theory of a Tartar origin was rejected, and his work came in for criticism from John Borthwick Gilchrist, who objected to the version of Hindustani it reported.

In 1788 Thomas Briggs, a printer in Hull, persuaded Hadley to put his name to a compilation, A New and Complete History of the Town and County of the Town of Kingston-upon-Hull.

== Notes ==
Attribution

This article incorporates text from a publication now in the public domain: Stephen, Leslie; Lee, Sidney, eds. (1890). "Hadley, George (d.1798)". Dictionary of National Biography. Vol. 23. London: Smith, Elder & Co.
