= Abdallah Khan =

Iranian court painter and architect 1770–1850

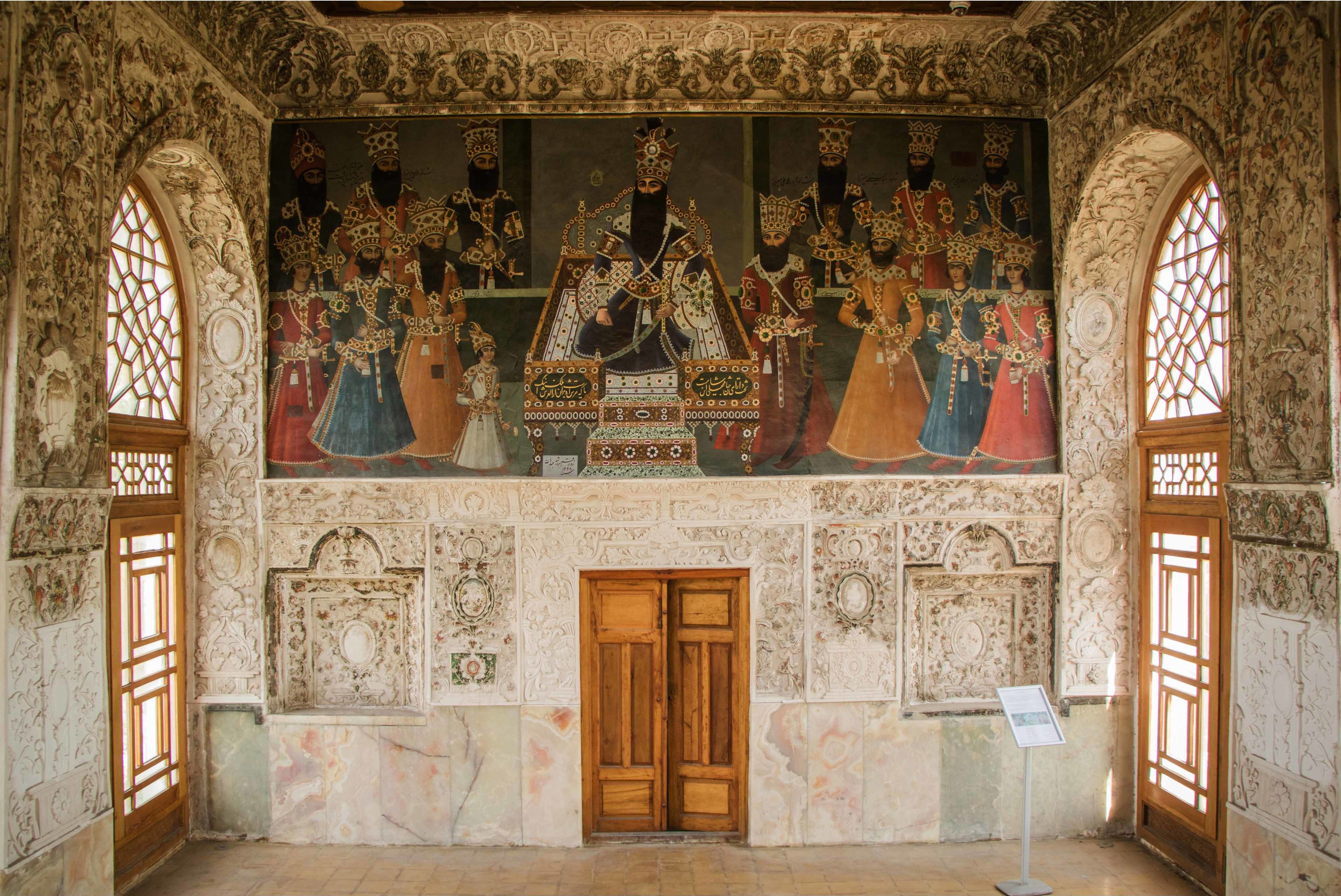
- Mural by Abdallah Khan in the Soleymaniyeh Palace in Karaj, depicting Fath-Ali Shah Qajar and his court. Dated 1813–14
- Born: c. 1770
- Died: c. 1850
- Known for: Painting, architecture

Abdallah Khan (Persian: عبدالله‌خان; c. 1770 – c. 1850) was an Iranian court painter and architect of the Qajar era who was active between 1810 and 1850. His greatest work is a grand mural in the Negarestan Palace, Tehran, and he is also known to have painted murals at the Soleymaniyeh Palace in Karaj.

== Background ==
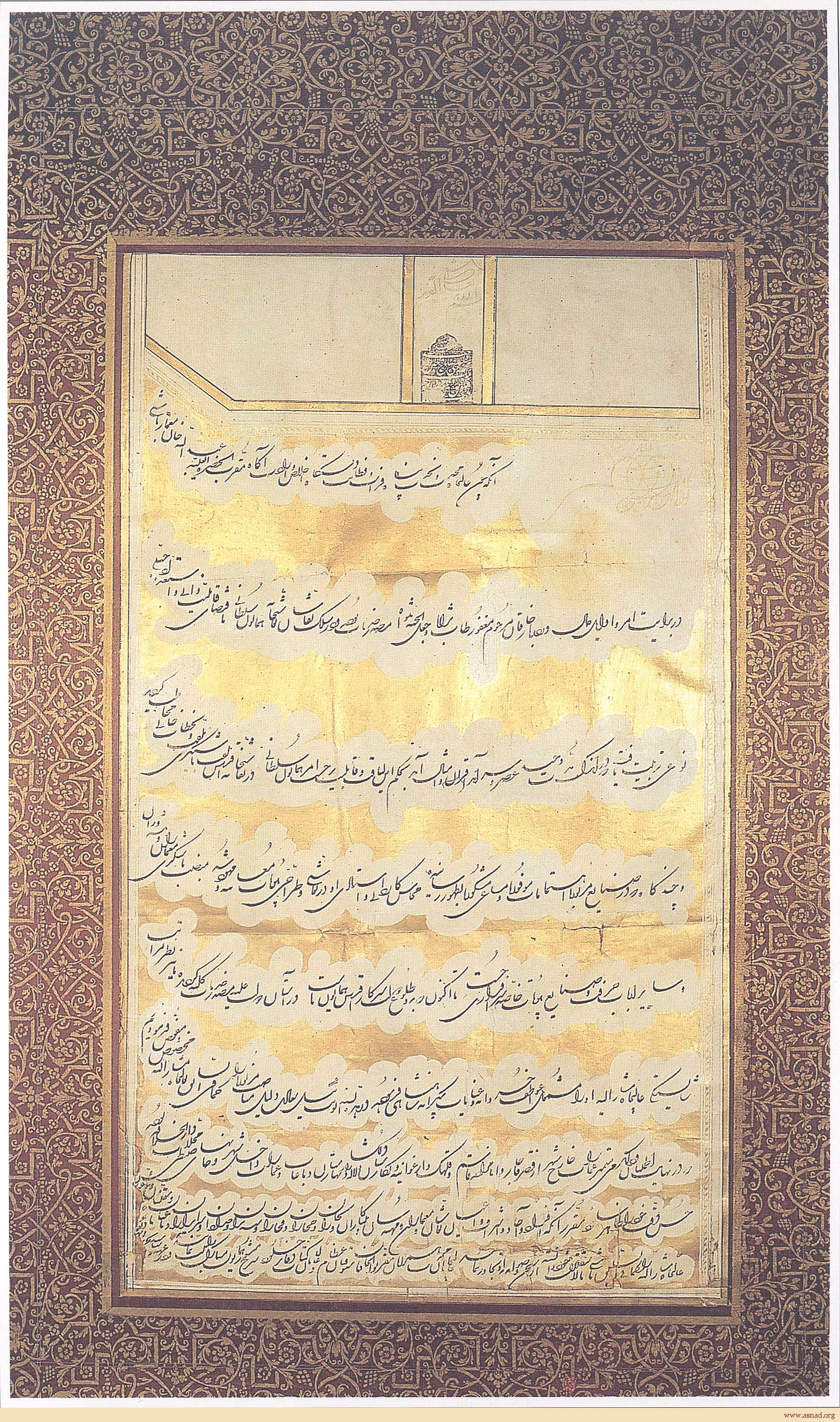
Farman by Mohammad Shah Qajar; the Shah grants Abdallah the title of "Khan" and appoints him naqqash bashi and me'mar bashi, order on the construction of the royal palace

Abdallah Khan was born in c. 1770 and received his apprenticeship in the royal workshops, working in a group of artists (naqqashan-e naqqashkhane-ye homayun). In 1839, the Qajar shah Mohammad Shah (r. 1834–1848) appointed him as painter laureate (naqqāsh bāshī), court architect (me῾mār bāshī), and supervisor of the royal workshops. Following his appointment, all of the groups working in the royal workshops, such as the painters (naqqashan), architects (me'maran), engineers (mohandisan), enamelers (minakaran), carpenters (najjaran), lapidaries/sculptors (hajjaran), potters (fakhkharan), glass-cutters (shishe-baran), smiths (haddadan), janitors (saraydaran), gardeners (baghbanan), canal diggers (moqanniyan) and candle makers (shamme'an), reported to Abdallah Khan as their supervisor.

Abdallah Khan was part of the first generation of Qajar-era painters, which also included Mirza Baba, Mihr 'Ali, and Mohammad Hasan Khan. In Tehran in 1812, Abdallah Khan met with English orientalist William Price, a member of the Gore Ouseley mission to Iran. During the meeting, Abdallah Khan introduced Price to his work. Khan died in c. 1850, during the early years of Naser al-Din Shah Qajar's reign (1848–1896). Not much is known about Abdallah Khan's personal life.

== Negarestan Palace mural ==
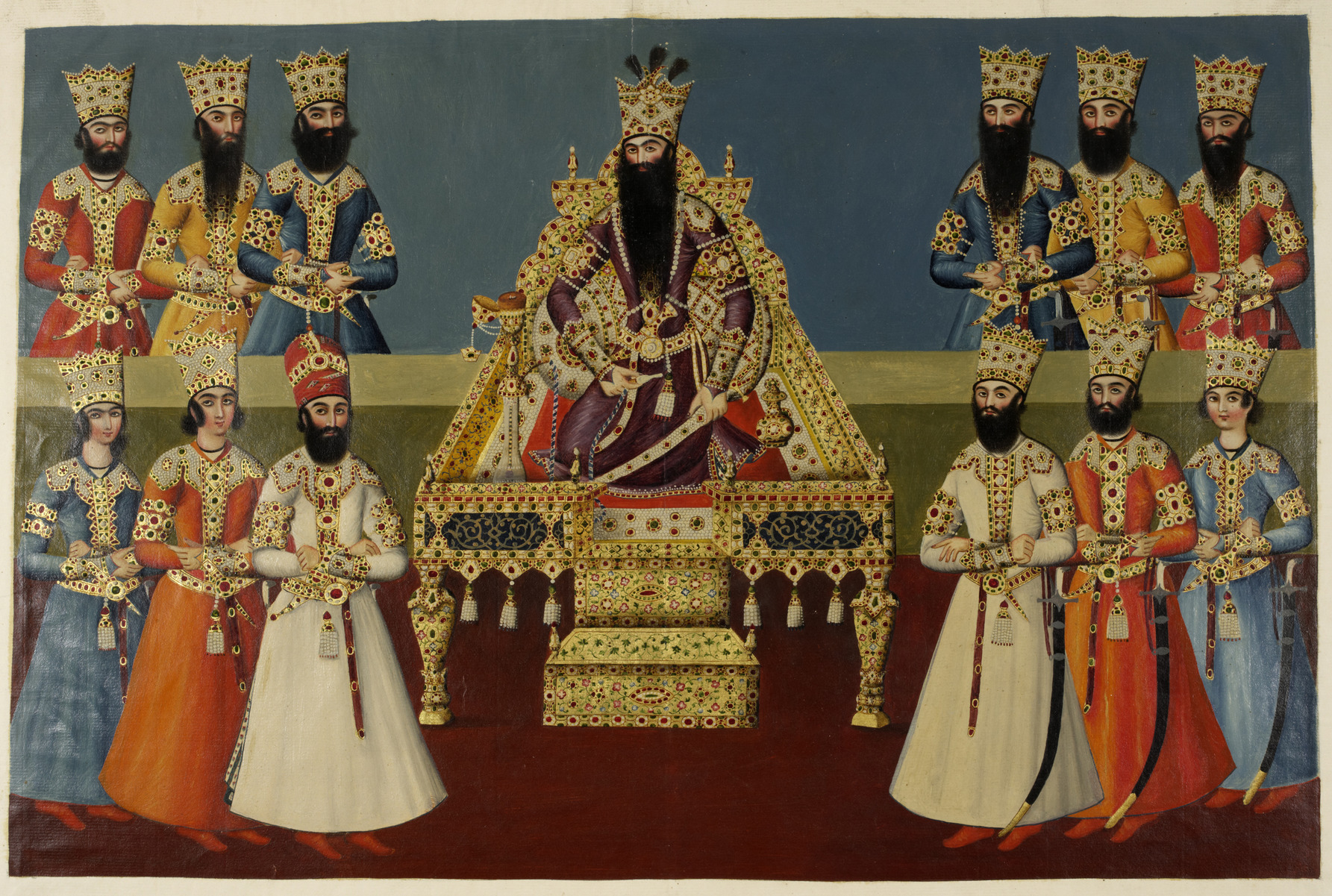
Image from a reduced copy of the Negarestan Palace mural showing Fath-Ali Shah enthroned with his sons, attended by gholams. Created in 1816–1820

Abdallah Khan's best-known work is a mural covering three internal walls of the audience hall at Negarestan Palace, Tehran. The work depicts 118 life-size figures. The end wall depicts an enthroned Fath-Ali Shah Qajar (r. 1797–1834), the Shah of Iran, who is attended by twelve of his sons and six gholams. The gholams are depicted wielding the royal shield and carrying other items. On the side walls, two strings of courtiers, foreign envoys, and guards are shown. Some of the foreigners shown are, on one side, Britishers John Malcolm, Harford Jones (later Harford Jones-Brydges), and Gore Ouseley. On the other side are the Frenchmen General Gardane, Pierre Amédée Jaubert, and Joseph Jouannin.

In the late 1880s, British orientalist Edward Granville Browne used the inscription below the mural to attribute it to Abdallah Khan, and dated it to 1812–1813. Most 19th-century travelers in Iran, including George Curzon and Philip Walter Schultz, however, incorrectly attributed it to Mohammad Hasan Khan. The original work was later lost but a full-scale replica was made in 1904 during the reign of Mozaffar ad-Din Shah Qajar (r. 1896–1907), and is currently stored in the Persian Foreign Office. Several reduced (small-scale) replicas were also made for European diplomats and visitors. One of these was engraved in London in 1834 by Robert Havell.

== Soleymaniyeh Palace mural ==
In 1813–1814, shortly after completing the Negarestan Palace mural, Abdallah Khan completed other murals in Soleymaniyeh Palace, which now houses the National School of Agriculture, in Karaj. These depict the courts of Agha Mohammad Khan Qajar (r. 1789–1797) and Fath-Ali Shah Qajar. A few fragments of this mural have been maintained in the library of the National School of Agriculture.

== Other works ==
Abdallah Khan is also known for being adept in enamel and oil painting. He painted several full-length portraits of Fath-Ali Shah Qajar, including one that is in the possession of the Victoria and Albert Museum and depicts him wearing a red robe and a bejeweled Astrakhan cap. Abdallah Khan was also the imperial designer of Fath-Ali Shah's marble cenotaph in Qom. Abdallah Khan's relationship with two of his former colleagues Mirza Baba (who also held the title of naqqāsh bāshī) and Mihr 'Ali remains unclear; where they also worked in other media, such as lacquer and enamel, Abdallah Khan seems to have confined himself to oil painting.
