= Zohreh (Iranian musician) =

19th-century female Iranian singer

- Ostad Zohreh
- Born: 18th century Isfahan, Zand Iran
- Died: 19th century Tehran, Qajar Iran
- Spouse: Jafar Qoli Khan Qajar
- Persian: استاد زهره
- Dynasty: Qajar (by marriage)
- Occupation: Musician

Zohreh (Persian: زهره; born 18th century; died 19th century), also known as Ostad Zohreh (Persian: استاد زهره; lit. 'Zohreh, the professional' or 'Professor Zohreh') was a musician in the royal court of Fath-Ali Shah Qajar (r. 1797–1834). She was a wife of Jafar Qoli Khan Qajar, one of the Shah's uncles.

== Early life ==
She was born in Isfahan, Zand Iran in the 18th century.

== Music ==
Zohreh was a student of Rostam Yahudi Shirazi, who was a distinguished musician in his era. She played music instruments such as Kamancheh, Setar, and Tar.

== Fath-Ali Shah's court ==
Zohreh was a musician in the court of Fath-Ali Shah Qajar (r. 1797–1834). She played Kamancheh, Setar, and Tar in her own unique style. Even though she was not a consort of the Shah, he brought her to his harem, paid her a salary, and provided her with all the necessary means of luxury. Zohreh, together with her musician colleague Mina, was appointed to lead upward of fifty actors, singers, dancers, and the players of the music instruments such as Tar, Setar, Kamancheh, Santur, and Metronome.

== Marriage ==
Zohreh married Jafar Qoli Khan Qajar (1752–1791), who was an uncle of Fath-Ali Shah, a half-brother of Agha Mohammad Khan Qajar (r. 1789–1797), and one the bravest and most competent military commanders of the Qovanlu Qajar family. This marriage, however, was not Jafar Qoli Khan's first, as his first wife was Nabat Khanum. In 1791, Jafar Qoli Khan was killed by the order of Agha Mohammad Khan in Tehran.

== Sources ==
- Azodi, Ahmad Mirza Azdo-Dowleh (1887). تاریخ عضدی [Azodi History] (in Persian). Maharat.
- Bamdad, Mehdi (1978). شرح حال رجال ایران در قرن ۱۲ و ۱۳ و ۱۴ هجری [Biographies of Iranian Elites in 17-20th Centuries] (in Persian). Zavvar.
- Khavari, Mirza Fazlollah Shirazi (1845). Tarikh Zol Qarnein (تاریخ ذوالقرنین) (in Persian). Ministry of Culture and Islamic Guidance of Iran.
