= Naser al-Din Shah's slide =

Water slide

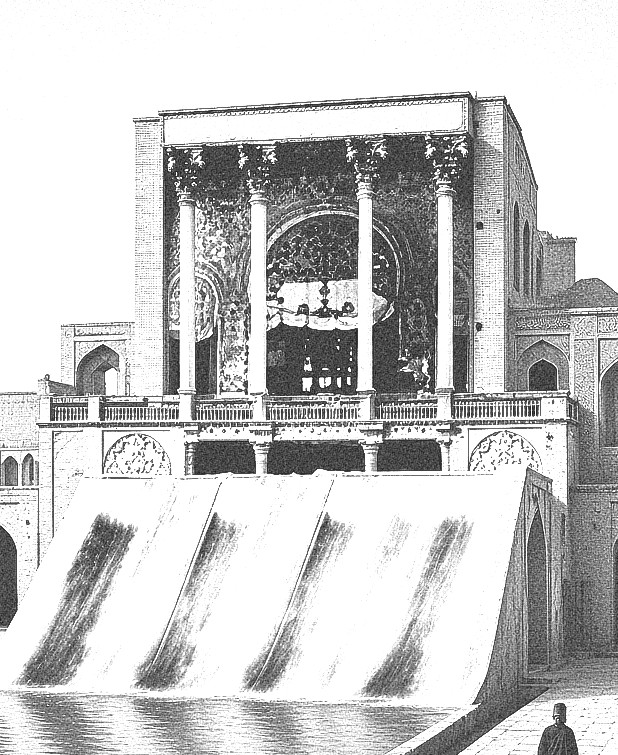
Naser al-Din Shah's slide in 1871

Naser al-Din Shah's slide (Persian: سرسره ناصرالدین شاه) was a slide in the subterranean baths of the Negarestan Palace in Tehran, Qajar Iran. The Encyclopædia Iranica notes that Western visitors commented on "the royal palace of Negārestān and salacious reports about its slide used for erotic purposes". The slide was destroyed by Reza Shah Pahlavi after he overthrew the Qajar dynasty.

== Association with Fath-Ali Shah Qajar ==
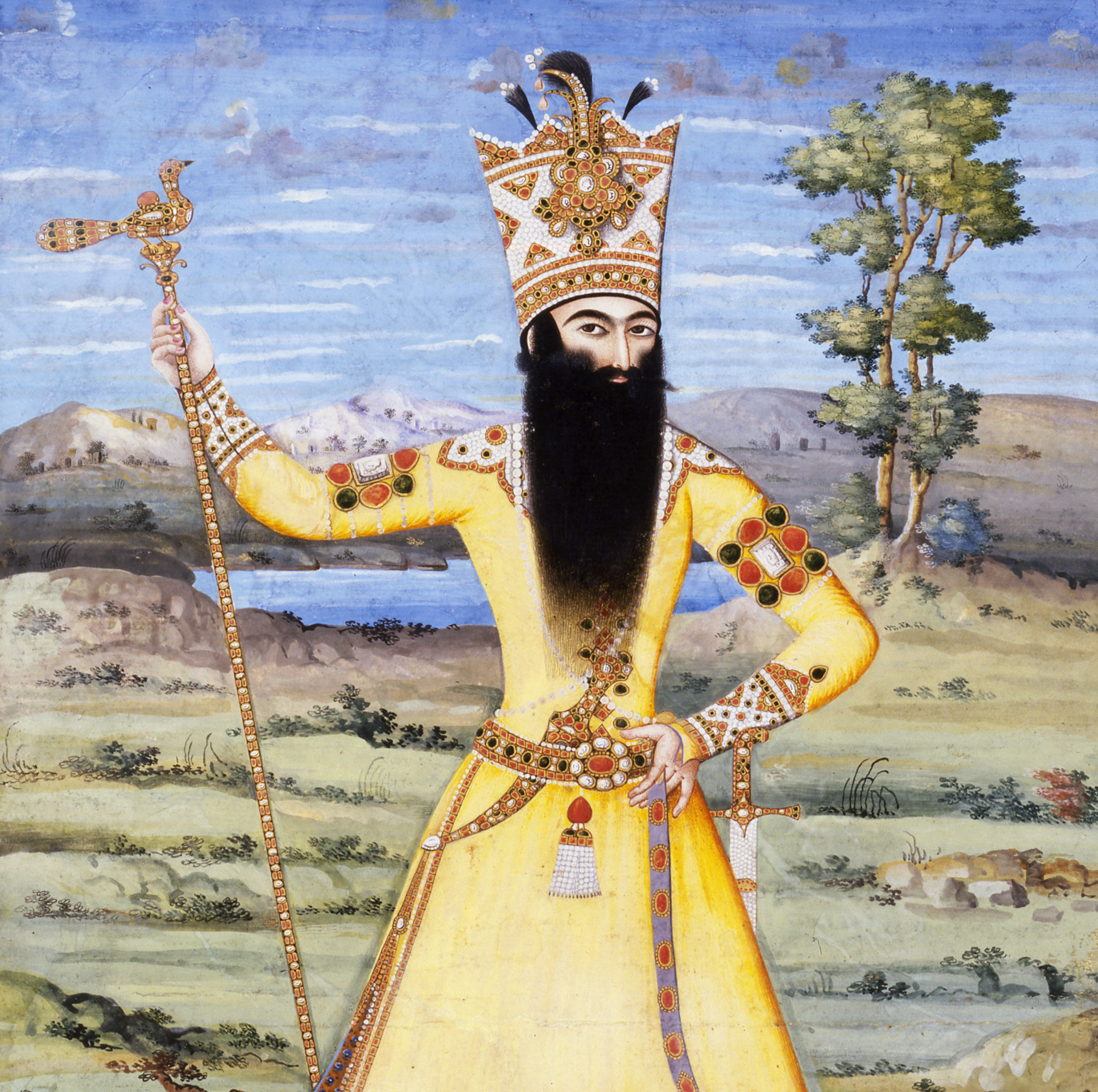
Fath-Ali Shah, creator of the marble slide, who is supposed to have felt the need to use it every day

John H. Waller, commenting on Qajar art, mentions that such a slide was used by Fath-Ali Shah Qajar and his harem:

Beyond range of the artists' canvases were even jollier scenes; Fath Ali Shah, it was said, happily whiled away the hours as, one by one, naked harem beauties swooped down a slide, especially made for the sport, into the arms of their lord and master before being playfully dunked in a pool.

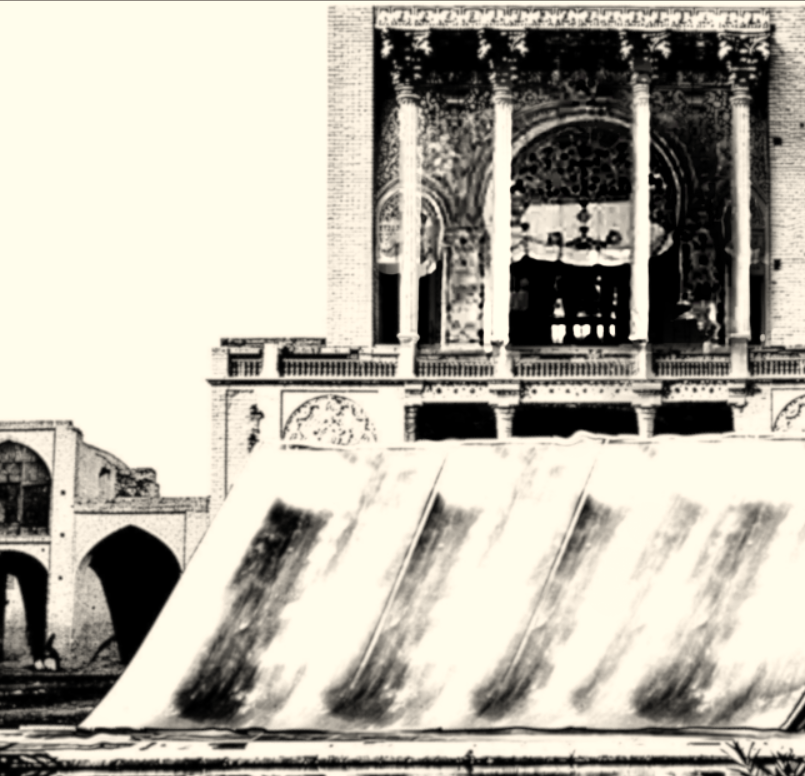
A slide in one of the courtyards of the Negarestan Palace, 1860

The slide was described by Edward Granville Brown in his account of Negaristan Palace in Tehran:

a beautiful marble bath [is] furnished with a long smooth glissoire, called by the Persians sursurak ("the slide"), which descends from above to the very edge of the bath. Down this slope the numerous ladies of Fath-'Ali Shah's harem used to slide into the arms of their lord, who was waiting below to receive them.

The story circulated that the Shah lay on his back awaiting each of his many concubines. Ervand Abrahamian writes that according to legend, "Fath'ali did so every day naked so that his wives would slide down naked over him."

== Association with Naser al-Din Shah ==
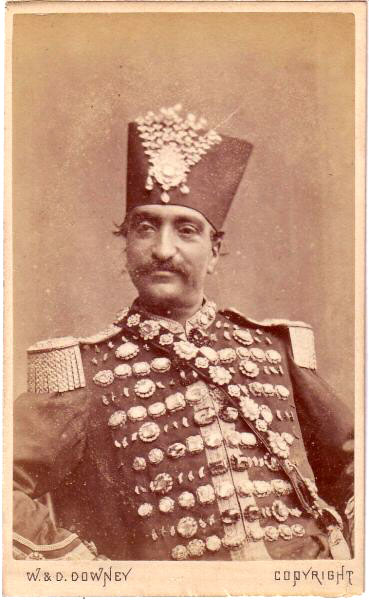
Naser al-Din, the Shah who is most popularly associated with the slide

There is also no evidence that such a slide was used by the other shahs of the dynasty. Nonetheless, this type of slide has come to be known in Iran as "Naser al-Din Shah's slide" after Naser al-Din Shah Qajar, Fat′h-Ali Shah's great grandson. This may be because he reconstructed the Negarestan palace, where the most famous such slide was located. Fred A. Reed says that the "late nineteenth-century Qajar tyrant" had "returned from Paris so enchanted with classical ballet that he dressed the women in his harem in short-skirted ballet costumes, then made them descend a long slide to his private quarters, the better to admire their frilled underwear." R. Jackson Armstrong-Ingram already documented the impossibility of this 'ballet costume story' by pointing out that the short skirt was already in fashion at the court of the shah before his European journeys and by pointing out that the 'tutu' did not yet exist at the time of the shah's visits to European theatres in 1873.

Another version of the story is given by Harry De Windt in his 1891 book A Ride to India Across Persia and Baluchistan, also associating a pool slide with Naser al-Din Shah. De Wint says that the slide was alabaster and that the Shah invented a sport in which he would "gravely slide into the water followed by his seraglio. The sight must have been a strange one, the costumes on those occasions, to say the least of it: scanty!"

== In culture ==
The adventure novelist Richard Henry Savage includes it in his novel Lost Countess Falka, in which the Shah, "a cold-eyed, sensual autocrat", indulges himself at the harems where "the glowing naiads were sporting on the marble slide which led their tempting nakedness into the perfumed crystal waters!".

Naser al-Din Shah and the slide have been portrayed in film. In Once Upon a Time, Cinema (1992: original Persian title: Nasseroddin Shah Actor-e Cinema), Golnar, the feisty heroine of classic Iranian movie Lor Girl (1932) is magically transported to the reign of Naser al-Din Shah, who falls in love with her and forces her to join his harem. She escapes after being sent down a slide leading from the women's quarters to a hall in the palace. In Beate Petersen's animated docudrama Nasseredin Shah and his 84 wives (2011) the king is depicted in animated silhouette receiving an endless line of (fully clothed) wives down a slide, while real decisions about the kingdom are made by others. This film won Petersen Best Documentary Director at the Noor Iranian Film Festival.

== Notes ==
External videos
- Nasseredin Shah and his 84 wives film (in Persian)
