= Soleymaniyeh Palace =

Palace in Karaj, Iran

- کاخ سلیمانیه
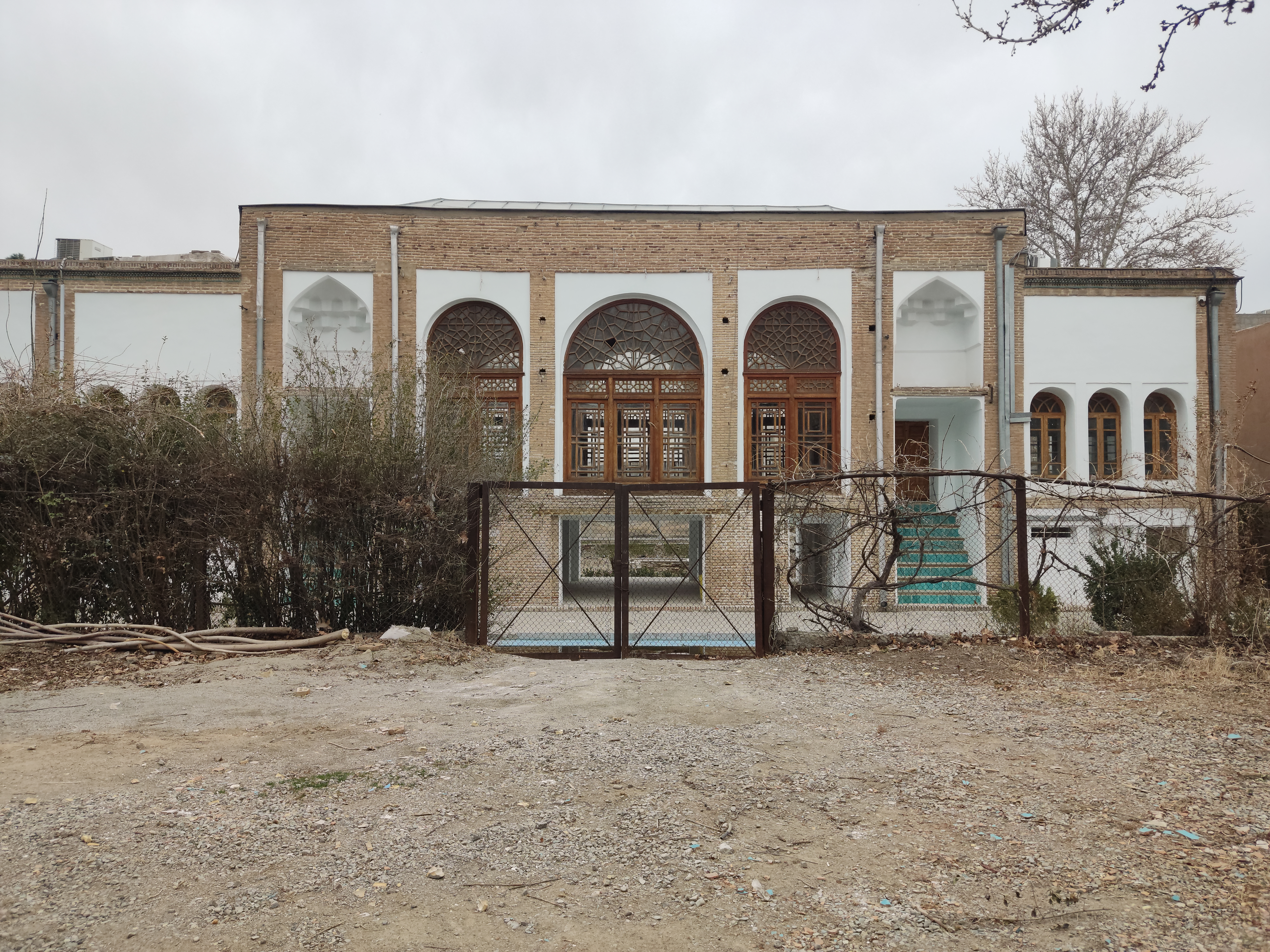
- Northern facade, 2024

General information
- Type: Royal residence
- Architectural style: Qajar architecture

Iran National Heritage List
- Official name: Soleymaniyeh Palace
- Type: Palace
- Designated: 1949
- Reference no.: 370
- Conservation organization: Cultural Heritage, Handicrafts and Tourism Organization of Iran
- Location: Karaj, Iran
- Inaugurated: 1811–1812

Design and construction
- Architect: Hajji Mohammad Hossein Isfahani

The Soleymaniyeh Palace (Persian: کاخ سلیمانیه, romanized: Kākh-e Soleymaniyeh) is a Qajar era royal residence in Karaj, Iran. It is notable for its paintings depicting Agha Mohammad Khan Qajar's brothers and Fath-Ali Shah Qajar and his sons.

== History ==
The palace, designed by the architect Hajji Mohammad Hossein Isfahani, was constructed by the order of Fath-Ali Shah in a large garden near the Karaj river.

There are two stories regarding the name of the building. The more probable one states that the palace was built on the occasion of the birth of the Shah's 34th son, named Soleiman Mirza. Soleiman Miza is shown as a child near the throne in one of the paintings. However, Gaspard Drouville, a Frenchman who was in Iran at the time, reports that a son of Fath-Ali Shah, Mohammad-Ali Mirza Dowlatshah, was unhappy of Abbas Mirza's designation as the crown prince, and to prove his worth engaged in warfare with the Ottoman governor of Iraq, Suleiman Pasha, defeated him and took a hefty loot. He then sent the loot to the capital, and the Shah built the palace with that money and named it Soleymaniyeh to forever commemorate the victory over the Ottomans.

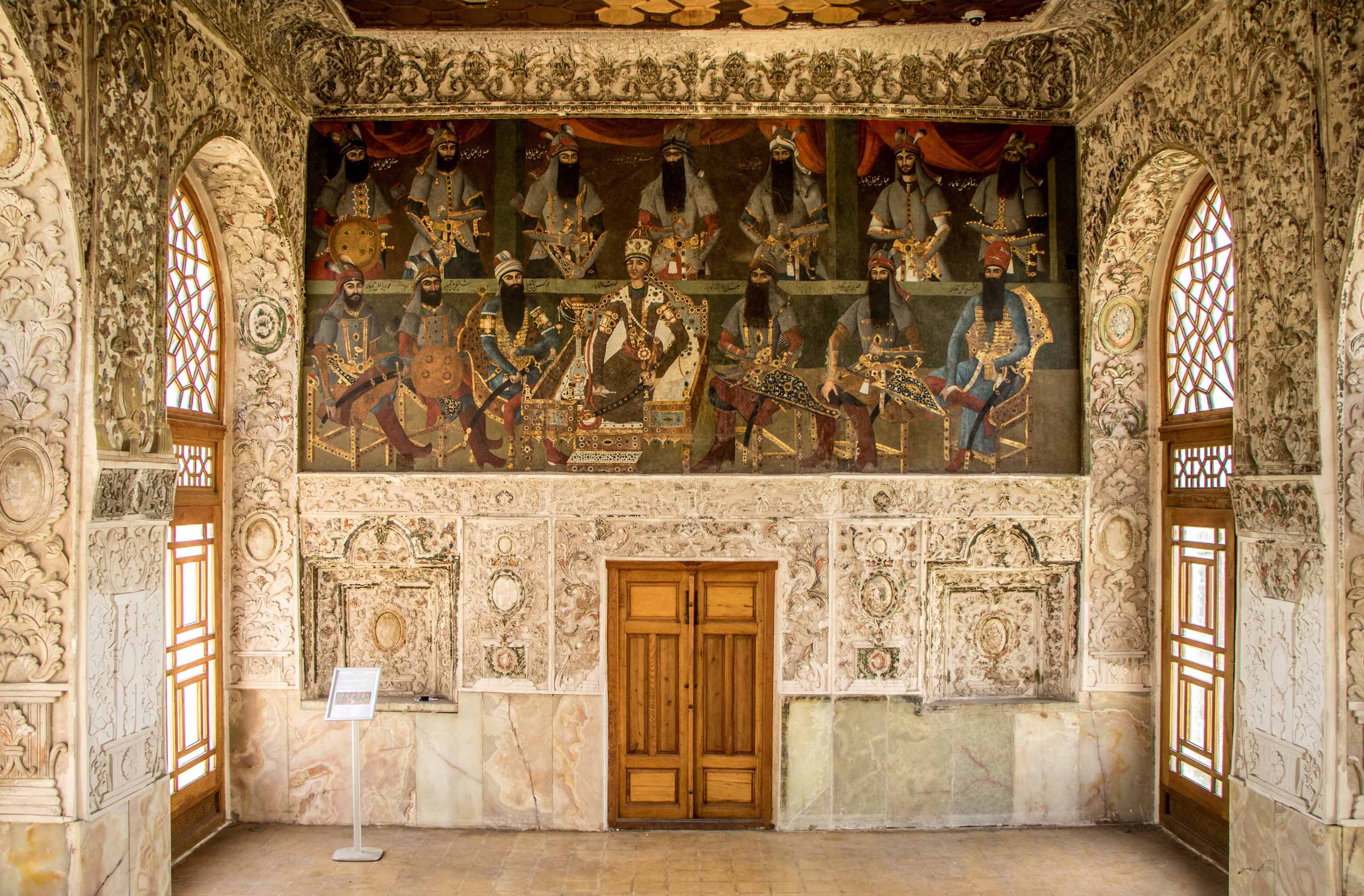
Painting of Agha Mohammad Khan with his brothers

There are two paintings by Abdallah Khan in the building, one showing the brothers of Agha Mohammad Khan Qajar, and the other showing Fath-Ali Shah Qajar and his courtiers.

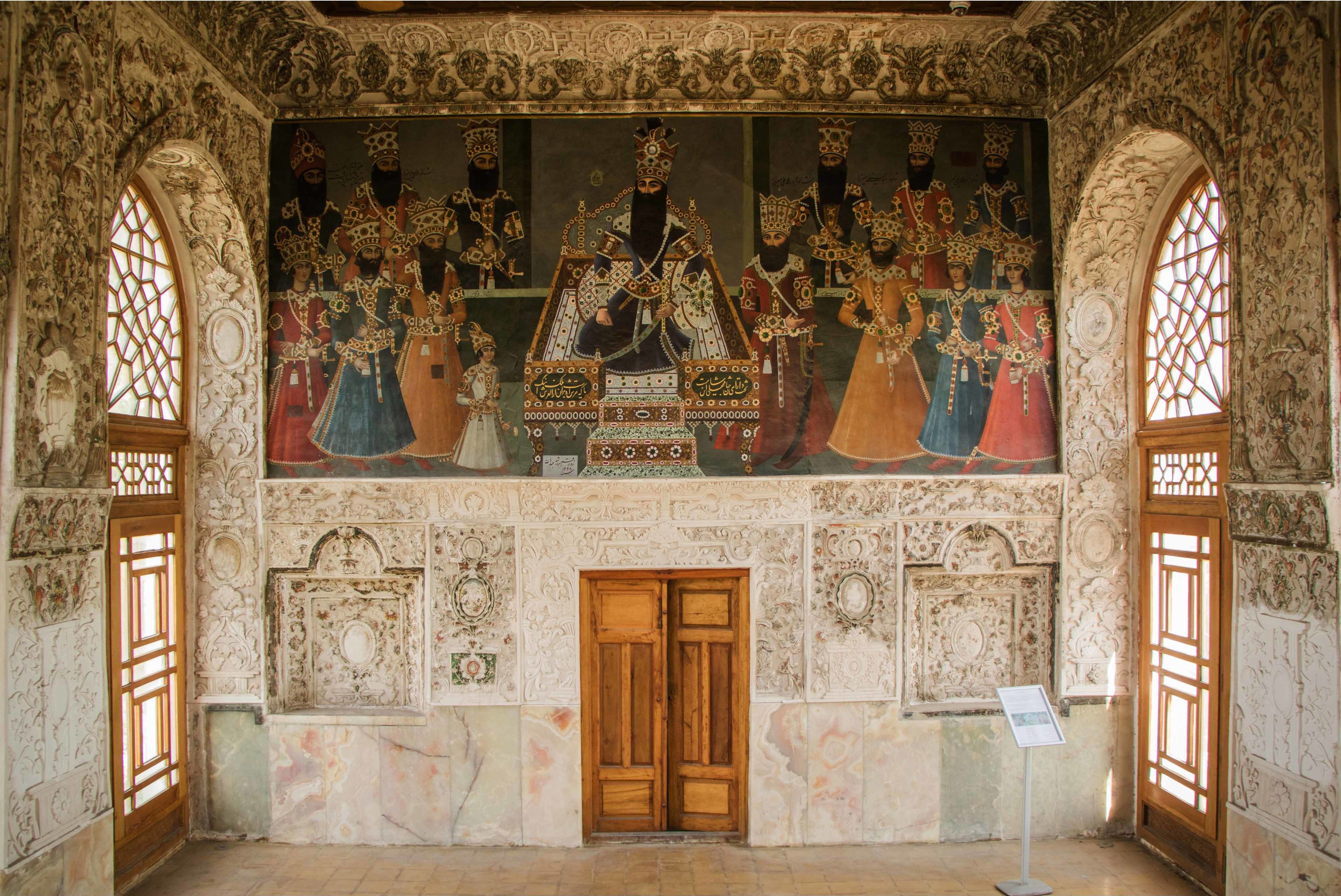
Painting of Fath-Ali Shah with his sons and courtiers

The ruins of the first floor of a five-story Safavid tower remain near the palace.

It was listed in the national heritage sites of Iran with the number 370 on 21 February, 1949.

== Gallery ==
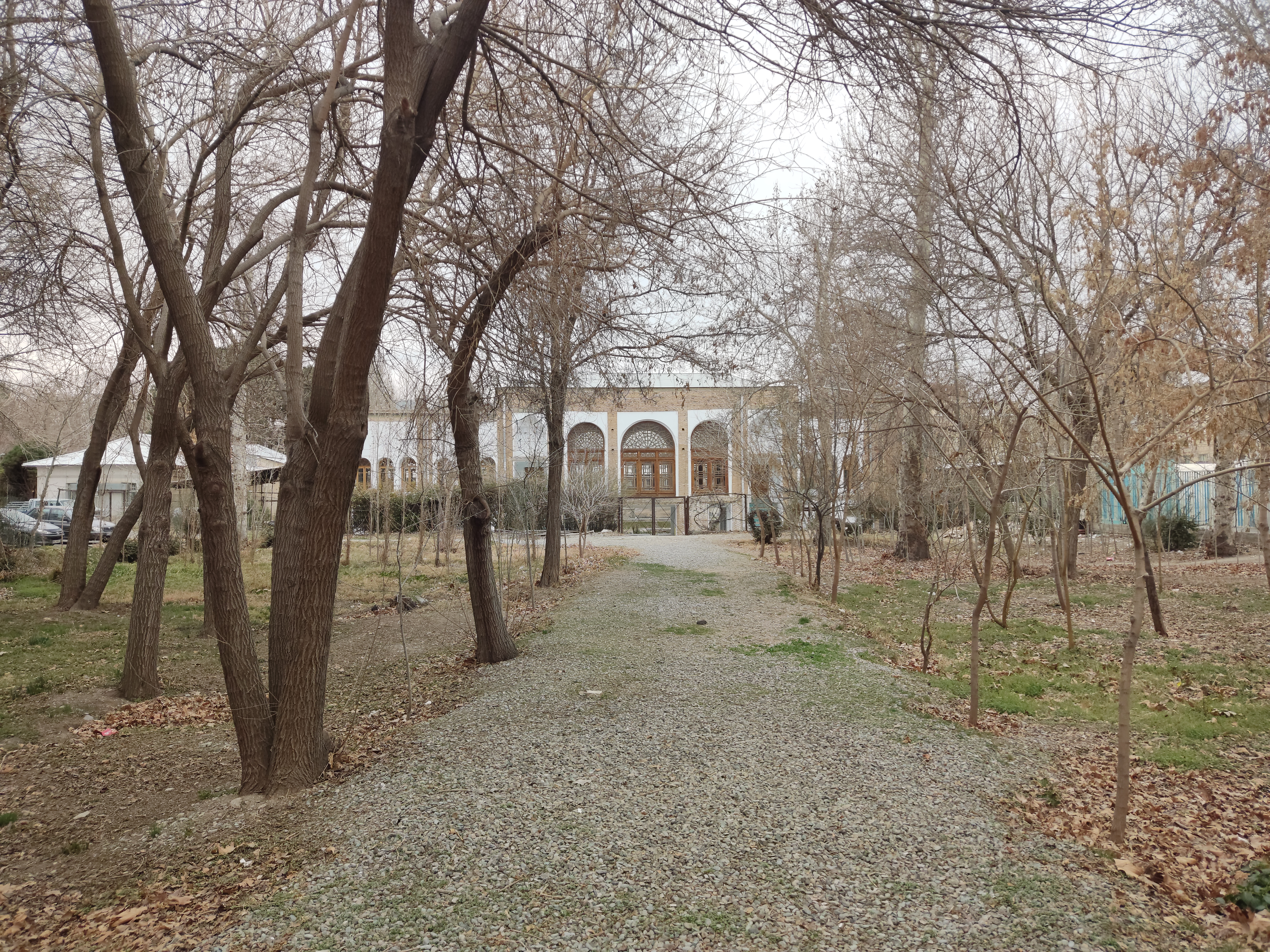
Northern facade from the garden, 2024

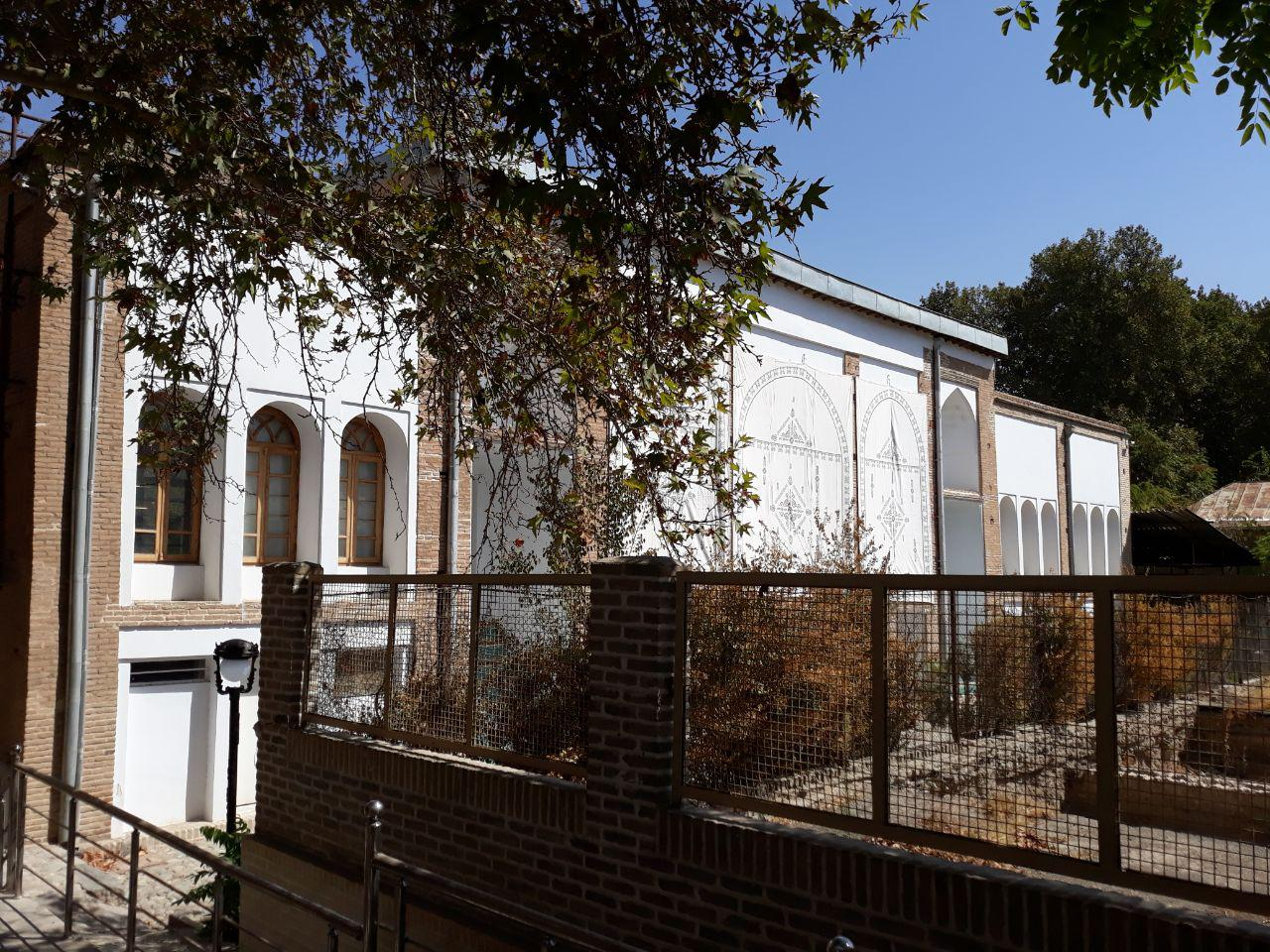
Southern facade, 2018

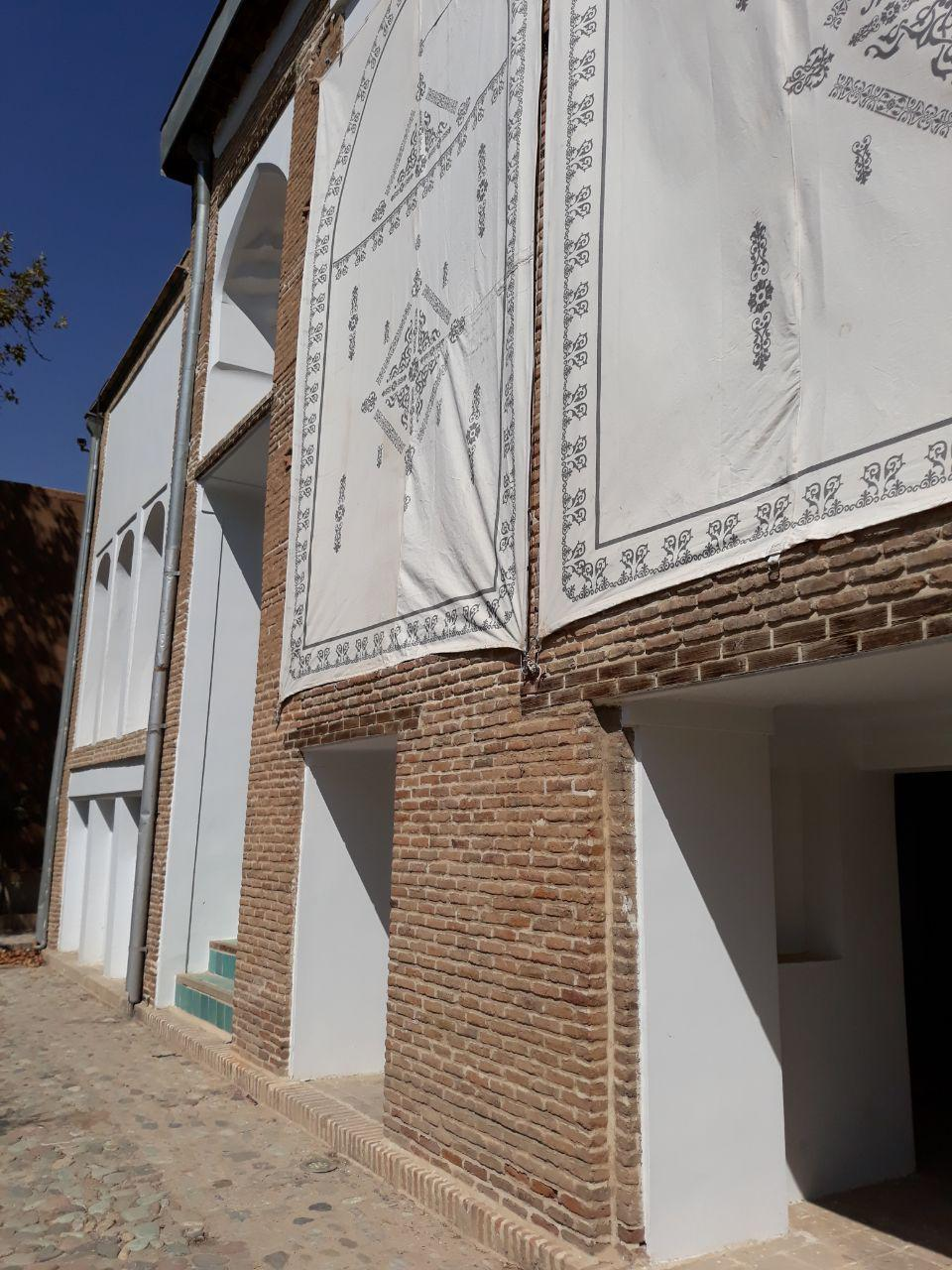
Southern entrance, 2018

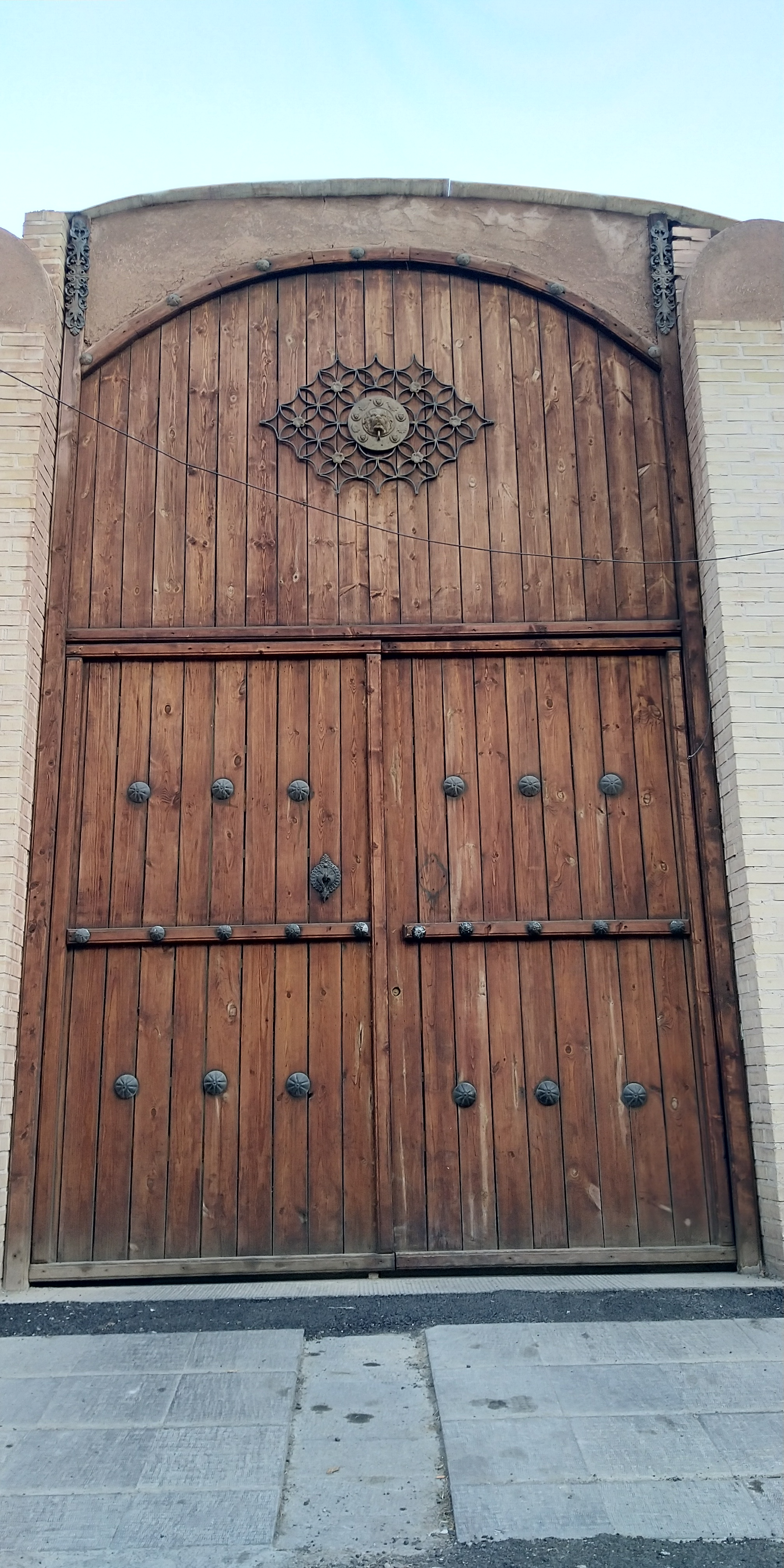
Entrance, 2020

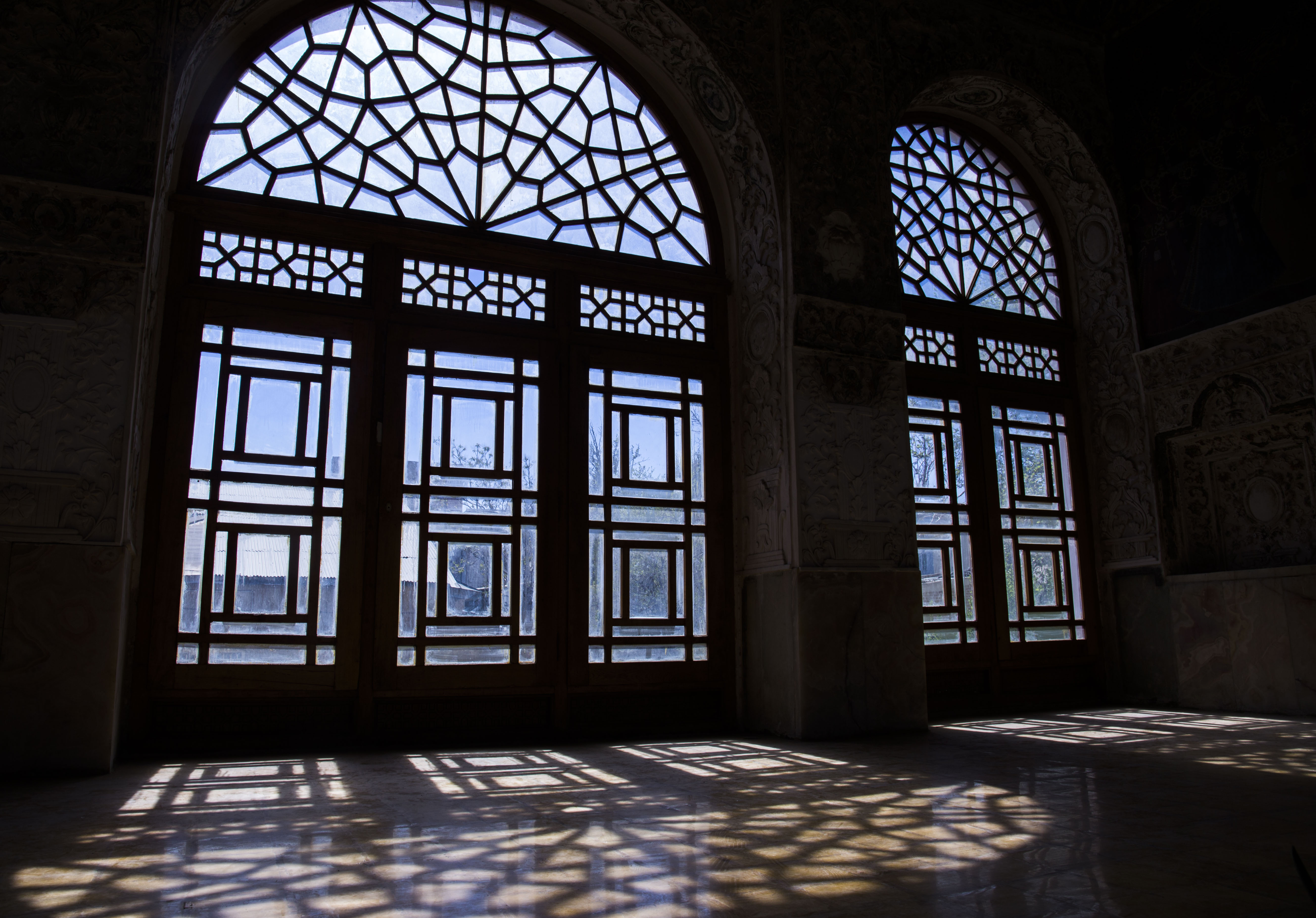
Interior, 2018
