= Negarestan Palace =

Iranian national heritage site

- کاخ نگارستان
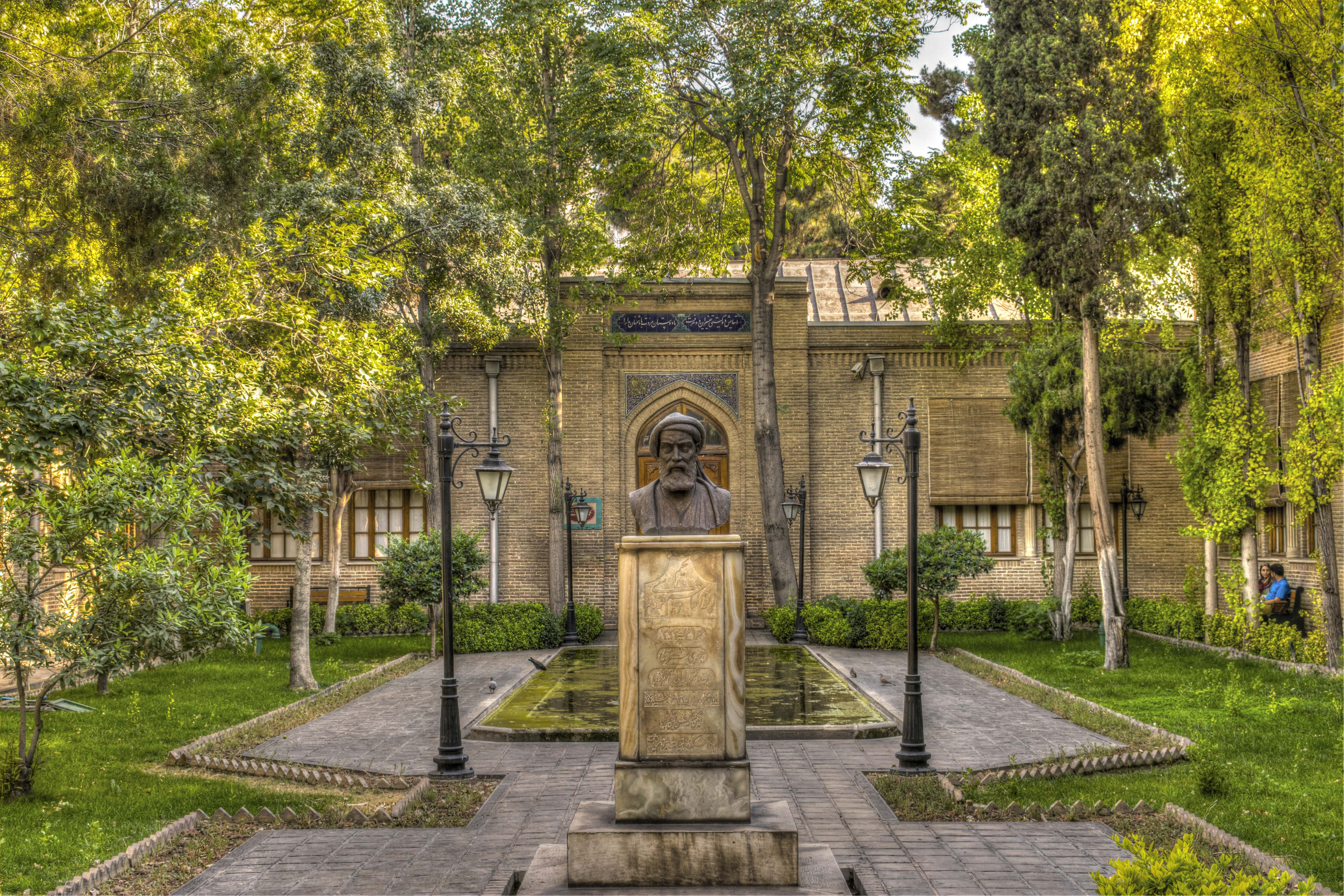

General information
- Location: Tehran, Iran
- Coordinates: 35°41′40″N 51°25′58″E
- Completed: 1807

The Negarestan Palace (Persian: کاخ نگارستان) or the Negarestan Garden (باغ نگارستان) is a historic building in Tehran, Iran. It was built as a summer residence by the order of Fath-Ali Shah Qajar in 1807.

== Name ==
The name Negarestan is based on a room in the palace with a large number of paintings, mostly portraits, being displayed. Negar (Persian: نگار) means "Picture," "image," or "Painting," and as such Negarestan means "Place of paintings".

== History ==
After Fath-Ali Shah's death, Mohammad Shah Qajar had his coronation in the Negarestan Palace. This was also the place where Qaem Maqam Farahani was killed by the orders of Mohammad Shah. For a while, it was used as an agriculture school, school of fine arts, and also served as the seat for the Ministry of Justice.

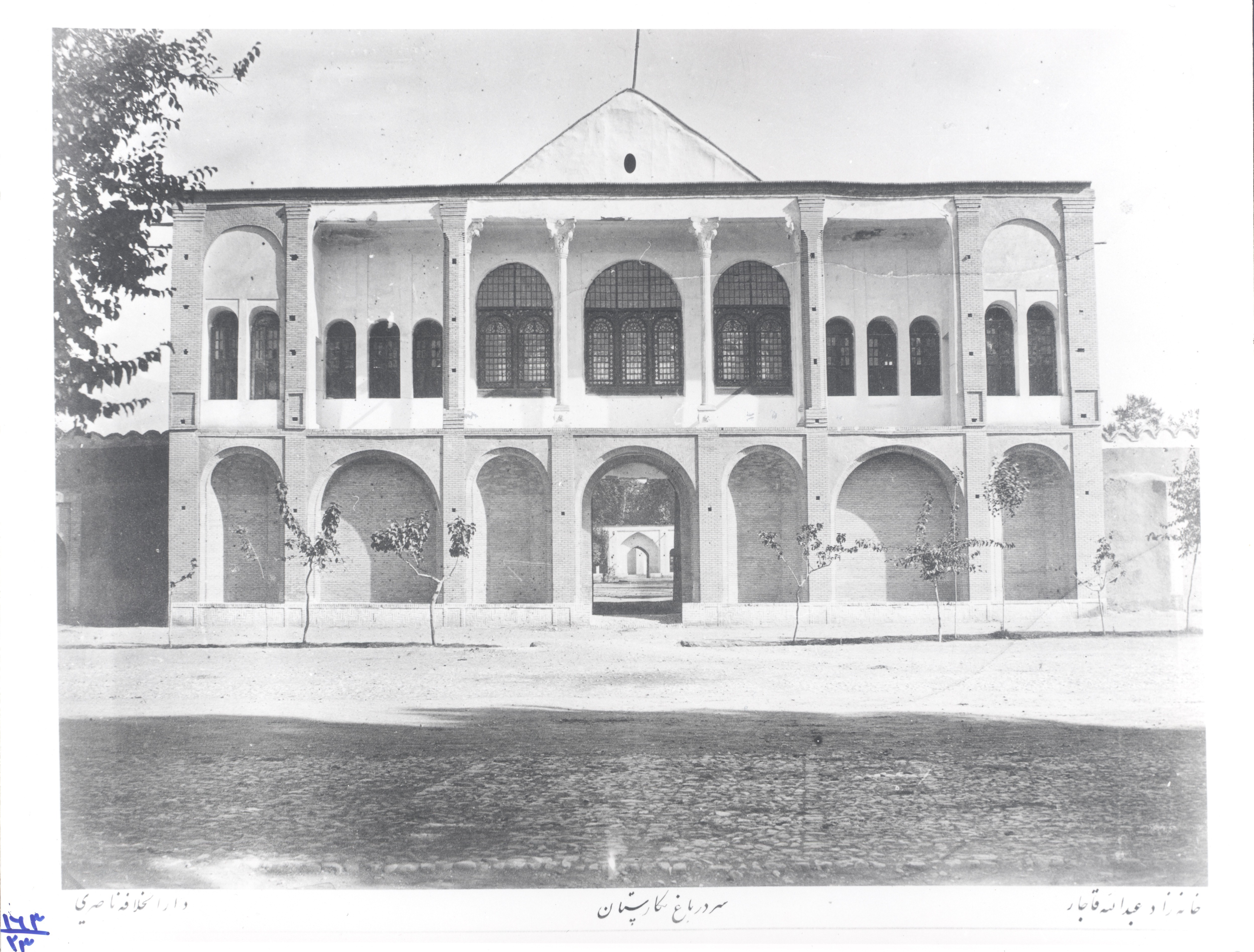
The gate of Negarestan garden by Abdollah Mirza Qajar, late 19th century

Jean-Baptiste Feuvrier, Naser ed-Din Shah Qajar's personal physician, writes about how a camel was sacrificed on Eid al Adha in Negarestan every year.

== Gallery ==
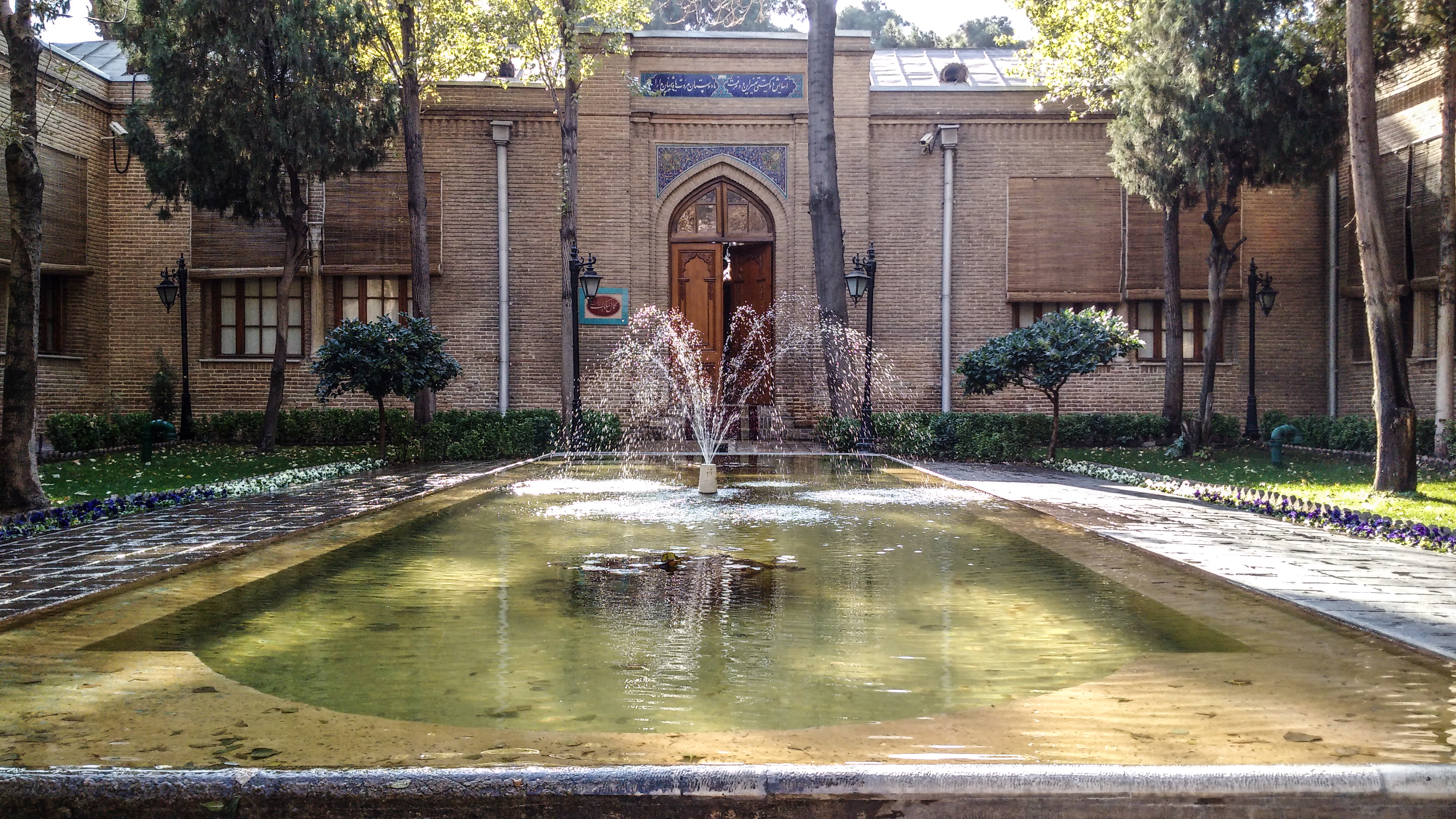

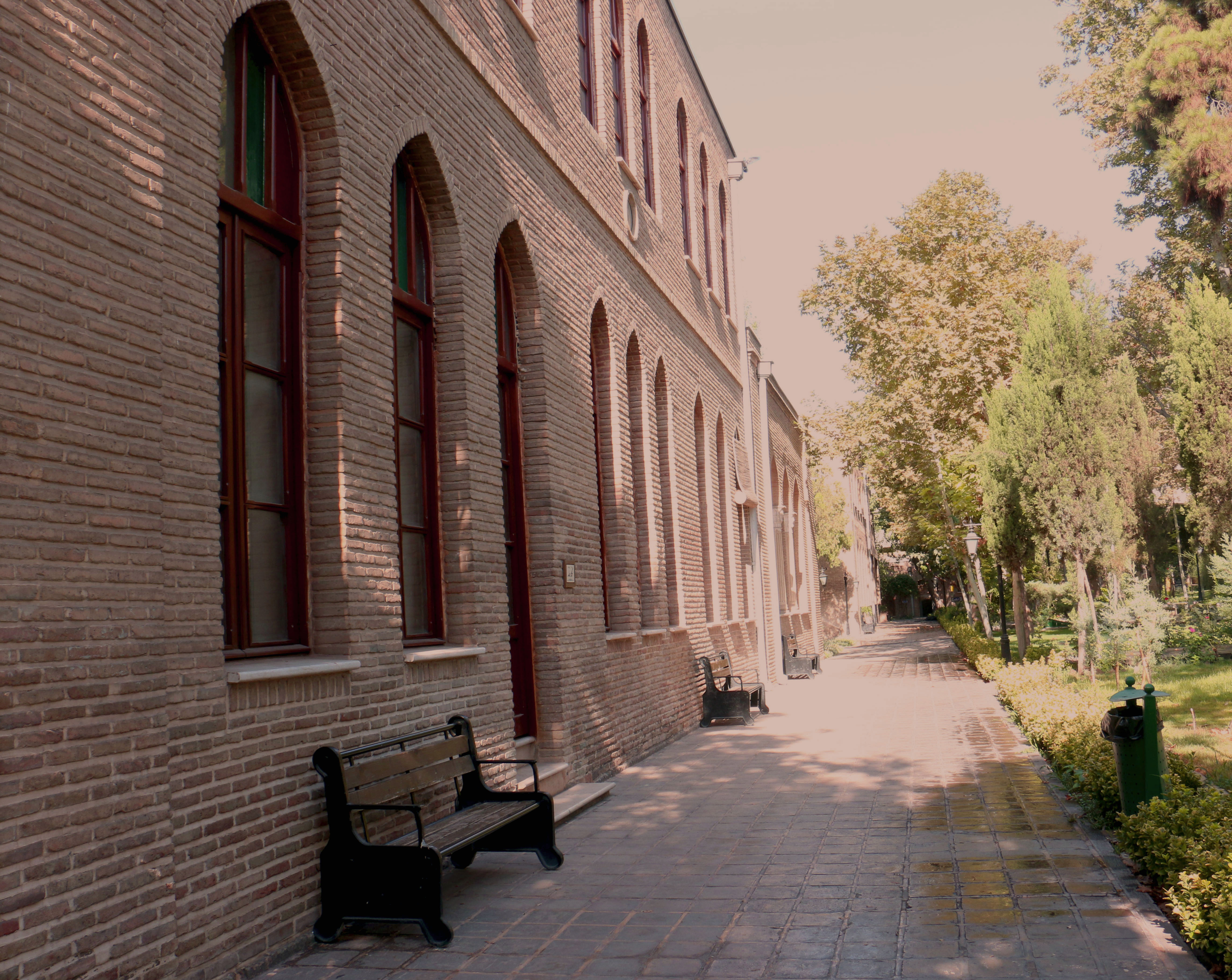

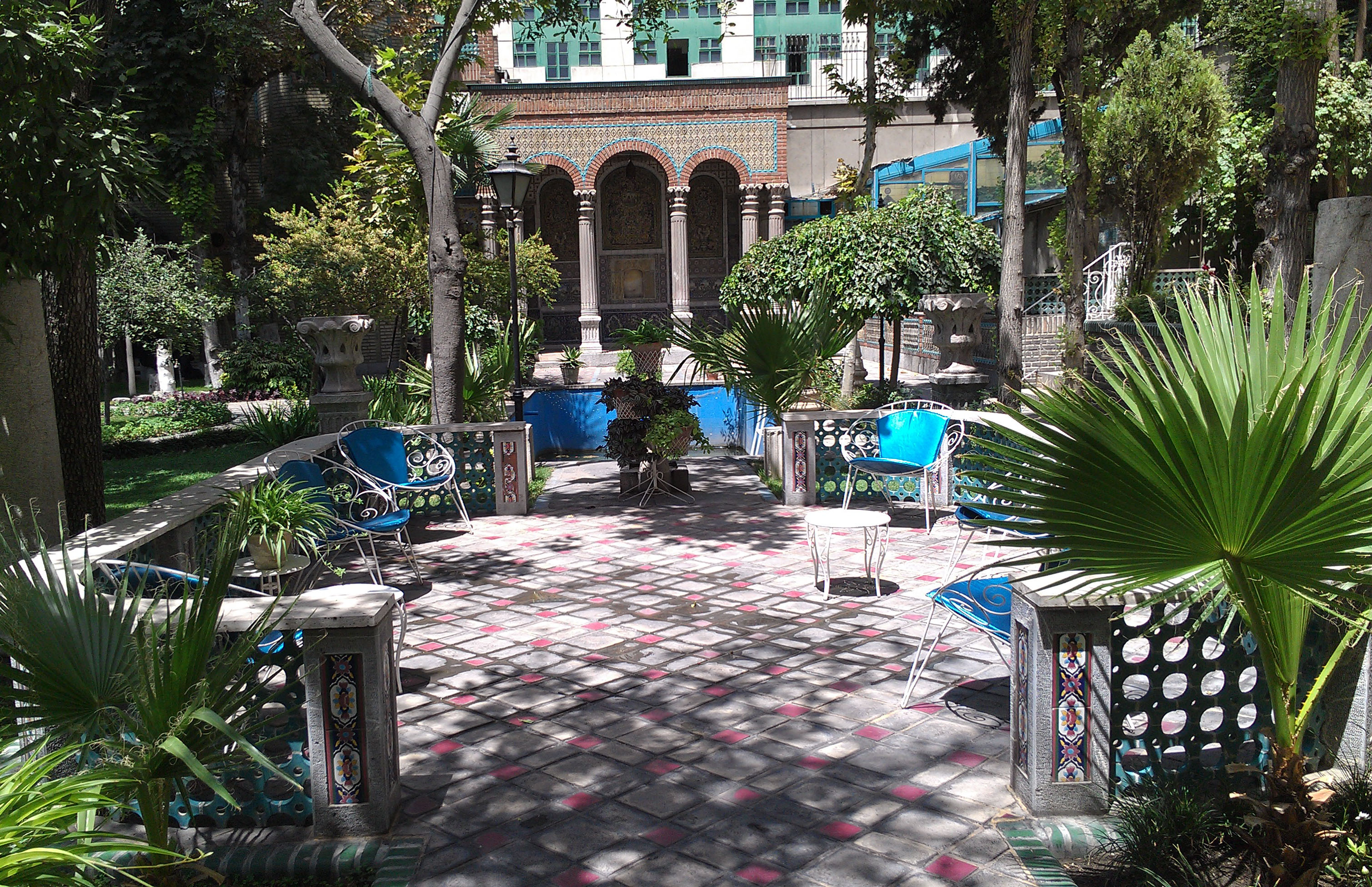

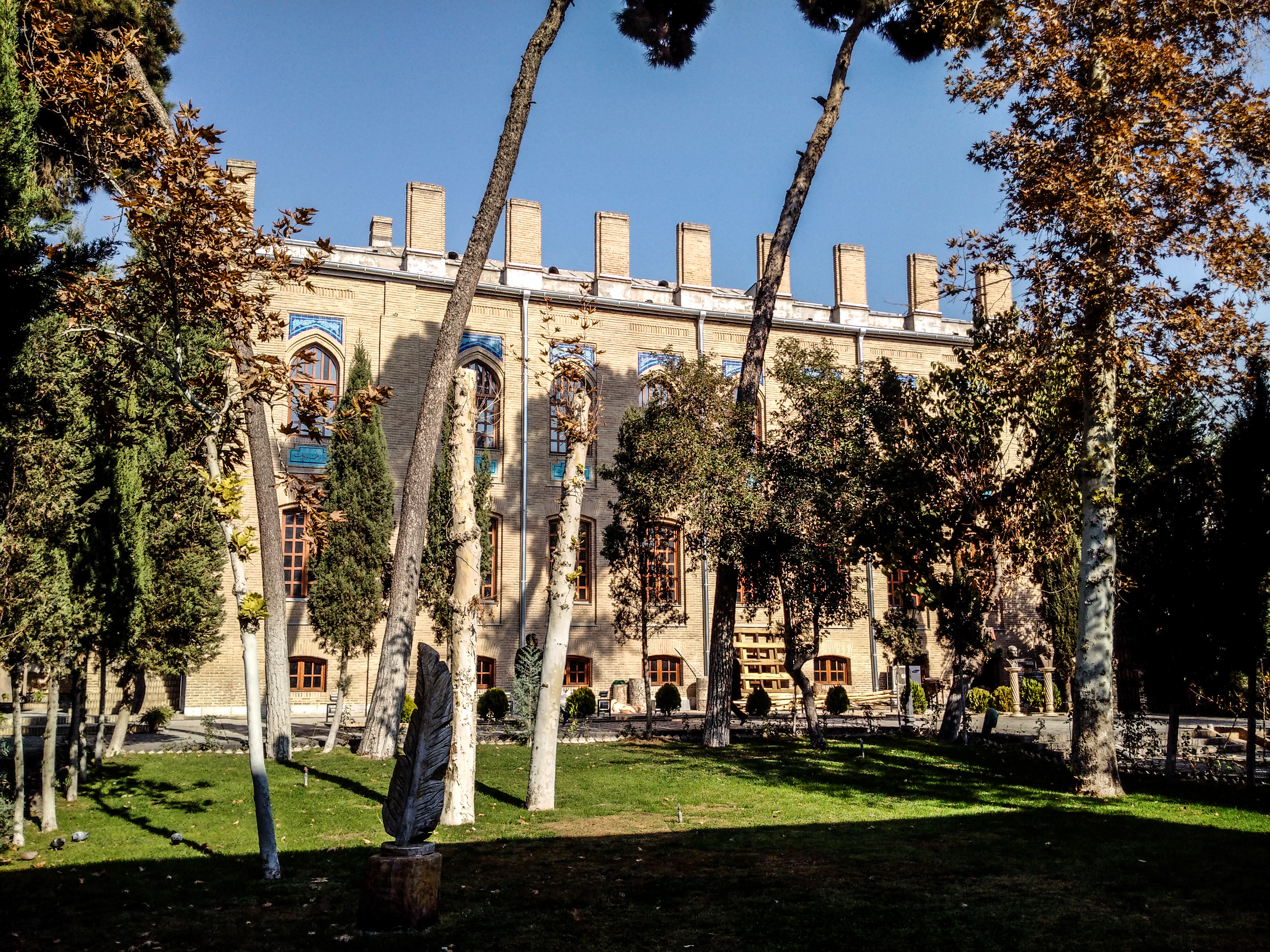

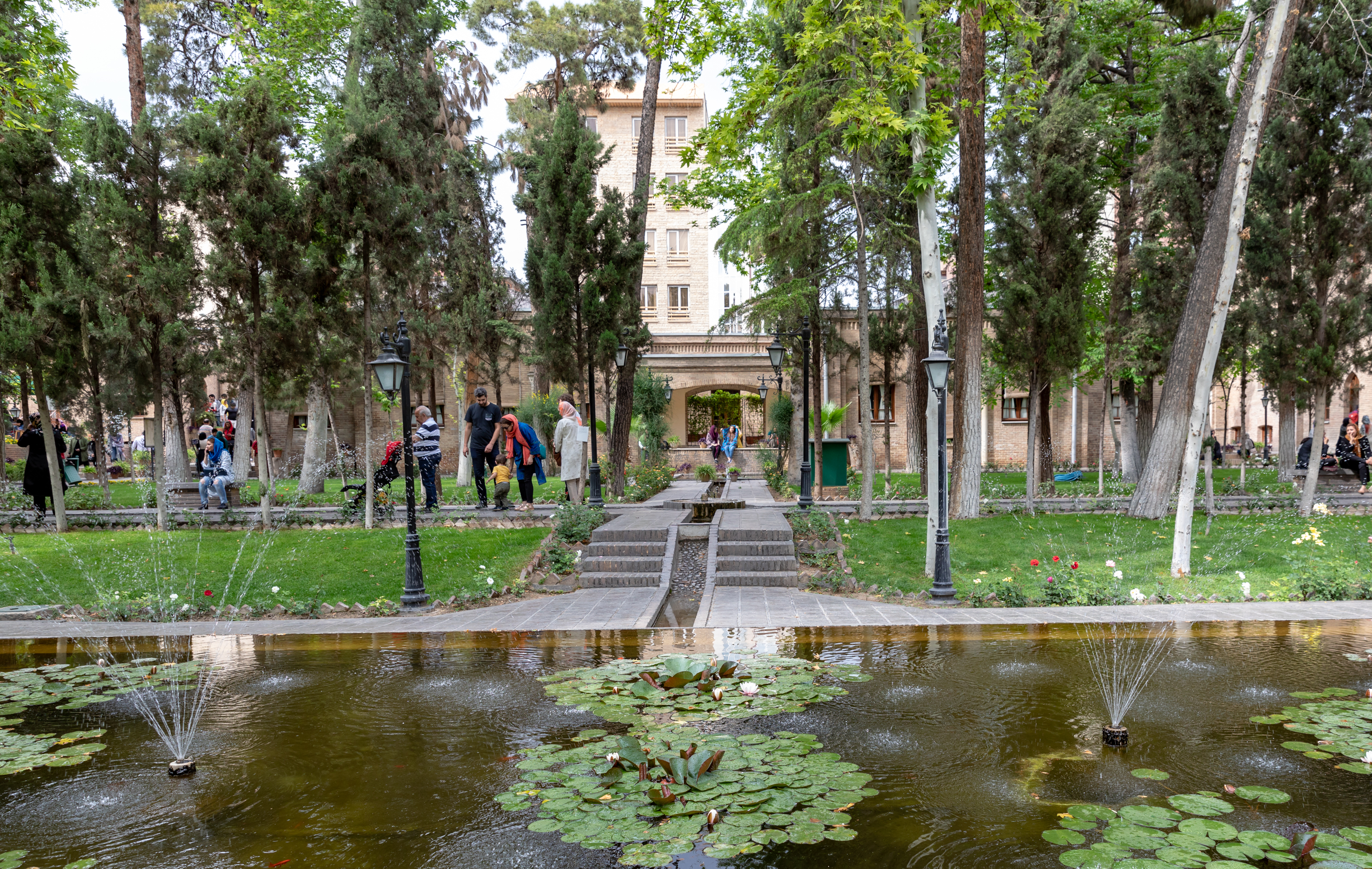

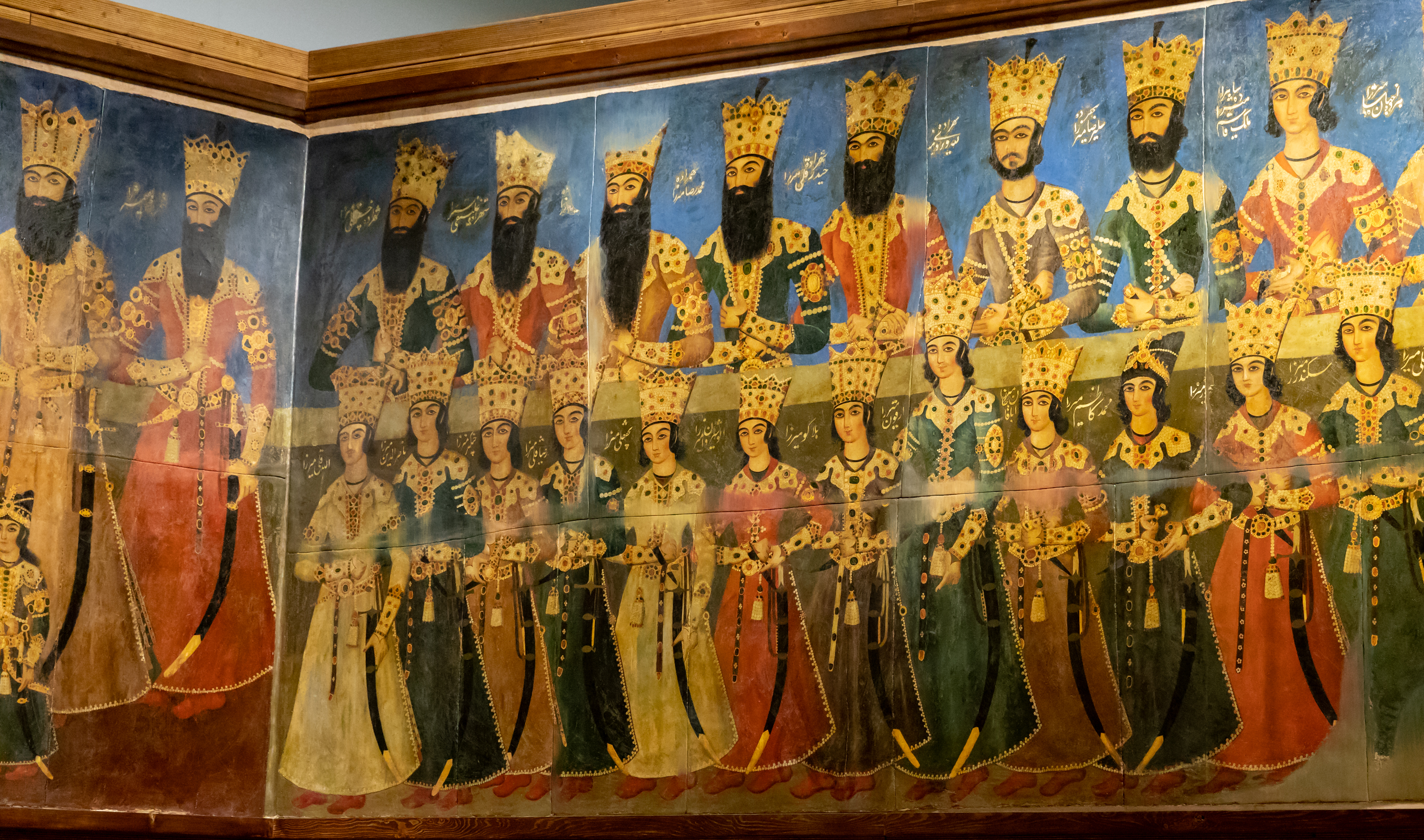

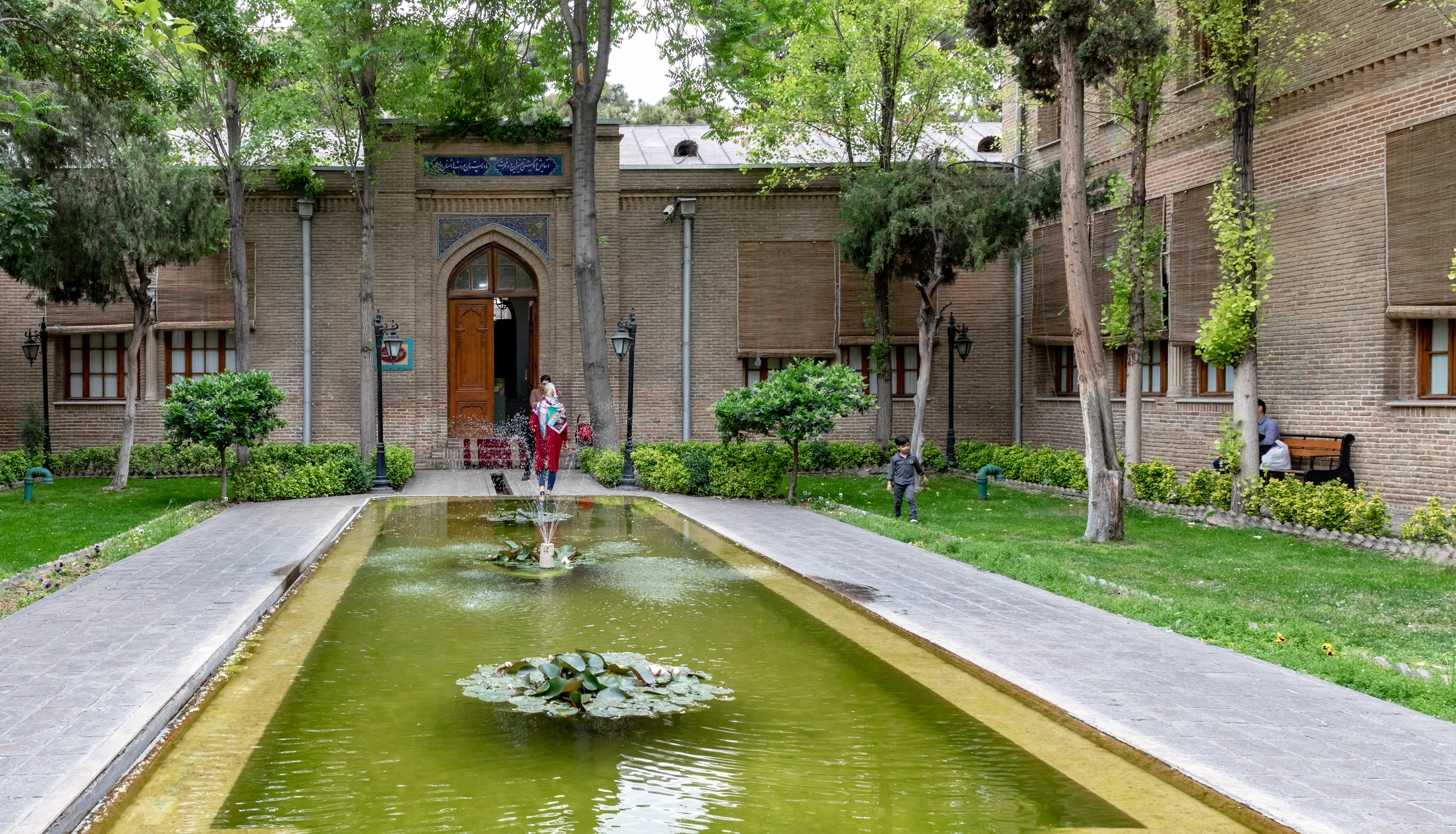

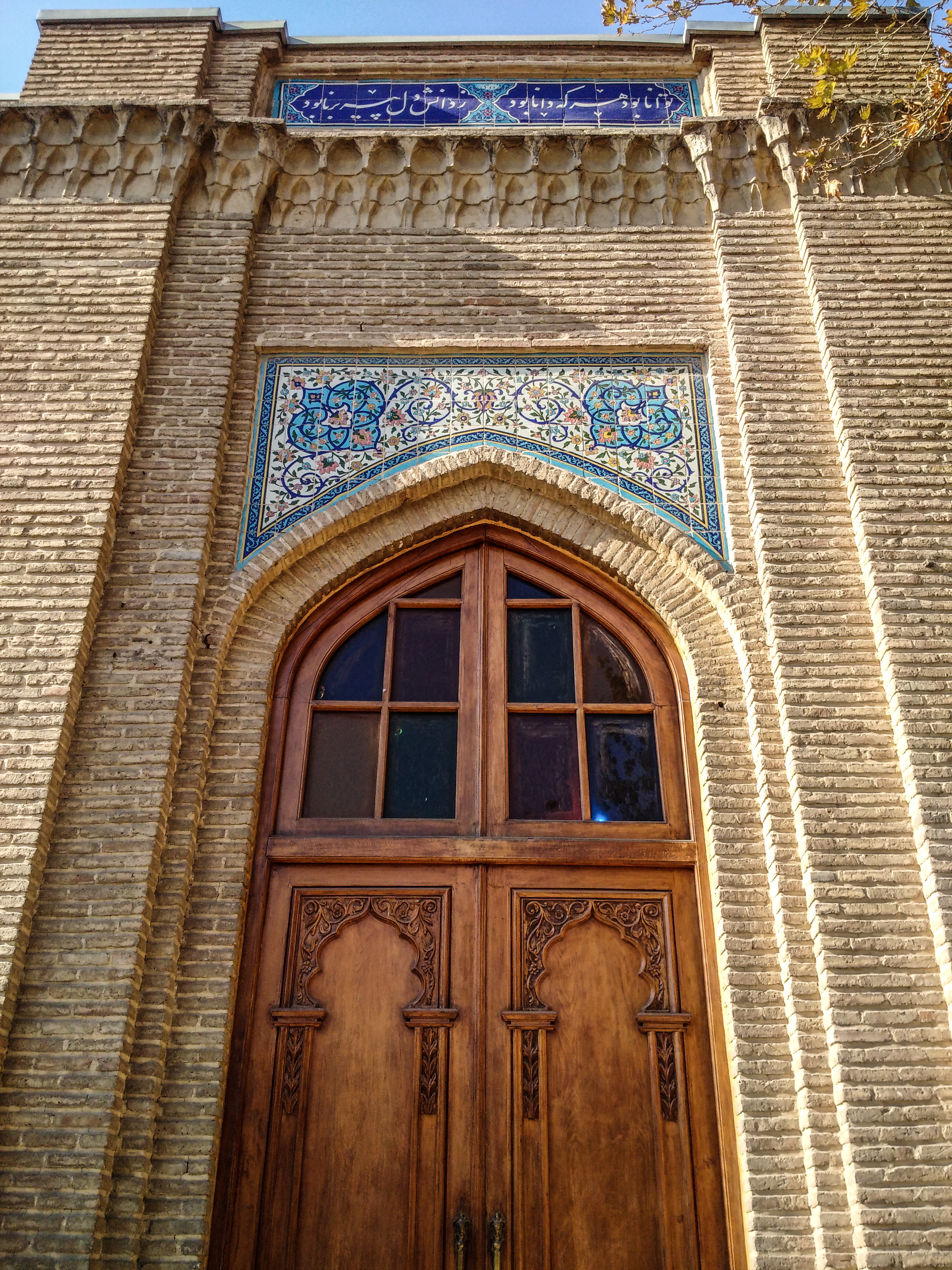

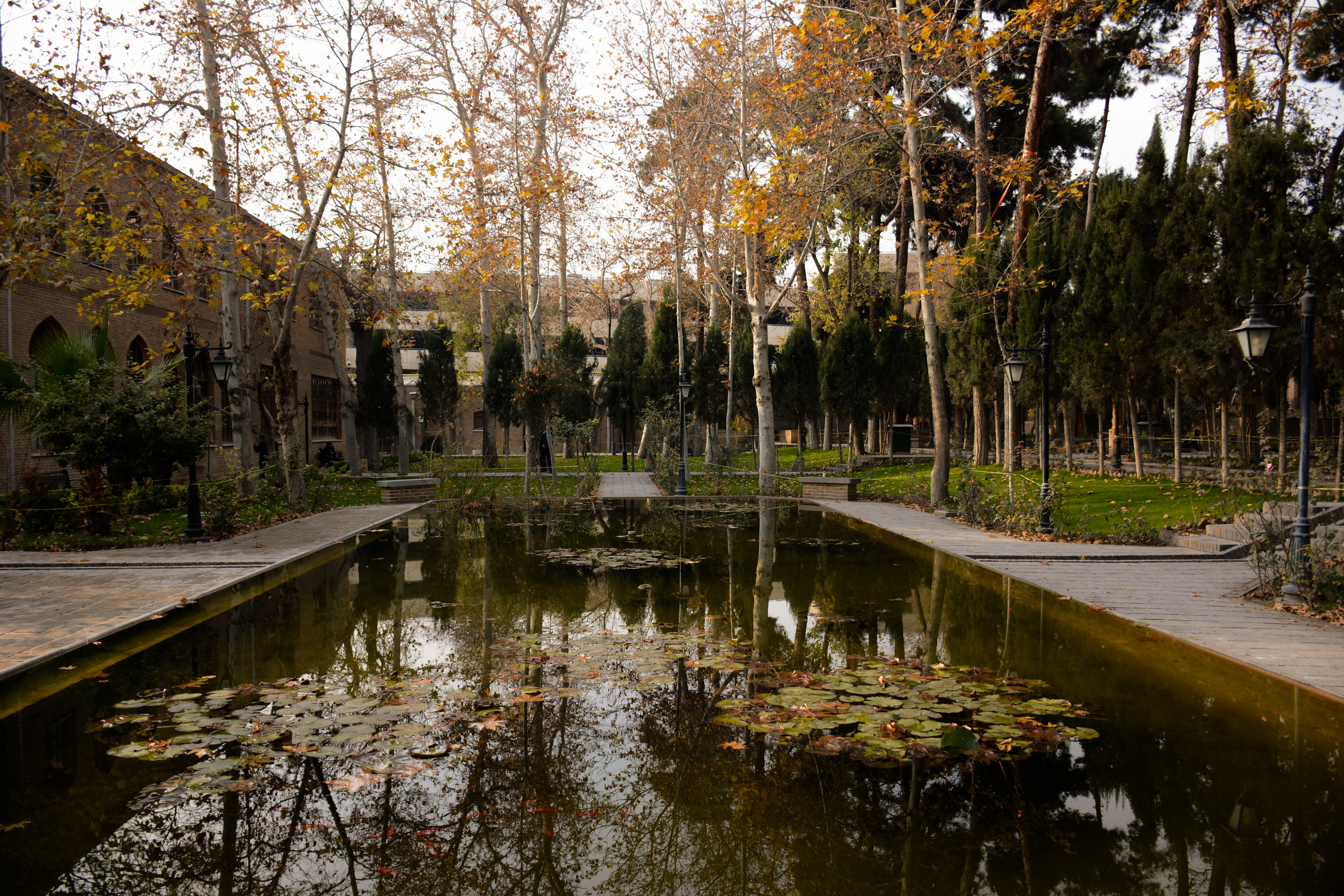

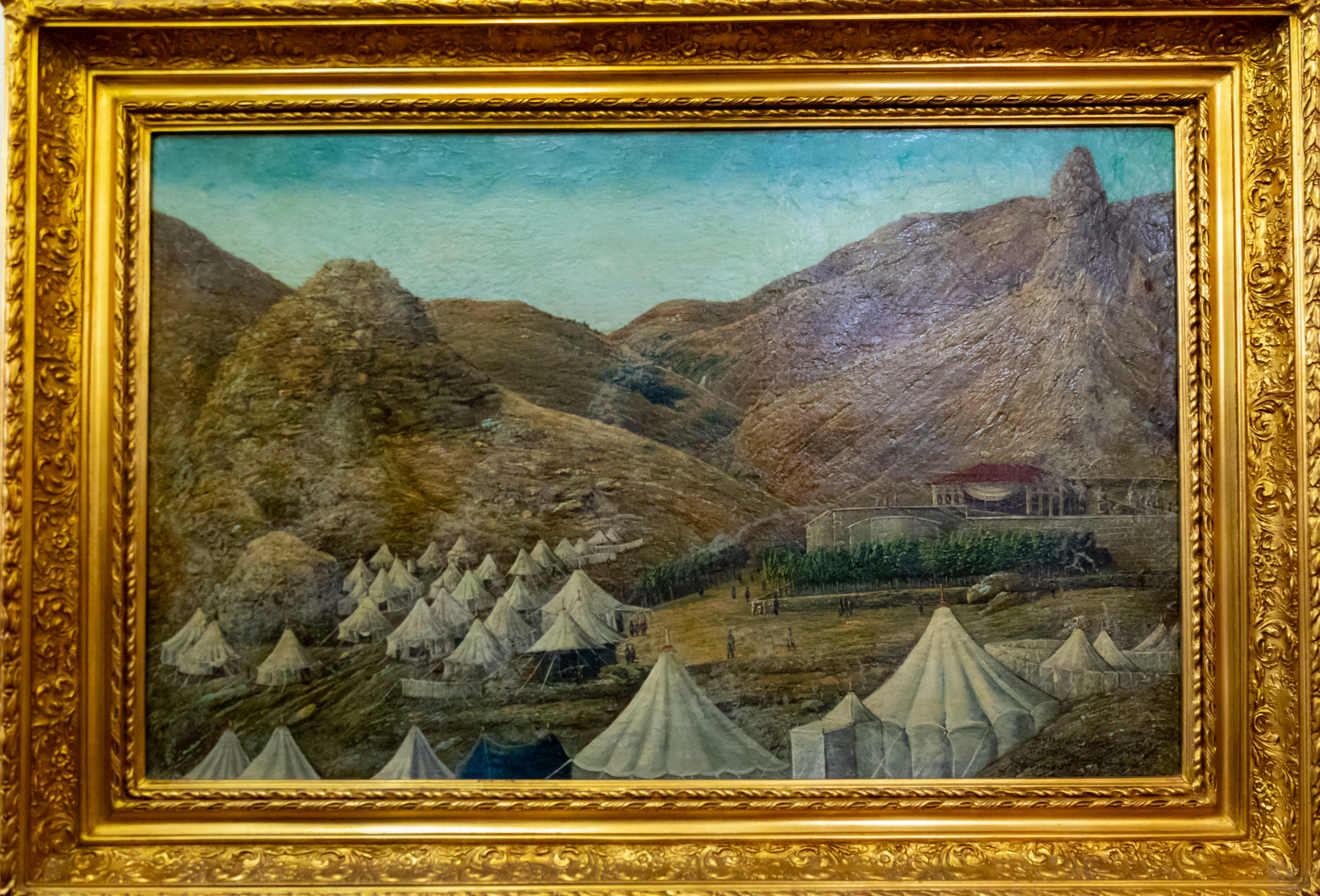

== See also ==
- Naser al-Din Shah's slide
