= William Price (orientalist) =

English orientalist

William Price (1780–1830) was an English orientalist.

== Life ==
Price was born at Worcester. In 1810, he was appointed assistant secretary and interpreter to the embassy of Sir Gore Ouseley to Persia which travelled there from 1811 to 1812.

On his return to England, Price wrote and taught oriental languages at the seminary of his friend, Alexander Humphreys, at Netherstone House, near Worcester. He set up a private printing press in his house, and became a member of the Royal Asiatic Society of London and the Asiatic Society of Calcutta. He died in June 1830.

== Works ==
Price kept a diary in Persia, and made hundreds of drawings, of landscapes and buildings. He deciphered many cuneiform inscriptions. He published:

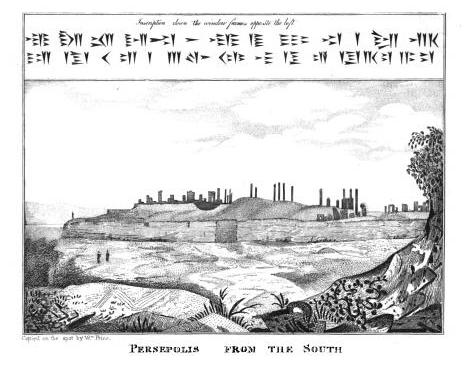
Persepolis from the South (1825), from A Journal of the British Embassy to Persia by William Price

- Dialogues Persans, composés pour l'auteur par Mirza Saulih de Chiraz, no date or place, republished, with an English translation, Worcester, 1822, and again as part iii. of:
- A Grammar of the Three Principal Oriental Languages, Hindoostanee, Persian, and Arabic, on a Plan entirely new, London, 1823.
- A Journal of the British Embassy to Persia, embellished with numerous Views taken in India and Persia; also a Dissertation upon the Antiquities of Persepolis, London, 1825. A second edition contained Elements of Sanskrit, or an Easy Guide to the Indian Tongues, Worcester, 1827; London, 1832. It was illustrated by Price's drawings.
- A new Grammar of the Hindoostanee Language, issued under the auspices of the East India Company, London, 1828.
- Husn oo Dil, or Beauty and Heart: an Allegory, Persian and English, translated by Price, London, 1828; dedicated to the Royal Asiatic Society.
- Hindu and Hindoostanee Selections, from which material was drawn for the Chants populaires de l'Inde (1860) of Garcin de Tassy.
