= Norman Lykes House =

House in Phoenix, Arizona

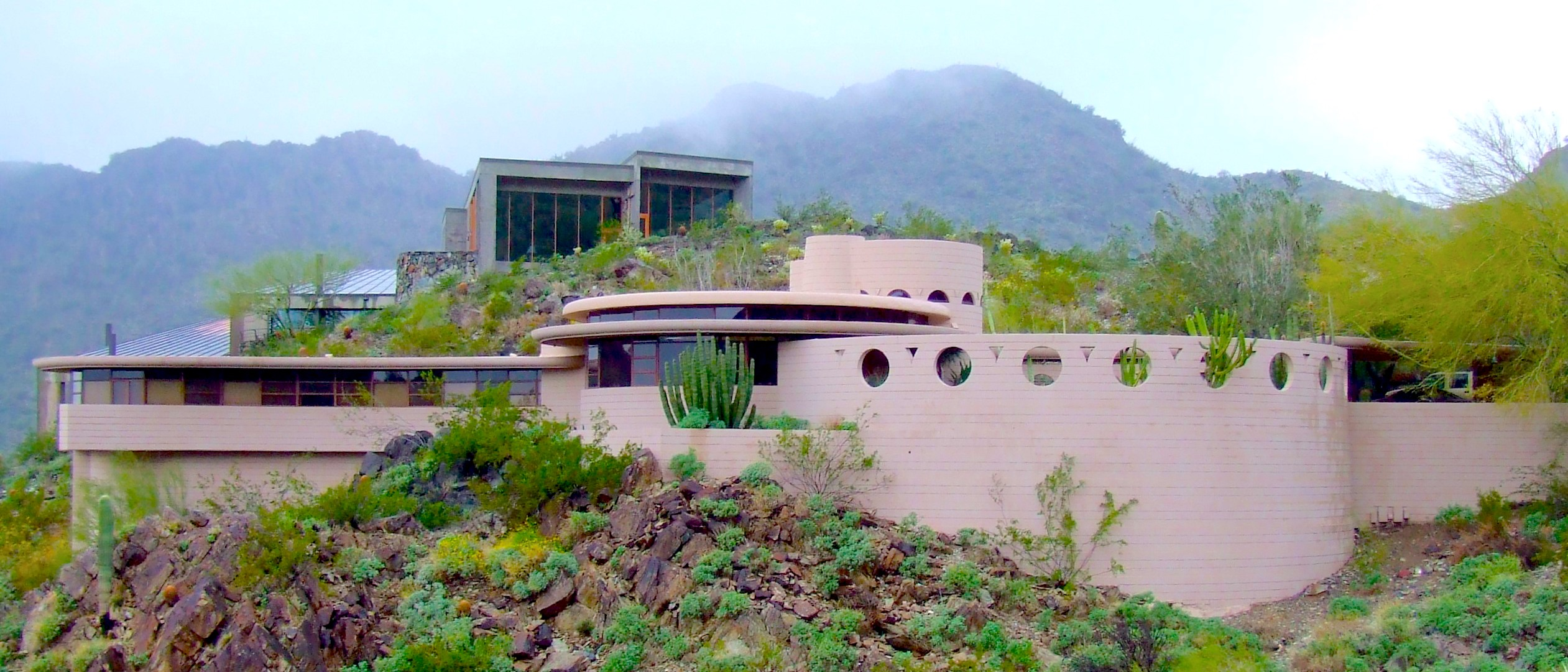
- Interactive map of the Norman Lykes House area
- Alternative names: Circular Sun House

General information
- Architectural style: Organic architecture
- Location: 6836 North 36th Street, Phoenix, Arizona, United States
- Coordinates: 33.5387°N 112.0030°W
- Completed: 1967
- Renovated: 1994
- Client: Norman and Aimee Lykes

Technical details
- Floor count: 2 (+1 basement)
- Floor area: 3,095 ft^{2} (287.5 m^{2})

Design and construction
- Architects: Frank Lloyd Wright, John Rattenbury

Renovating team
- Architect: John Rattenbury

The Norman Lykes House (also known as the Circular Sun House) is a residence at 6836 North 36th Street in the Biltmore Area of Phoenix, Arizona, United States. Designed in 1959 by the architect Frank Lloyd Wright in an organic style, the two-story house was his last residential design, and was completed in 1967 by his onetime apprentice John Rattenbury of Taliesin Associated Architects. As built, the structure contained five bedrooms. The Lykes family sold the house in the early 1990s to Linda Melton, who hired Rattenbury to renovate the house and combine the bedrooms into three. After Melton's death, the building was placed for sale in 2016, though it was not sold for three years. The new owner placed the house for sale in 2020, and the house again remained unsold for several years.

The house, occupying 1 1/3 acres (0.54 ha) on the slope of a mountain, consists of a circular main section, a curved wing and a curved courtyard. It is one of 14 circular residences that Wright designed, as well as one of six that he designed around Phoenix. The facade is made primarily of rose-tinted concrete, with steel casement windows and geometric cutouts. Inside, the house has 3,095 square feet (287.5 m^{2}), with living spaces on the main level, an entertainment room in the basement, and three bedrooms on the second story. The house's circular floor plan and its integration with the surrounding landscape have generally been praised over the years.

== History ==
The two-story home was designed by Wright for his clients Norman and Aimee Lykes in 1959, shortly before Wright died. Nicknamed the Circular Sun House, it was the last house Wright ever designed. Wright selected the site because of its location overlooking Palm Canyon, designing sketches based on the location. Wright's apprentice John Rattenbury wrote that Wright had sketched out a plan for two overlapping circles before walking out of his Taliesin West studio in Scottsdale; within two days, he had been hospitalized. After Wright's death, the Lykes family hired Rattenbury to take over the design, which was finished in 1967. (Note: The author William Allin Storrer gives an alternative date of 1968.) The Lykes family used the house for almost three decades afterward. At one point, the house was used as a dormitory for apprentices studying at Taliesin West.

The Lykes family sold the house in 1992, 1993, or 1994 to Linda Melton for $500,000. Melton had reportedly wanted to own a Wright–designed home for years; according to Mansion Global magazine, she called the house's real-estate agent after driving past the Lykes House and seeing that it was for sale. Rattenbury was hired to redesign the interior in 1994, adding a home media room within a former workshop space, as well as increasing the master bedroom's size. In addition, two of the bedrooms were merged into a single guest room, and a new heating, ventilation, and air conditioning system was installed. The original windows were replaced with movable panels to allow ventilation, while a swimming pool was built within a courtyard. The project, which took two years, also involved restoring the remaining rooms to their 1967 appearance. The Frank Lloyd Wright Foundation, which operated Taliesin West, approved all the modifications. Ron Steege oversaw the renovation, which cost between $300,000 and $400,000.

Melton's daughter, Julie Franks, later said that fans of Wright's work from around the world would travel to their house, sometimes in the middle of the night. Following Melton's death, the Lykes House was placed for sale in 2016. The house remained on sale for two years, but no one made an offer for the building, prompting its owner to reduce the asking price in 2018. Its asking price was reduced again the next year after the revised sale price still failed to attract buyers. According to its brokers, relatively few people knew about the house before it was listed for sale, even among those who wanted to buy it at the time. The lack of bids prompted its brokers to auction the house off in late 2019, with nearly 20 bidders expressing interest in the building.

Ultimately, the house was sold in October 2019 to Kamyar Kakinma for about $1.6 million, less than half the original asking price. The new owner planned to use it as a vacation home, but this did not occur, and the owner began renting out the building in early 2020. The house was listed for sale again in 2020. It was still unsold two years later, prompting its real-estate agent to propose that the house be sold to a partnership of as many as six people. As of 2025, the house was being rented out through Airbnb; the house was again placed on sale in early 2026.

== Description ==
The Lykes House is located at 6836 North 36th Street in Phoenix, Arizona, United States, within the Biltmore Area. Built in an organic architectural style, the house is one of 14 houses with a circular plan that Frank Lloyd Wright designed. It is also one of six houses that Wright designed around Phoenix, the others being those of the Adelman, Boomer, Carlson, and Price families and his son David. By 2012, there were four remaining buildings designed by Wright in Phoenix, and nine such buildings in Arizona.

The layout is based on an earlier design that Wright had designed in 1959 for Harvey Furgatch, a developer in San Diego. The building has similar design features to some of Wright's other curved structures, such as David's house, as well as the Solomon R. Guggenheim Museum in New York. Although Wright was responsible for the initial design, his onetime apprentice John Rattenbury, an architect for Taliesin Associated Architects, oversaw the completion of the building and is listed as the architect of record. In contrast to many of Wright's other designs, which are protected as official landmarks, the house is not listed on the National Register of Historic Places.

=== Exterior ===
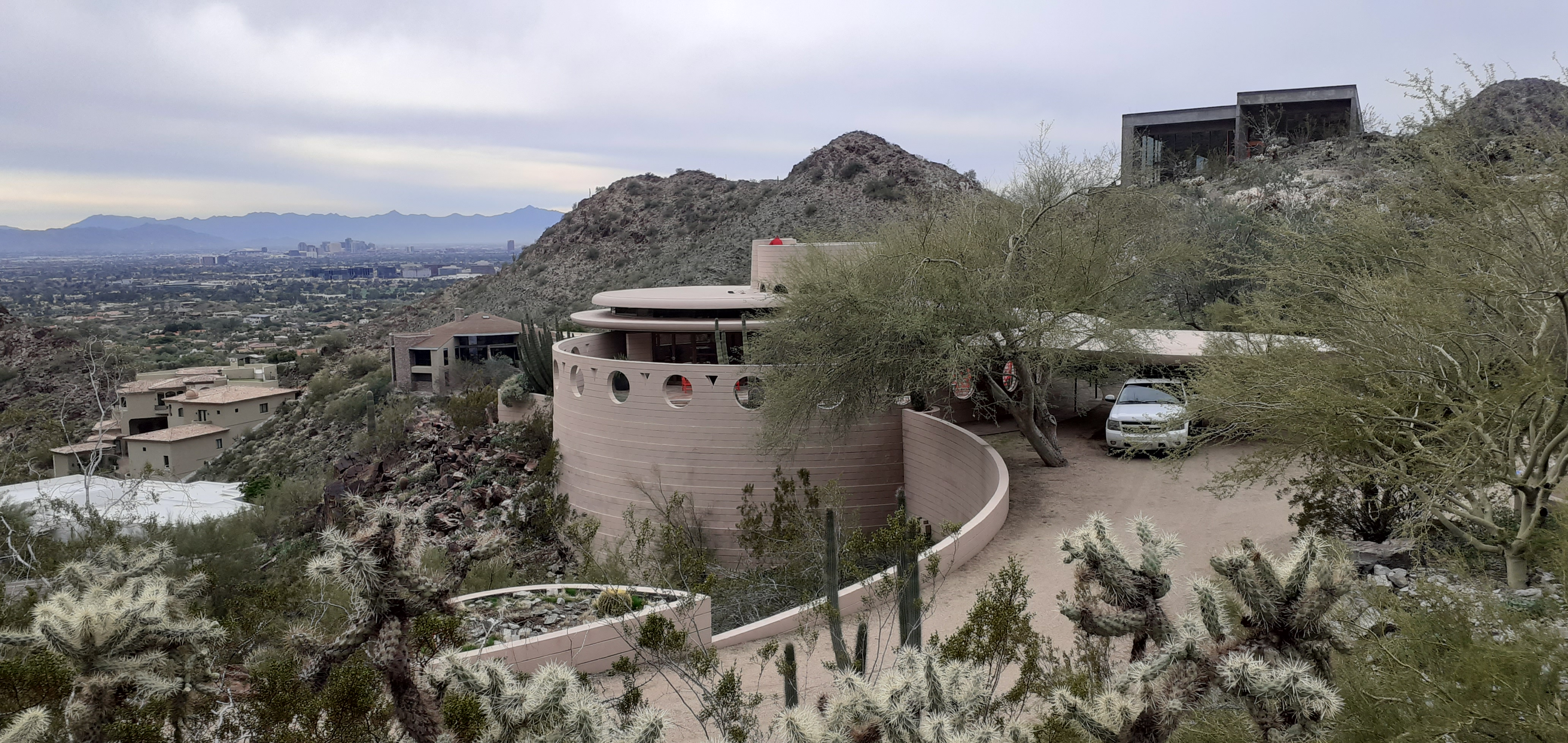
The house as seen from its driveway

The Lykes House occupies a 1 1/3-acre (5,400 m^{2}) site and is built on the slope of a mountain. In keeping with Wright's preference for organic architecture, the house was designed to blend in with the landscape. The general plan, as seen from overhead, consists of several overlapping circles, which were drawn around five distinct geometric centers. A curving wing splits off the circular main section of the house. There is a large circular courtyard with a lawn and terrace just outside the main house, surrounded by a parapet. Circular and triangular cutouts are placed along the parapet. A crescent-shaped pool is located within the courtyard, surrounded by a patio with mother-of-pearl tiles. Wright, who disliked garages, built a simpler carport accessed by a curving driveway. In addition, he built a storage shed next to the house.

The structure is made primarily of rose-tinted concrete. Unlike Wright's other designs, which tended to face inward or away from crowded areas, the building's windows face Downtown Phoenix to the south. The facade contains steel casement windows, which were arranged so that the house's occupants could see the valley below. Spread across the facade are half-moon-shaped lunette windows. The windows are topped by ledges to prevent large amounts of sunlight from heating up the house's interior, and there is a glass wall facing the patio and pool area.

=== Interior ===
The house has three bedrooms and three bathrooms, spread across 3,095 square feet (287.5 m^{2}). When the house was built, it had five bedrooms, some of which were characterized as being similar in size to a closet. Two of the bedrooms have been removed or combined with other spaces over the years, as Wright had intended for the walls to be relocated or removed for flexibility. The interior is decorated with Philippine mahogany, and there is built-in storage space along the house's curving hallways. Wright designed built-in furnishings for the house as well, including the furniture and four custom chairs. The primary living areas are within the circular main house, while the bedrooms are in the curved wing.

The Lykes House has a low-ceilinged foyer leading to larger rooms, an example of Wright's compression-and-release principle. The living room has a stone floor, wood furniture, and banquette seats beneath the windows. In addition, the living room has a built-in entertainment center, a newspaper rack, storage space beneath the seats, and a conical fireplace with a concrete hearth. Next to the living room is a library with Philippine mahogany shelves, as well as a wet bar concealed behind a sliding door. There is a curved kitchen with stainless-steel counters, illuminated by lights underneath (similar to those at his Conrad Gordon House in Oregon). Wright added custom-made cabinets to the kitchen, and there is also a stove and two pantries. Next to the kitchen is a stairway ascending to the first floor. Within the basement is a media room, which is also described as a den and has small windows, some shelves, and an entertainment center.

The house had two offices when it was built. The main second-floor office is cylindrical and was added to the plan by Rattenbury. It is directly above the kitchen and has a built-in desk, shelves, cabinets, and magazine racks. Rattenbury and Wright deliberately placed the office's windows at eye level, and they added a built-in skylight above the desk. The original design included a smaller room next to the office, but that room was merged with the office during the house's 1990s renovation. The bedrooms each have desks and cabinets, though most of the storage space for these bedrooms were in the hallway connecting each room, where there are additional built-in cabinets. The master bedroom has a separate balcony, dressing room, and bathroom. The main bathroom, adjoining the master bedroom, is clad with rose marble tiles. The house has a secondary office as well, with lunette windows and built-in furnishings.

== Reception ==
Wright's longtime archivist Bruce Brooks Pfeiffer wrote that the house "appears, in fact, to barely light upon the desert rocks". Duncan Macmillan of The Scotsman, reviewing Wright's work in 1998, described the house as blending in with the surrounding landscape, calling it "as strange and romantically modern as a science fiction castle on Mars". An unnamed writer for the Sarnia Observer of Ontario characterized the building in 2017 as having a timeless design, while yet another commentator, Darla Guillen of The Norwalk Hour, compared the building to "a series of tan spindles". Patrick Sisson of Curbed magazine described the house's general plan in 2016 as resembling clock gears. By contrast, a 1983 article from The Arizona Republic described the house as beautiful but with a disorganized layout.

== See also ==
- List of Frank Lloyd Wright works
