= David and Gladys Wright House =

Residence in Phoenix, Arizona

- U.S. National Register of Historic Places
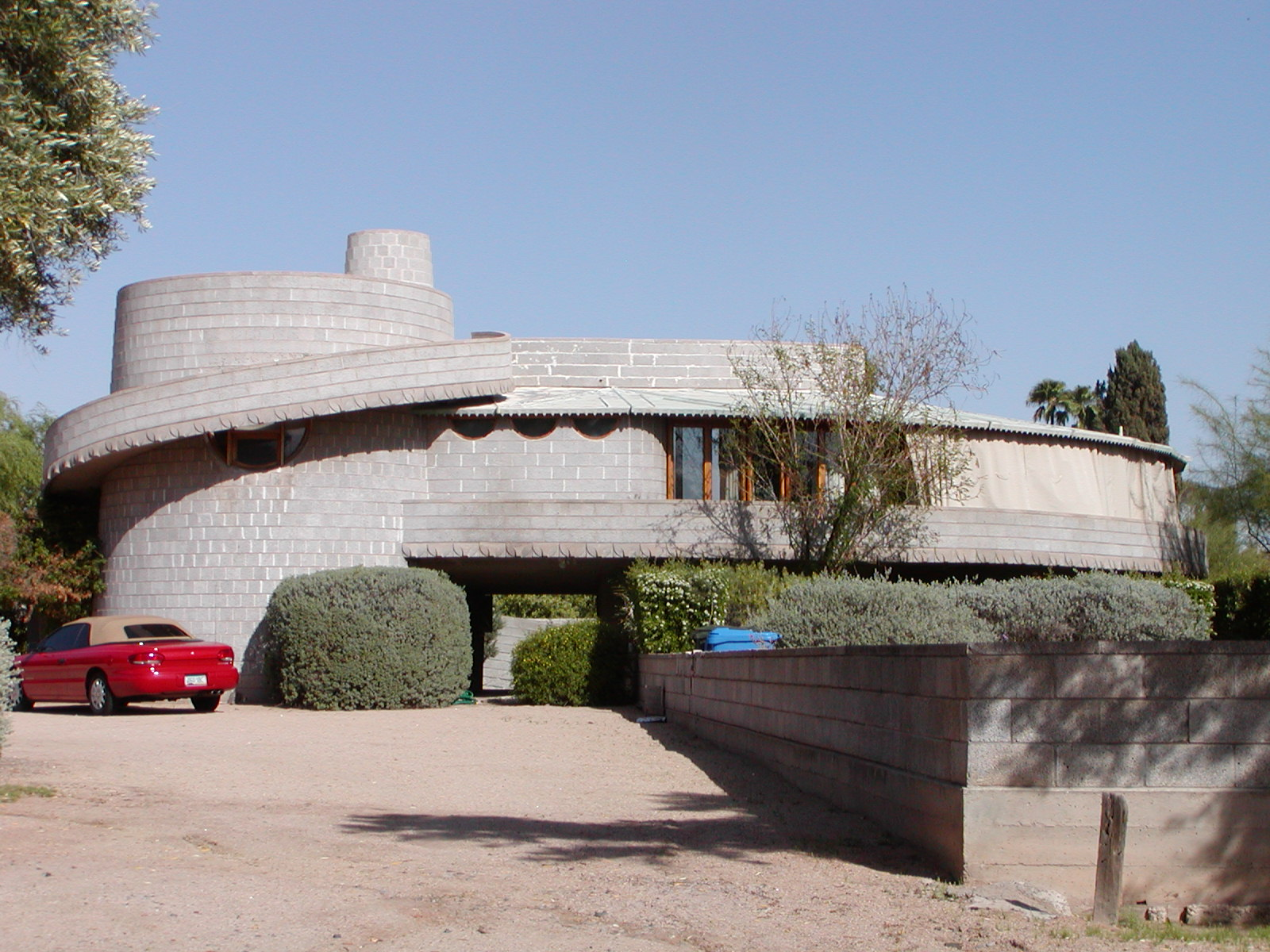
- The house as seen from Rubicon Avenue
- Interactive map of David and Gladys Wright House
- Location: 5212 East Exeter Boulevard (4505 North Rubicon Avenue), Phoenix, Arizona, U.S.
- Coordinates: 33°30′05″N 111°58′09″W
- Built: 1950–1952
- Architect: Frank Lloyd Wright
- Architectural style: Organic architecture
- NRHP reference No.: 100007156
- Added to NRHP: January 28, 2022

The David and Gladys Wright House is a residence at 5212 East Exeter Boulevard in the Arcadia neighborhood of Phoenix, Arizona, United States. Designed by Frank Lloyd Wright in an organic style for his son David and daughter-in-law Gladys, it was built from 1950 to 1952. By the 2010s, the house was one of four remaining buildings designed by Frank Lloyd Wright in Phoenix and one of nine such buildings in Arizona. The main house is listed on the National Register of Historic Places. The site also contains a small guesthouse to the northeast.

The main house is a curved structure made of concrete and sits on seven piers; it is accessed by a spiraling ramp. The house has 2,553 square feet (237.2 m^{2}) of space, with three bedrooms and four bathrooms, and is made of concrete blocks and mahogany boards. The house forms a 270-degree arc around an interior courtyard, with a kitchen to the northeast, a living room to the southwest, and bedrooms to the southeast. The interior uses circular motifs and geometric shapes, in addition to furnishings designed by Wright, such as a carpet. The guesthouse is built of similar materials to the main house but is much smaller, with one primary room.

David Wright and his wife Gladys acquired land for the house in 1950 and 1951. After the building's completion, the couple initially invited guests, though they had stopped doing so by the 1960s. The couple continued to live in the house until their respective deaths. After Gladys died in 2008, her granddaughters sold the house the next year to a limited partnership, JT Morning Glory Enterprises. The new owner canceled a planned renovation of the house, instead reselling it in June 2012 to the real-estate development firm 8081 Meridian, who planned to demolish and redevelop it. Following efforts to preserve the house as a landmark, it was sold to Zach Rawling in December 2012. Rawling attempted to repurpose the house as a museum and cultural center before trying to donate it to the School of Architecture at Taliesin, though neither plan was carried out. After Benson Botsford LLC bought the house in August 2020, the family of Bing Hu and Wenchin Shi moved into the residence, renovating it.

== Description ==
The house was designed by the American architect Frank Lloyd Wright and built for the architect's fourth child David, along with David's wife Gladys. It is located at 5212 East Exeter Boulevard, with an alternate address of 4505 North Rubicon Avenue, in the Arcadia neighborhood of Phoenix, Arizona, United States. The site covers either 5.6 acres (2.3 ha) or 5.9 acres (2.4 ha). There is a detached single-story guesthouse to the northeast. The surrounding area includes detached ranch homes, some of which have been replaced with newer mansions. These include a house to the south, designed by Wright's eldest son Lloyd Wright. Prior to the development of the David and Gladys Wright House, the land had been part of block H within the politically separate subdivision of Arcadia. The site was among hundreds that were created in 1919 when Arcadia was platted out into multiple land lots.

By 2012, the house was one of four remaining buildings designed by Frank Lloyd Wright in Phoenix and one of nine such buildings in Arizona. The house is also one of two that Wright designed for his children, the other being the Robert Llewellyn Wright House in Bethesda, Maryland. An example of organic architecture, the David and Gladys Wright House has a circular plan. The house uses numerous design elements seen in Wright's other buildings; for instance, Wright used natural materials from the surrounding area, arranged the living room around a central hearth, and used geometric motifs inside. The house wraps around an interior courtyard that originally had an almond-shaped pool and bougainvillea flowers, though the pool has since been infilled.

=== Main house ===
==== Exterior ====
The house is raised on seven piers, which are made of curved concrete blocks. At the time of construction, the area was full of orange trees, and Wright wanted his son and daughter-in-law to be able to see above the trees. The pier design allowed breezes to pass through the building as well. The rooms themselves are placed on a concrete slab that is cantilevered above the piers. Circular columns carry the roof above the cantilevered floor slabs. The exterior of this floor slab is decorated with a cast-concrete frieze. The frieze contains scalloped patterns, which was cast using aluminum formwork. The decorations are similar to those used at the Arizona Biltmore Hotel and at several houses in Greater Los Angeles. The house's outer wall forms a circular arc with a 77-foot (23 m) radius.

The facade is mostly composed of rectangular concrete blocks, which are hollow and are filled with pumice. To create the impression of a curved facade, rounded blocks were used for the piers, and smaller blocks were used in walls with sharp curves. Wright left gaps in between the blocks to create contrasting light and dark patterns, and he applied silicone-based paint onto the concrete for waterproofing. Glazed window panes are used as well; these windows are flat, contrasting with the rest of the facade. There is a circular window just outside the kitchen, which is similar to those in Wright buildings such as the Marin County Civic Center, Gammage Memorial Auditorium, and Solomon R. Guggenheim Museum. To take advantage of natural light, there are floor-to-ceiling windows on the southern wall of the master bedroom and living room. The other windows have miters to give the impression of invisible corners.

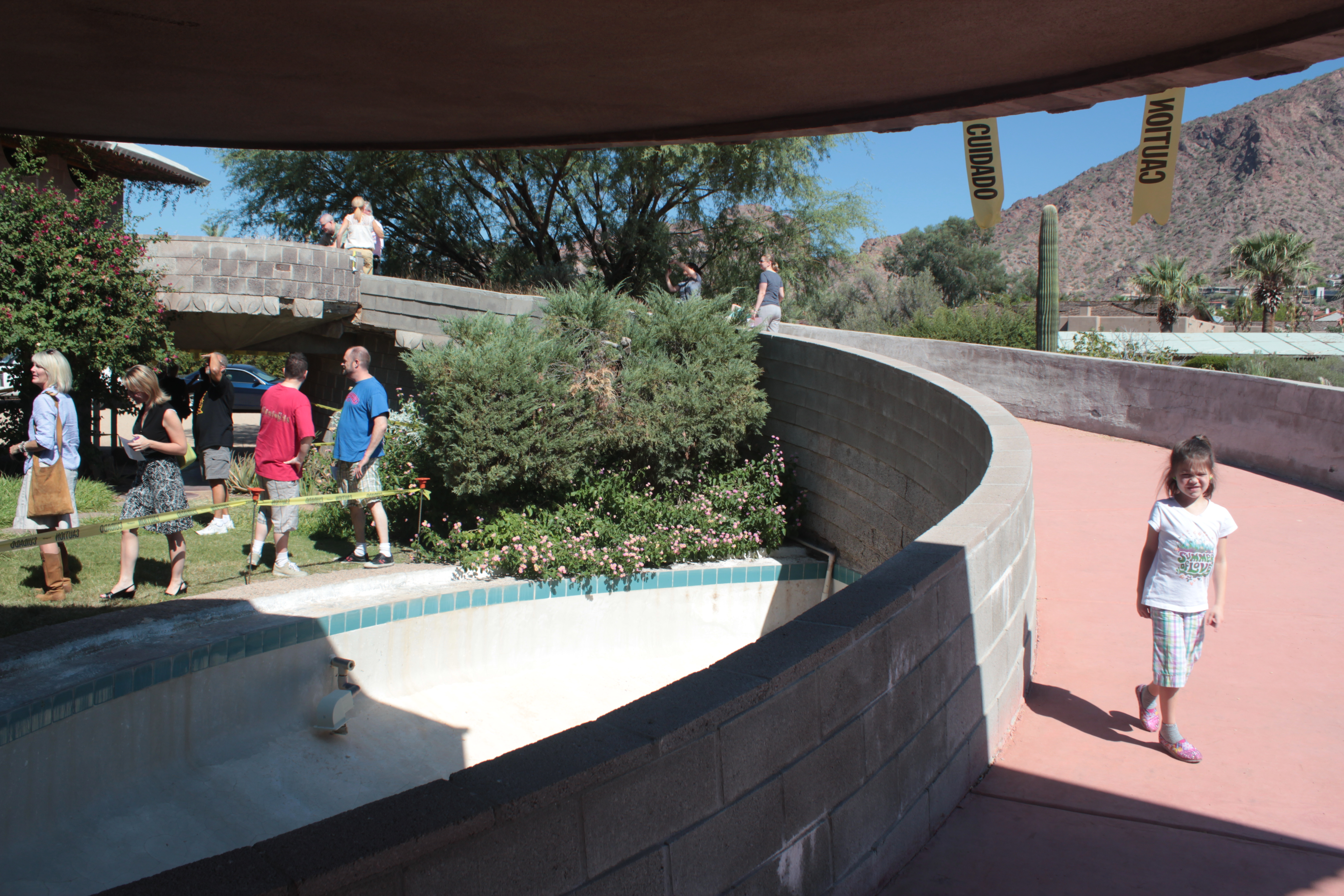
View of the ramp

A ramp ascends counterclockwise from an entry courtyard at the northeast to the front door at the house's southwest corner. Though there are claims that the spiral ramp predated the design of the Solomon R. Guggenheim Museum in New York, Wright had designed buildings with spiral ramps as early as the 1920s. The David and Gladys Wright House and the Guggenheim Museum are two of three extant Wright structures with spiral designs, the other being the V. C. Morris Gift Shop in San Francisco. Just outside the front entrance, a second ramp ascends from the main floor to the roof deck. Wright wanted his son and daughter-in-law to be able to observe the nearby desert and Camelback Mountain from the roof. The rest of the roof is painted turquoise and has diagonal seams.

==== Interior ====
The house covers 2,553 square feet (237.2 m^{2}), with three bedrooms and four bathrooms. The main floor forms a 270-degree arc around the courtyard; it is divided into modules, each of which cover 10 degrees of the arc. Each room occupies nearly the entire width of the house. There are smaller spaces leading to larger rooms, an example of the compression-and-release principle that Wright espoused. According to House & Home magazine, the house contained "literally no 90° angle" because all the rooms are curved. The floors and walls are made of concrete, and many of the furnishings are made of Philippine mahogany. The interior spaces have mahogany-board ceilings, doors, and window frames. The interior uses circular motifs, in addition to geometric shapes including squares and hexagons. When the Wrights lived there, the house had recessed ceiling lamps, which David rarely used. Instead, the house was illuminated by natural light during the daytime and exterior floodlights at night. From the outset, the house also had a built-in air conditioning system.

The layout, described by House & Home as an "in-line plan", consists of rooms arranged in succession, similarly to Wright's other designs such as the Lloyd Lewis House. Just inside the entrance is a coat closet. Next to it is a cylindrical kitchen, a double-height space occupying the northwestern portion of the arc. The circular living room occupies the center (southwestern corner) of the arc. The living room features a conical fireplace, described by The Arizona Republic as resembling a Native American kiva. There is a dining niche at one end of the living room, next to the kitchen and living room fireplace. A hallway, along the inner portion of the arc, connects the living room to the bathrooms and bedrooms. The southeastern portion of the house contains the bedrooms, with the master bedroom cantilevered off the end of the arc. The house has three bedrooms in total, all of which face outward. The master bedroom has an attached en-suite bathroom and a conical fireplace. The two other bedrooms share a bathroom which also faces outward. All of the rooms have views of both the interior courtyard and the exterior landscaping.

Wright designed many of the furnishings. For example, he designed a carpet with a "March balloons" pattern, consisting of colorful circular motifs, for the living room. The original carpet was manufactured by a Puerto Rican firm based on a 1926 design; a reproduction was installed after the original carpet was sold off. Though not designed by Wright, the living room also had a grand piano, which was later moved to the Frank Lloyd Wright Home and Studio in Oak Park, Illinois. Wright was also responsible for the design of the dining room's round table, the house's chairs, and the bedside desk in David's master bedroom. Built-in furniture of red Philippine mahogany is installed throughout the house. During his lifetime, David left many of his father's original decorative details intact, down to such items as the custom-made garbage cans.

=== Guesthouse ===
The guesthouse, designed by John Howe, is built of similar materials to the main house. The roofline slopes up from south to north, toward Camelback Mountain. The rectangular floor plan consists of a bedroom that doubles as living and dining space, in addition to a kitchenette and a bathroom. To conserve space, the guest house incorporates various pieces of built-in furniture, including a sofa bed. The interior has mahogany window frames, ceilings, and doors, in addition to a cylindrical fireplace. There is a carport and storage rooms at the guesthouse's western end. Sources disagree over whether the guesthouse has 260 square feet (24 m^{2}), 350 square feet (33 m^{2}), or 360 square feet (33 m^{2}). Because it was hidden in a citrus grove, the guesthouse remained little-known into the 21st century.

== History ==
=== Wright ownership ===
==== Development ====
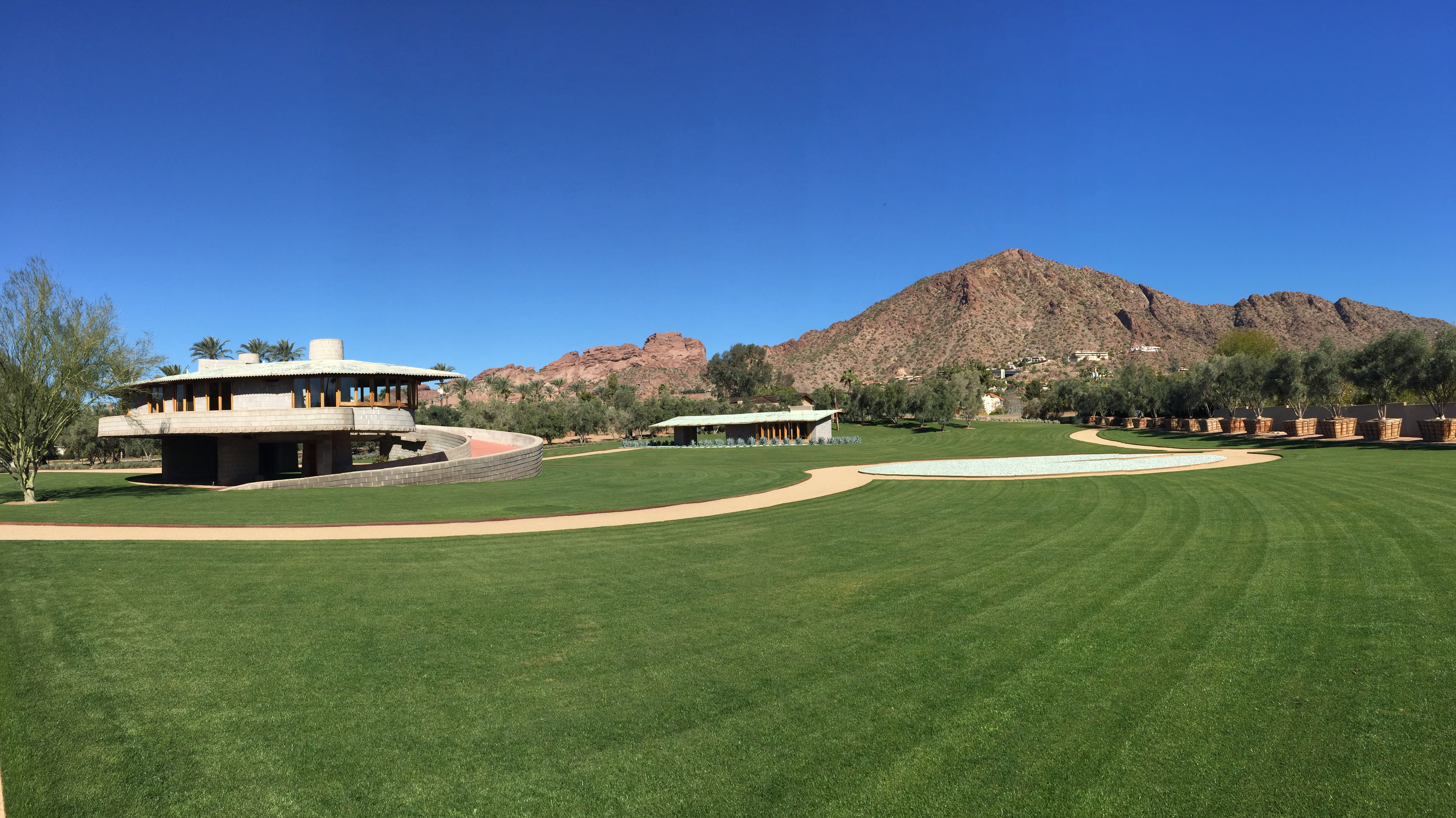
House and grounds

In 1950, Frank Lloyd Wright began drawing up plans for a house to be occupied by his son David and daughter-in law Gladys. David had asked his father to design the house after realizing that none of his six siblings had asked their father to design their houses. According to Wright's archivist Bruce Brooks Pfeiffer, the architect drew up preliminary plans for the building on a blank sheet of paper at his office in Taliesin West, spending at most one hour on these drawings. The drawings for the house were originally titled "How to Live in the Southwest", which were adapted from a generic design. That May, David and Gladys bought a site in Arcadia, lot 7, from the Patrick family. The Wrights bought an adjacent parcel, lot 8, from the Patricks in January 1951. This allowed the site to be accessed both from the west on Rubicon Avenue and from the south on Exeter Boulevard.

The engineering drawings had been finished by February 1951. David, a concrete machinery salesman by trade, was the general contractor for his own house. Gordon Chadwick was hired as the construction supervisor, while Ray Parrish was the foreman for the project; both had formerly apprenticed under Frank. The original proposal called for four bedrooms, later downsized to three. The residence was also supposed to be made of wood, but David requested that it instead be made of concrete. At the time, concrete was not commonly used as a construction material in residences. Furthermore, David specified that only his company could make the concrete blocks that were used in the house's construction.

During the house's construction, David modified several elements of the design, such as the master bedroom's entrance. By June 1951, David indicated that the foundations and piers had been constructed and that he was looking for a cabinet manufacturer. Relations between David and Parrish had deteriorated by that October, when Frank sent his apprentice William Wesley Peters to mediate the disagreements and oversee the house's completion. Although Frank had wanted to pour the concrete in place, it was Peters who suggested that the building instead be constructed of concrete blocks, with rooms cantilevered from the structure. Further issues arose from the fact that David was having trouble finding a new foreman and a new carpenter; the first carpenter could not climb ladders because he had arthritis. That October, Peters revised the plans to fit David's needs. Only one of David's proposed changes—which involved raising the house's floor slab—could not be carried out, so Peters instead elected to lower the height of the garden under it.

==== Usage ====
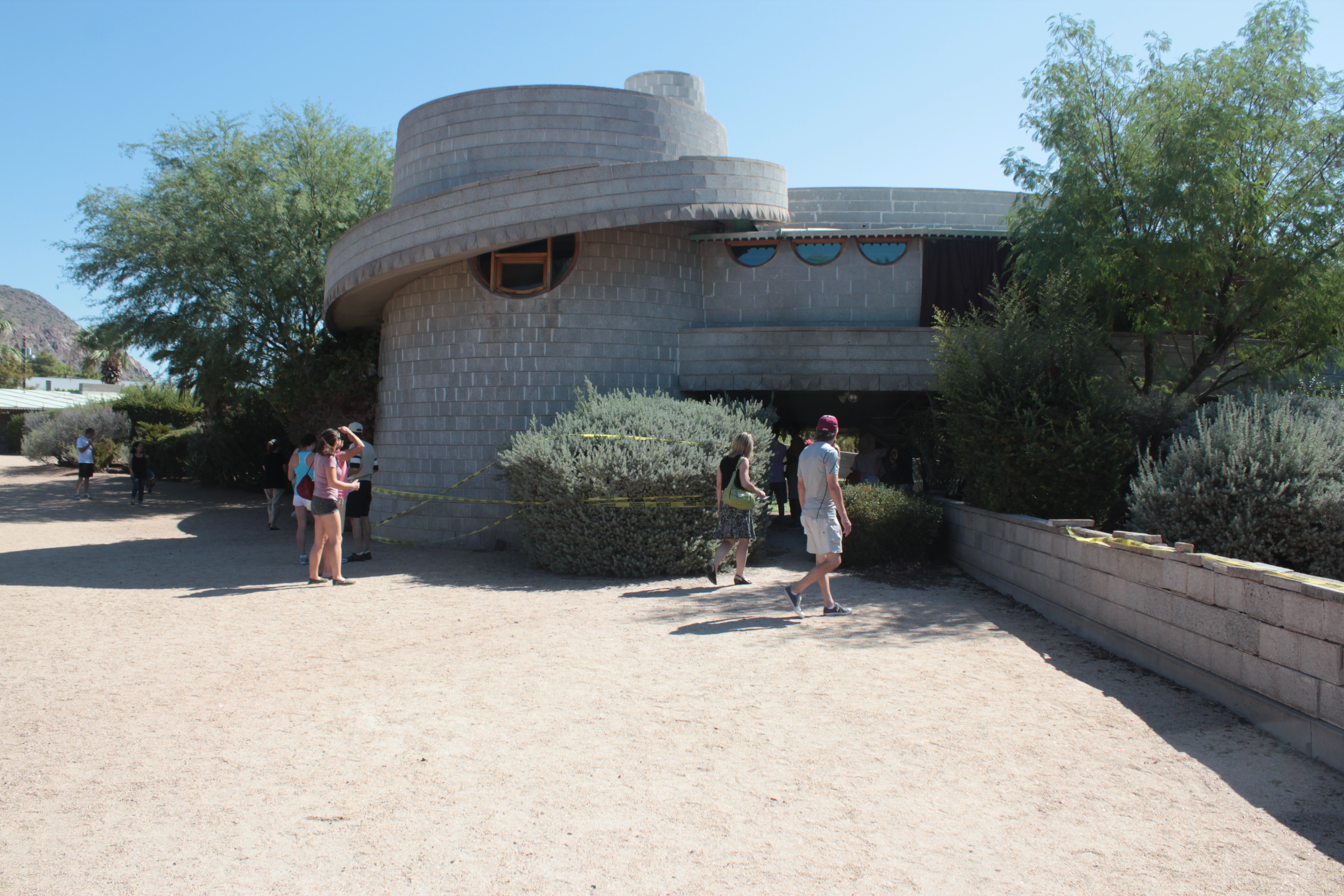
Side view of the house. In the center is the ramp from the main floor to the roof.

The residence was finished by May 1952. Gladys wrote in her diary that the house frequently leaked, a common occurrence in Frank's buildings. The guesthouse was built in 1954, and the house sometimes hosted visiting architects in its earliest years. David and Gladys kept a leather-bound guestbook for visitors from Japan and from Frank's Wisconsin studio, Taliesin. In addition, they entertained family members such as their actress niece Anne Baxter. Over the years, the Wrights kept the original design intact, except for the addition of insulation. The house was originally located in the politically separate subdivision of Arcadia, which became part of the city of Phoenix in 1961.

The surrounding land was sold off between 1968 and 1970, and the estate decreased in size from 10 to 2 acres (4.05 to 0.81 ha) as a result. David and Gladys sold the southeastern part of lot 8 to their son David in 1968, and they sold all of lot 7 to the Sipe family in 1969. The year afterward, the Stiteler family bought the southwestern part of lot 8, leaving the Wrights with just the northern half of lot 8. By the 1960s, the family had stopped inviting guests. The family stopped tourists from going into their citrus grove, and they asked bus drivers not to use their driveway. In a 1979 news article, the elder David recalled that the house "brings us publicity. And that I don't like." Due to the Wrights' aversion to publicity, the house fell into obscurity, and outsiders assumed that the house had become dilapidated.

Even though David and Gladys Wright's granddaughter grew up in a neighboring house, David still required his granddaughters to make appointments when they visited. In addition, David did not allow his granddaughters to go past the living room, and Gladys required them to wear bathing caps when they swam in the pool. David and Gladys lived in their house for the rest of their lives; David died in 1997 at the age of 102, and Gladys died in 2008 at age 104. According to a Wright family member, the family had never considered applying for a historic-landmark designation for the building, which would have temporarily protected it from demolition.

=== JT Morning ownership ===
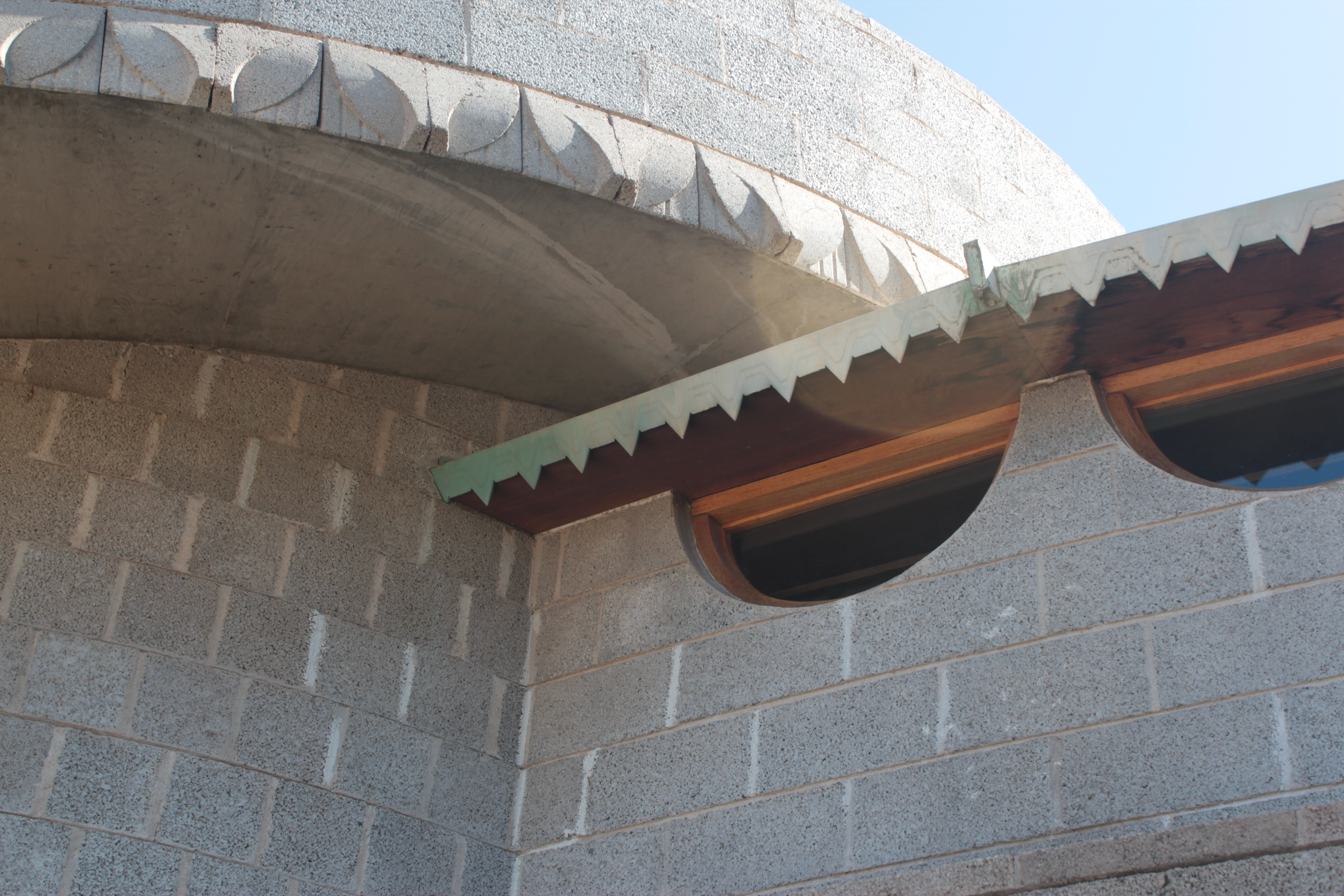
Detail of exterior wall

Gladys bequeathed the house to her three granddaughters, one of whom wanted to sell the house. Her two sisters, who had no money to buy out her stake in the house, agreed to the sale, listing it at an asking price of $3.99 million. At the time, many of the house's original objects, such as letters from Frank and a toilet-seat cover owned by Gladys, remained in place. JT Morning Glory Enterprises, a limited partnership composed of Carolyn and Spencer Russell and Jean Tichenor, bought the house in 2009 for about $2.8 million. Anne Wright-Levi, one of David and Gladys's granddaughters, said that the family could no longer afford to pay for the house's upkeep.

Tichenor wanted to renovate the house for use as a personal residence. The Wright family sold the March balloons carpet, which was acquired in 2010 by the film producer Joel Silver. The Russells and Tichenor ultimately never renovated the house; a real-estate agent said the owners had a "change of life plans".

=== 8081 Meridian ownership ===
In June 2012, the property was resold to Steve Sells and John Hoffman of real-estate firm 8081 Meridian for $1.8 million. 8081 Meridian planned to demolish the house and split the site in half. At the time, the house needed approximately $300,000 in repairs, and NPR reported that the house was surrounded by chain-link fencing and that the site had become overgrown. 8081 Meridian claimed that they did not know about the house's history when they announced their plans. When the Frank Lloyd Wright Building Conservancy learned about the redevelopment plans, it launched a petition in favor of the house's preservation, obtaining 30,000 signatures. Phoenix mayor Greg Stanton was among those who supported the house's preservation. After the conservancy started its petition, Hoffman and Sells agreed to discuss the possibility of preserving the house, but the owners subsequently expressed opposition to the designation. By that July, the Phoenix Planning Commission had agreed to host hearings on designating the building as a landmark. If the designation were successful, the building could not be demolished for three years.

8081 Meridian threatened to sue the city, claiming that the designation was illegal and would reduce the property's value. The firm received a demolition permit in September 2012; had the building been razed, it would have been the first Wright–designed structure in four decades to be intentionally demolished. The owners also hired the landscaper Alexander Malatesta to demolish the house, but Malatesta hesitated once he saw the building itself, instead contacting Phoenix city officials. The demolition permit was rescinded that October because, in Phoenix, buildings under consideration for municipal-landmark status could not be demolished. Police officers were stationed outside the house to prevent its demolition. Three municipal agencies supported the historic designation. The house needed to meet only one criterion to be eligible for the designation, and the city's Historic Preservation Commission found that the house met three such criteria. Despite this, the Phoenix City Council twice postponed a vote on designating the house as a city landmark.

The Wright Building Conservancy wanted to identify a buyer for the house before the city council voted on the designation. The house was thus placed on sale for $2.379 million. Several unidentified buyers, including an actor and an architect, reportedly were interested in the site. One prospective buyer submitted three bids for the house in mid-2012, all of which were rejected. Hoffman wanted to resell the building for at least $2.2 million, but this buyer had offered only $2 million. Another potential buyer agreed to buy the house in November 2012. The buyer withdrew their bid shortly afterward, as they wanted to stay anonymous, which would not be possible if the house continued to attract visitors. The conservancy also considered having several buyers take joint ownership of the house. In addition, the City Council passed legislation that allowed structures with historic designations to be opened to the public with a permit, which would allow the Wrights' house to be saved.

=== Rawling ownership ===
The house was resold in December 2012 to an anonymous buyer, which was initially reported as a Delaware limited liability company. Zach Rawling, a residential developer and lawyer, was later reported as the real owner; he had been interested in Wright's architecture since he was a child. Rawling later recalled that he had become involved after hearing about the demolition permit.

==== Proposed conversion into museum ====
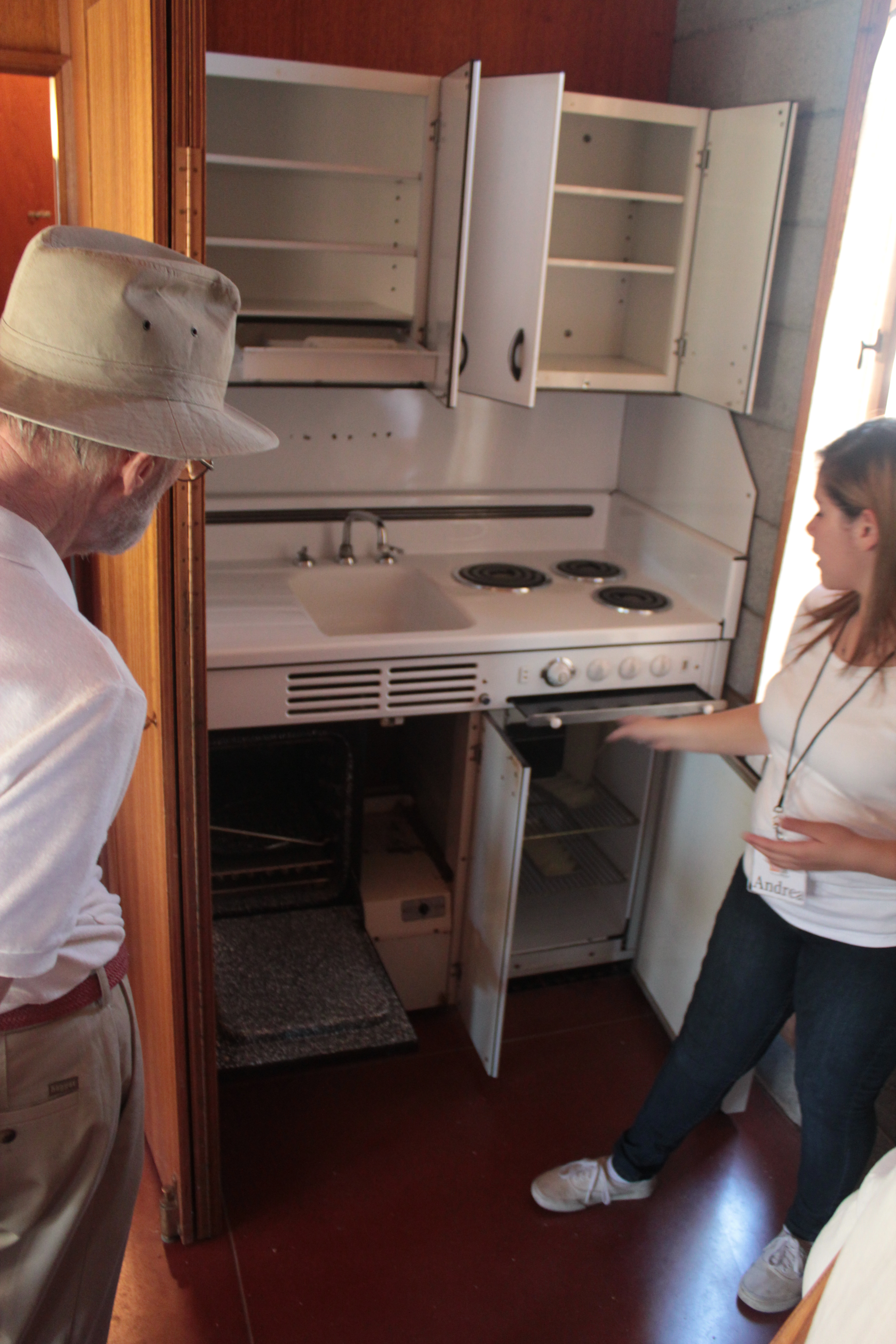
The house's interior

After Rawling acquired the house, he wanted to convert the David and Gladys Wright House into a museum. He anticipated that the house could attract more than 100,000 annual visitors, a similar number to that of Taliesin West in nearby Scottsdale. Rawling obtained three neighboring homes and demolished them, intending to create an entrance from the north. In addition, Rawling reinforced the walls and replanted 100 olive trees. In an interview with USA Today, Rawling denied that he wanted to live in the home himself. By 2014, Rawling had applied for a historical designation for the house, though he had not yet opened it to the public. In early 2015, Rawling requested a permit from the Phoenix city government to begin hosting tours and events at the house. He formed the David and Gladys Wright House Foundation, which hosted limited tours for small groups starting that April. The same year, Rawling invited David Wright's great-granddaughter Sarah Levi to live there and become the house's first artist in residence. Levi retained many of the original pieces of furniture and added a television. A replica of the original living room carpet was also added.

The David and Gladys Wright House Foundation hired Organic Architecture Inc. and several architecture firms to create a master plan for the house. The plans included a museum and education center, in addition to a restoration of the original house. The 25,000-square-foot (2,300 m^{2}) visitor center would have been placed underground, and there would have been paths and a pool above it. If the permit were approved, Rawling could host events and weddings at the house, and he would be able to invite artists-in-residence and overnight guests. To alleviate concerns, Rawling proposed restricting events to no more than 500 people, and these events would be required to end at 10 p.m. Some of his neighbors opposed the permit because they worried it would create noise and vehicular traffic, and they claimed that the house's events and tours violated the residential zoning of the site. Opponents, who included the businessman Peter Sperling, circulated petitions and flyers against the project.

Phoenix's Historic Preservation Commission voted in November 2015 to recommend that the Phoenix City Council designate the building and 3.67 acres (1.49 ha) of surrounding land as a city landmark. Rawling had wanted the commission to preserve a 6-acre (2.4 ha) area, which had included land that the Wrights had not owned. Some of Rawling's neighbors supported a less restrictive designation that would not allow the house to be turned into an event venue and museum. Rawling temporarily stopped hosting events and tours at the house in May 2016 so he could focus on its preservation. At the time, he was talking with several organizations, including Arizona State University (ASU), to gauge whether they were interested in jointly operating the house. ASU ultimately declined to operate the house, citing opposition from neighbors. Rawling also offered to donate the house to the Arizona Community Foundation. Also in 2016, the city government submitted a competing application to have the house designated as a landmark. The city withdrew its landmark-designation application that December, at Rawling's request.

==== Donation to the School of Architecture ====
On June 8, 2017, the 150th anniversary of Frank Lloyd Wright's birth, Rawling decided to donate the home to the School of Architecture at Taliesin, an architecture college headquartered at Taliesin West. In exchange, the college had to raise $7 million for an endowment fund by 2020. College officials planned to teach students at the house, who would help restore the building. The house's preservation architect, Victor Sidy, estimated that the renovation could cost up to $3 million. At the time of the announcement, the School of Architecture had hoped to move into the house by late 2017. Neighbors expressed concerns about the house's conversion into a school, and a lawyer for some of the neighbors said she had only heard of the proposal through the news. The guesthouse was renovated the same year for $100,000.

In June 2018, the agreement with the School of Architecture was canceled. Neighbors had expressed concerns that vehicular traffic would increase. Furthermore, the School of Architecture had been unable to raise the required endowment, as the college was trying to raise funding for other projects and could not commit to a definite timetable for the Wright house's fundraiser. Subsequently, the house was placed for sale that September for $12.9 million; the real estate listing also included the adjacent guesthouse. According to the real estate listing, the main house had undergone some upgrades but still needed electrical and structural work. By 2019, the asking price had been reduced to about $10 million.

=== Hu and Shi ownership ===
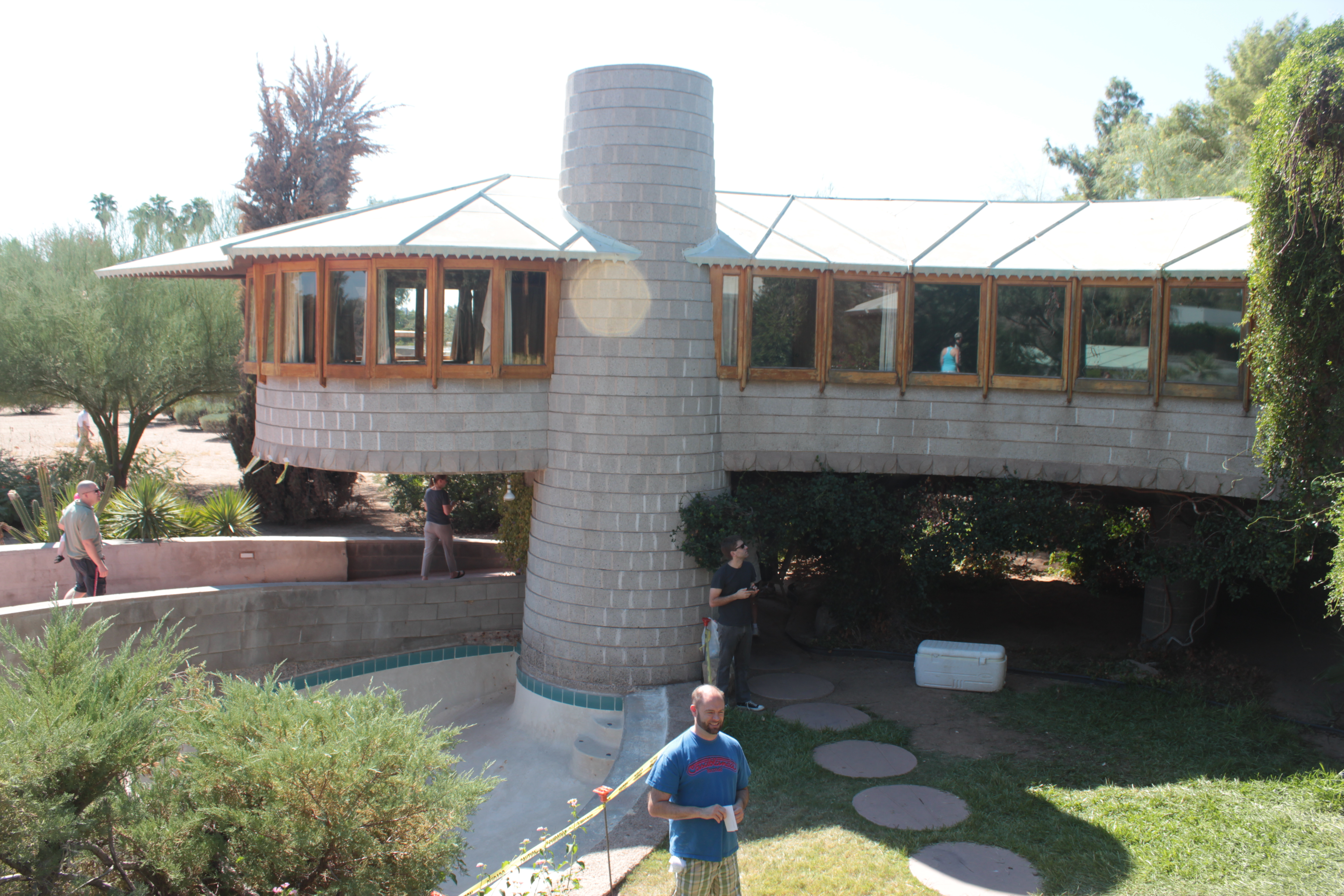
Closeup of windows

In August 2020, the David and Gladys Wright House was sold for $7.25 million to Benson Botsford LLC. The buyers included Jim Benson, a businessman, and Bing Hu, an architect who worked at Taliesin West as an apprentice; both men were on the board of the School of Architecture at Taliesin. Hu planned to move into the house with his wife Wenchin Shi and restore it. Hu and Shi's plans included installing a copper roof and constructing a few smaller mid-century modern houses on the site. In contrast to Rawling's proposal to convert the house into a cultural center, Hu and Shi wanted to use it as a private residence.

The house was listed on the National Register of Historic Places on January 28, 2022. Hu and his daughter Amanda helped renovate the structure. Due to leaks in the roof over the years, the wood had to be cleaned and reinstalled; furthermore, the wood used in the building was of a species no longer available for timber. The Hu family also found that, over the years, the previous owners had added several layers of foam insulation in an attempt to address the leaks. In 2023, after the renovation was completed, Amanda granted a preservation easement on the building to the Frank Lloyd Wright Building Conservancy. The home is not open to visitors as of 2023, since it is used as a private residence.

== Impact ==
Shortly after David and Gladys Wright's house was finished, in 1953, House & Home magazine wrote that the residence was the most widely-discussed of Wright's residential work since Fallingwater, and the magazine compared it to a Gila monster and a rattlesnake. Pedro E. Guerrero, who spent an entire day taking pictures for the House & Home article, was ejected from the property after he tried to adjust the Wrights' bougainvilleas for a photo shoot. In 1955, House Beautiful magazine published images of the house under the title "A Modern Castle in the Air", writing that the house signified Wright's design philosophy and his thoughts on residential living. Wright's archivist, Bruce Brooks Pfeiffer, described the wooden ceilings as "one of the most stunning examples of fine carpentry in modern architecture".

When the house was placed for sale in 2008, Peter Corbett of The Arizona Republic called it "a cultural treasure, a gem of the desert", at a time when gaudy mansions and the demolitions of existing buildings were commonplace in Phoenix. The scholar Neil Levine said, "I do consider the David and Gladys Wright house to be one of Wright's most significant and unusual buildings," and he characterized the structure as a "complete work of art". The New York Times called the David and Gladys Wright House "among Wright's most significant later works". Michael Kimmelman, The New York Times' architectural critic, described the house as "the Guggenheim's prodigal son", which had an air of grandeur in part because of its exterior ramp. Local architect Victor Sidy called the house "one of the last great masterworks of Frank Lloyd Wright". Thomas A. Payton of the School of Architecture at Taliesin regarded the building as one of Wright's best house designs. The historian Robert McCarter wrote that, in contrast to Wright's previous works, David and Gladys Wright's residence had "lost contact with the earth as the fundamental foundation for the act of building". A writer for Bloomberg compared the shape of the house to a snail's shell.

Drawings of the house were exhibited at the Phoenix Art Museum in 1990. David Wright's great-granddaughter Sarah Levi displayed photographs of the house at an art gallery in Phoenix in 2013, and Levi later wrote her master's degree thesis about the house.

== See also ==
- List of Frank Lloyd Wright works
- National Register of Historic Places listings in Phoenix, Arizona
