= Biltmore Area =

Neighborhood in Phoenix, Arizona

Coordinates: 33°31′01″N 112°01′30″W

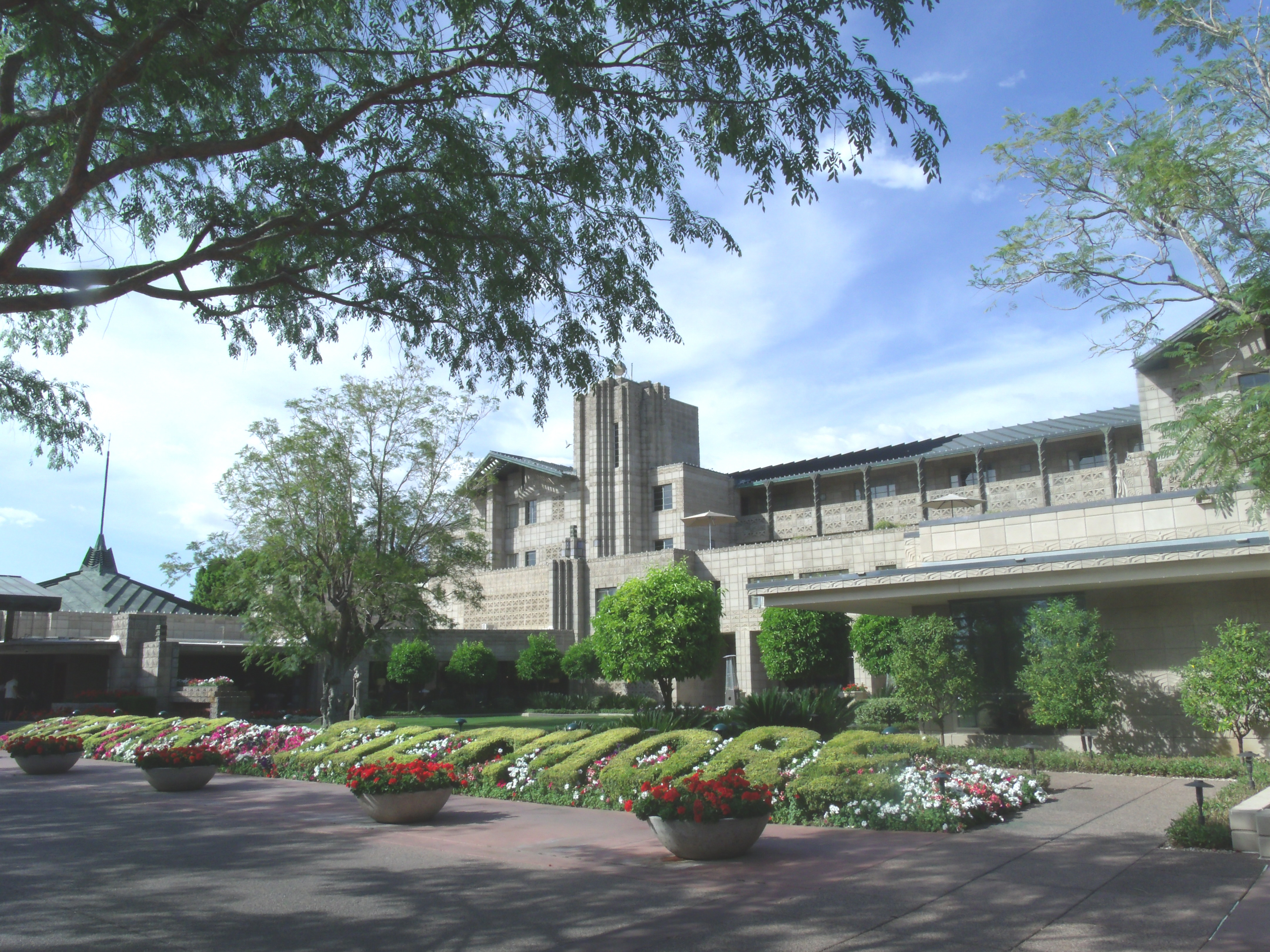
Arizona Biltmore

The Biltmore Area is an upscale residential neighborhood of Phoenix, Arizona. It is among the city's wealthiest neighborhoods, with a "posh" reputation. The Arizona Biltmore Hotel is in the area. Housing includes both condominiums as well as mansions and older homes. Plans for golf course expansion in the area in the late 2010s and 2020s encountered opposition from some neighborhood residents, prompting litigation.

== Landmarks ==
- Biltmore Fashion Park
- Norman Lykes House
- Wrigley Mansion

== See also ==
- North/Northwest Phoenix
