= House & Home =

Decorating and design magazine

House & Home magazine (also known as Canadian House & Home magazine) is a decorating, design and lifestyle publication that is published by the Toronto-based company House & Home Media.

The publication's title has a long history that goes back as far as 1952, although the magazine's current ownership, direction and subject matter commenced in 1986, when the publication was purchased by publisher Lynda Reeves and re-launched as the eponymous publication of the House & Home brand.

House & Home, The Magazine of Building (also styled House + Home) was originally a monthly architecture magazine published by Time Inc. from 1952 to 1964. The first issue was an offshoot of Architectural Forum and sent to 100,000 subscribers. The original editor and publisher was P.I. Prentice, and Douglas Haskell was editorial chairman. The illustrated monthly carried feature articles on home building, planning, and building materials. The magazine was sold to McGraw-Hill in 1964 and renamed Housing in 1978. That magazine merged with Builder magazine in 1982. Toronto, Canada - based interior designer Lynda Reeves purchased the magazine in 1986 and resurrected the original name. The magazine has a French language counterpart called Maison & Demeure.

House & Home is a registered trademark in Canada and the US, and has been used by House & Home Media on branded merchandise sold across Canada at the Bay, Home Outfitters and Zellers stores. The House & Home: Style for Living branded merchandise is currently sold across Canada at The TJX Companies Inc. stores such as Winners, Homesense and Marshalls. The House & Home brand has given rise to a website, Houseandhome.com, a retail shopping website, Shophouseandhome.com, and a television series, House & Home with Lynda Reeves, which was broadcast on CTV and GlobalTV before being distributed internationally.
