= Compression and expansion =

In architecture, compression and expansion or compression and release is a technique in which small, narrow and sometimes dark spaces lead to ones that are large and bright. For example, a narrow and dark hallway may lead up to a large auditorium with a high ceiling. The technique relies on contrast between the smaller and larger areas and causes people to believe the larger spaces are bigger than they actually are. Compression and release was named and popularised by Frank Lloyd Wright, although the technique predates him.
