= Golestan Palace =

Former official royal Qajar complex in Tehran, Iran

UNESCO World Heritage Site
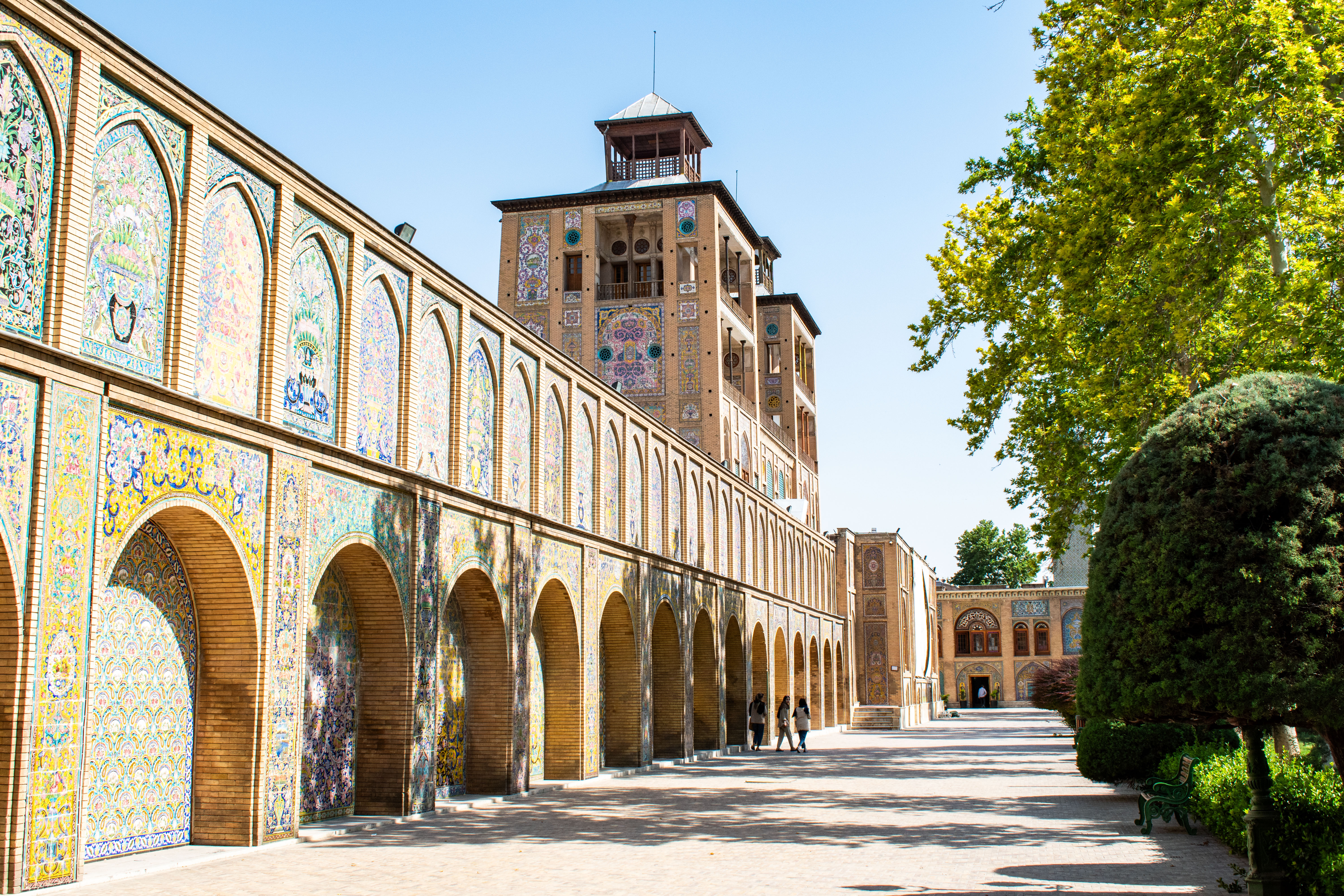
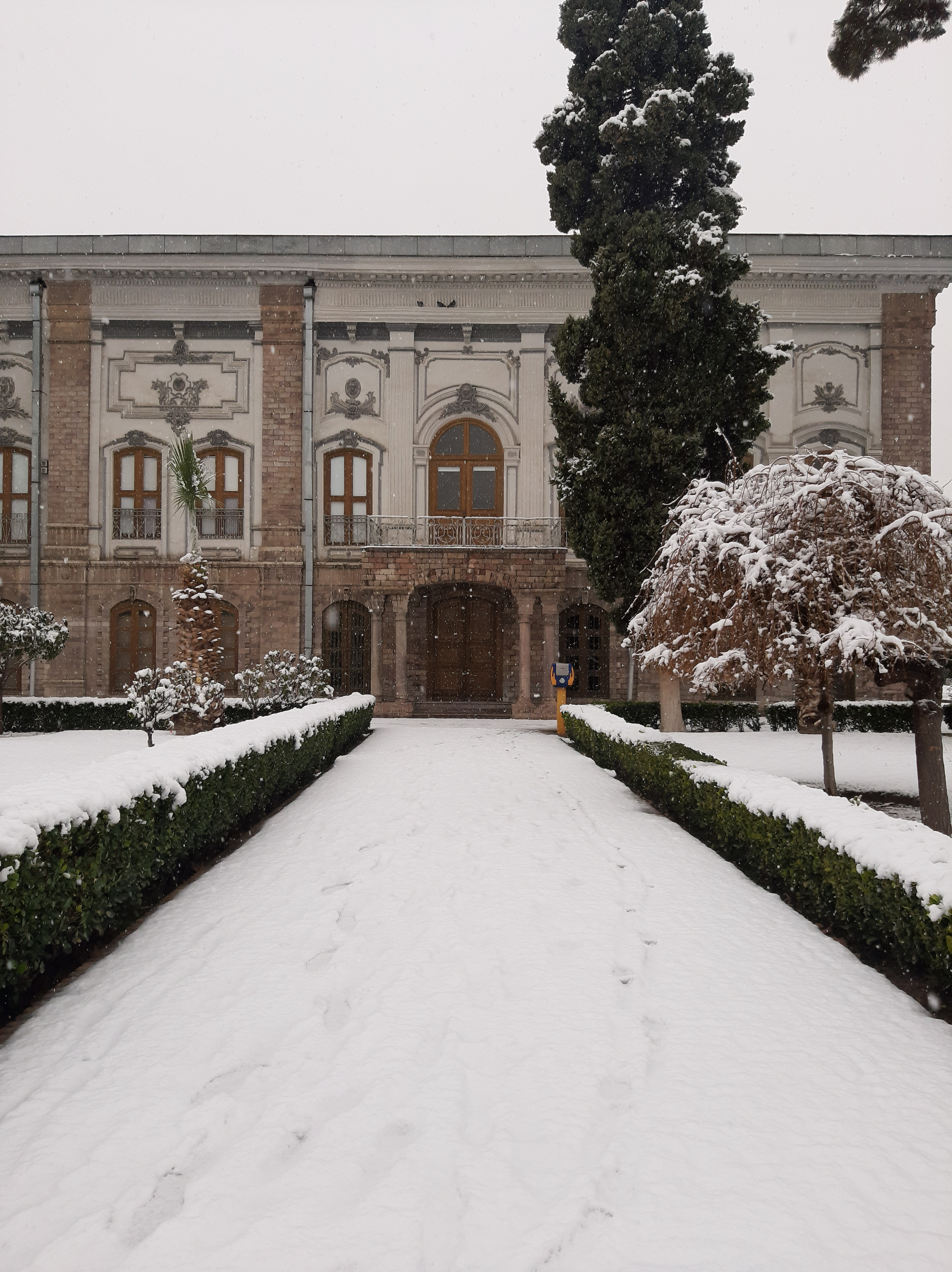
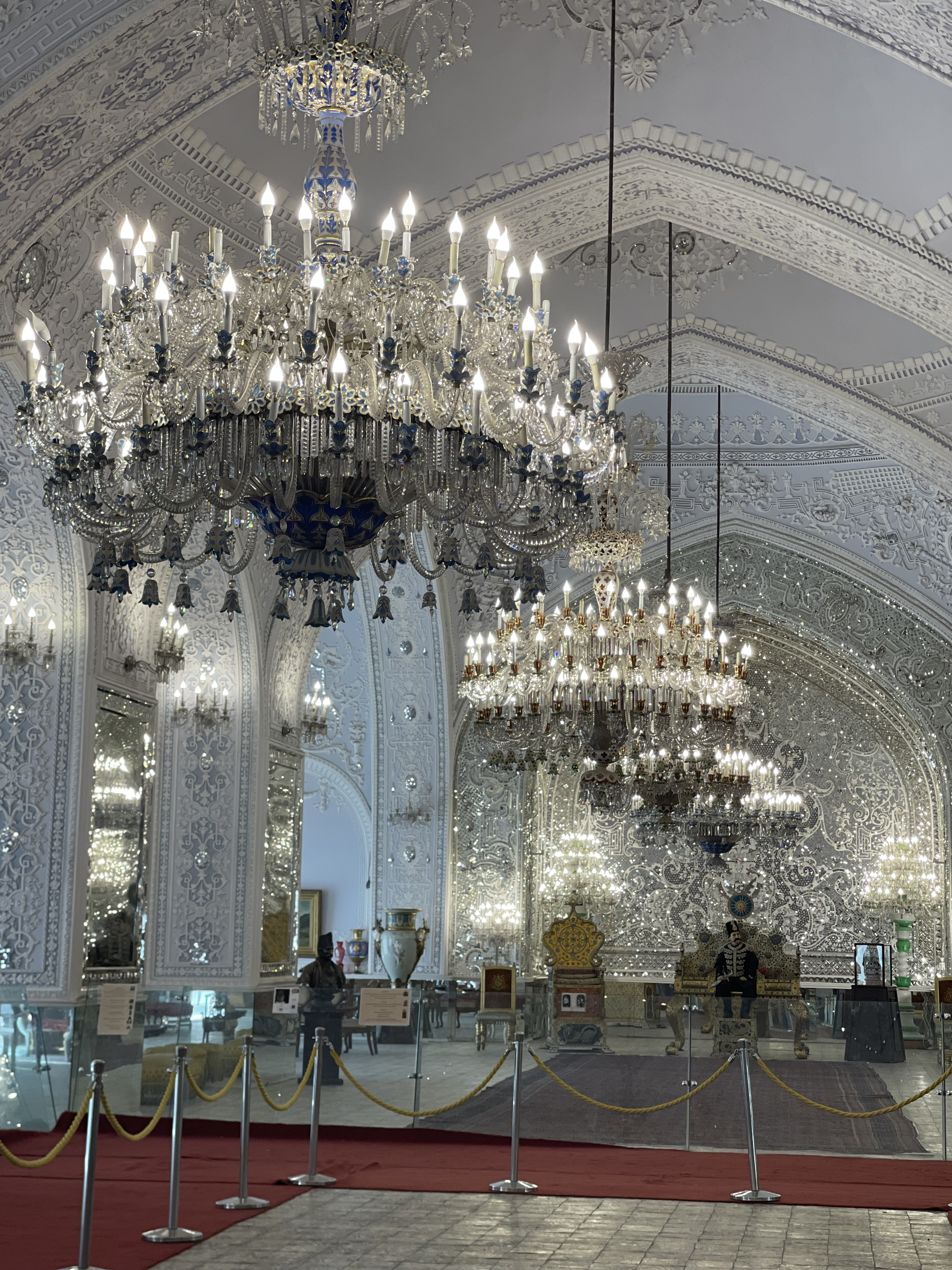
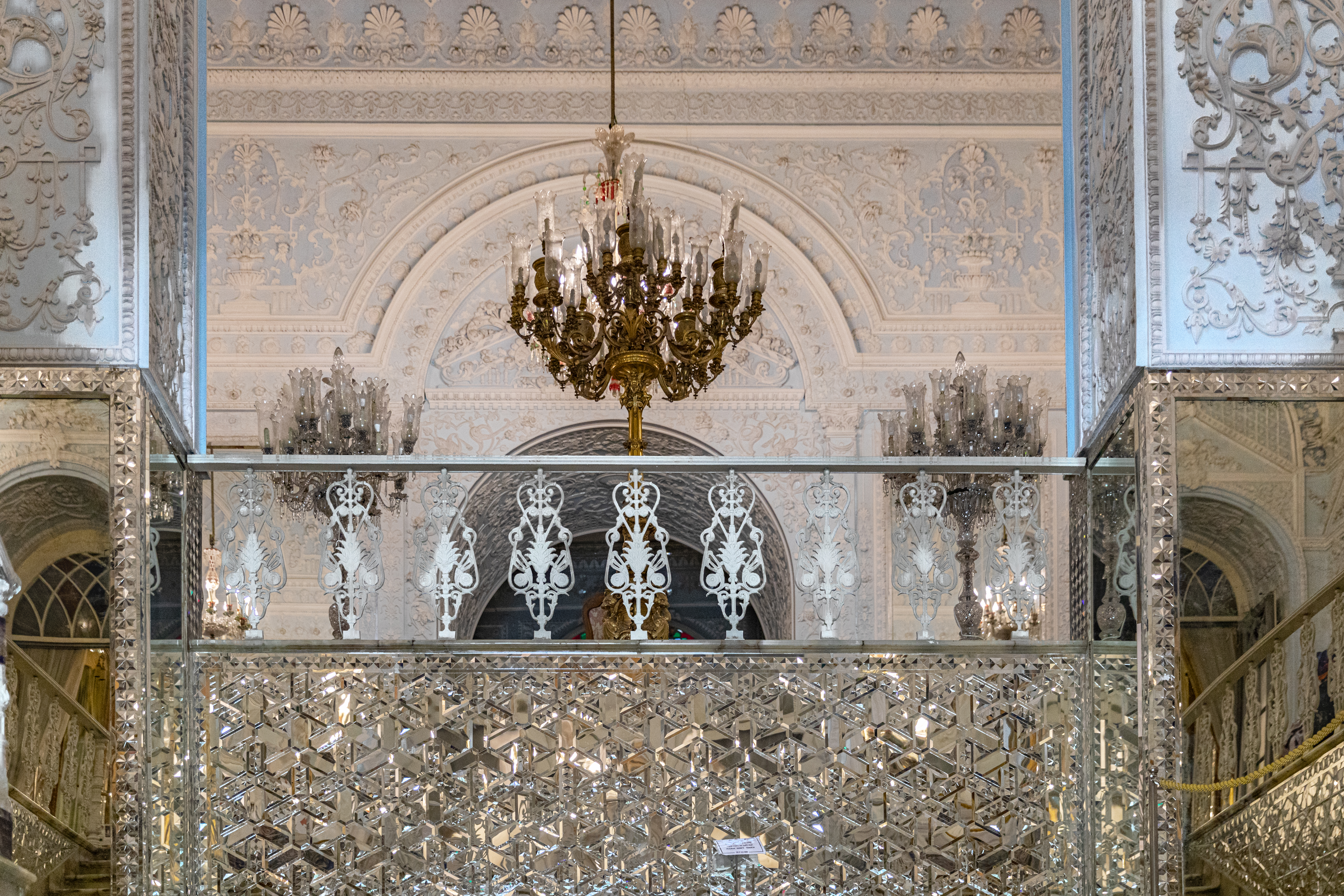

- Location within Tehran
- Interactive map of Golestan Palace
- Location: Tehran, Iran
- Criteria: Cultural: ii, iii, iv
- Reference: 1422
- Inscription: 2013 (37th Session)
- Area: 5.3 ha (13 acres)
- Buffer zone: 26.2 ha (65 acres)
- Coordinates: 35°40′47″N 51°25′13″E

The Golestan Palace (Persian: کاخ گلستان, romanized: Kākh-e Golestān) is the former official royal Qajar complex in Tehran, Iran. One of the oldest historic monuments in the capital and a UNESCO World Heritage Site, the Golestan Palace consists of a group of eight palatial royal structures surrounded by a wall, today used mainly as museums, surrounded by an outer wall, which were once enclosed within the defensive walls of Tehran's citadel. Most of the royal buildings date back to the 19th century and display a collection of Iranian and European crafts and gifts from the 18th to the 20th century.

== History ==
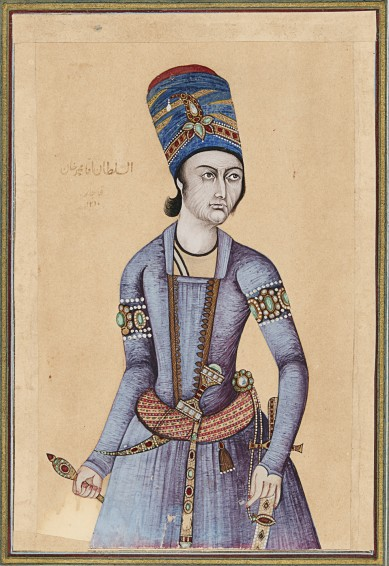
Contemporary portrait of Agha Mohammad Khan of the Qajar dynasty, 1795

The origin of the Tehran's royal citadel can be traced to 6 July 1404, when Ruy González de Clavijo, the envoy of Henry III of Castile, traveled to Samarkand to meet with Timur, the founder of the Timurid dynasty, and he chose to stay at the house of "Baba Sheikh", one of the elders of Tehran. It is believed that his house was located in the area of the royal citadel, which was later transformed by changes to the old buildings and the addition of new ones. The beginning of the royal citadel can be traced back to the time of Suleiman I (r. 1666–1694), with the construction of a palace in the Chenaristan area, a divan-khane where Soltan Hoseyn (r. 1694–1727) met with the Ottoman government's ambassador, Ahmad Dari Effendi, in the last year of his reign. Tehran's arg (citadel) was built during the reign of Tahmasp I (r. 1524–1576) of the Safavid dynasty (1502–1736). Abbas the Great built a large garden in the northern part of the fence, which was later surrounded by a high wall and buildings were built, with the royal residence was built inside it. At the end of the Safavid era, Tehran was sometimes the temporary seat of the Safavid shahs' court. The palace was later renovated by Karim Khan of the Zand dynasty (r. 1750–1779). Agha Mohammad Khan of the Qajar dynasty (1742–1797) chose Tehran as his capital. The arg became the seat of the Qajars (1794–1925) and the court and palace of Golestan became their official residence. The palace was rebuilt to its current form in 1865 by Haji Ab ol Hasan Mimar Navai.

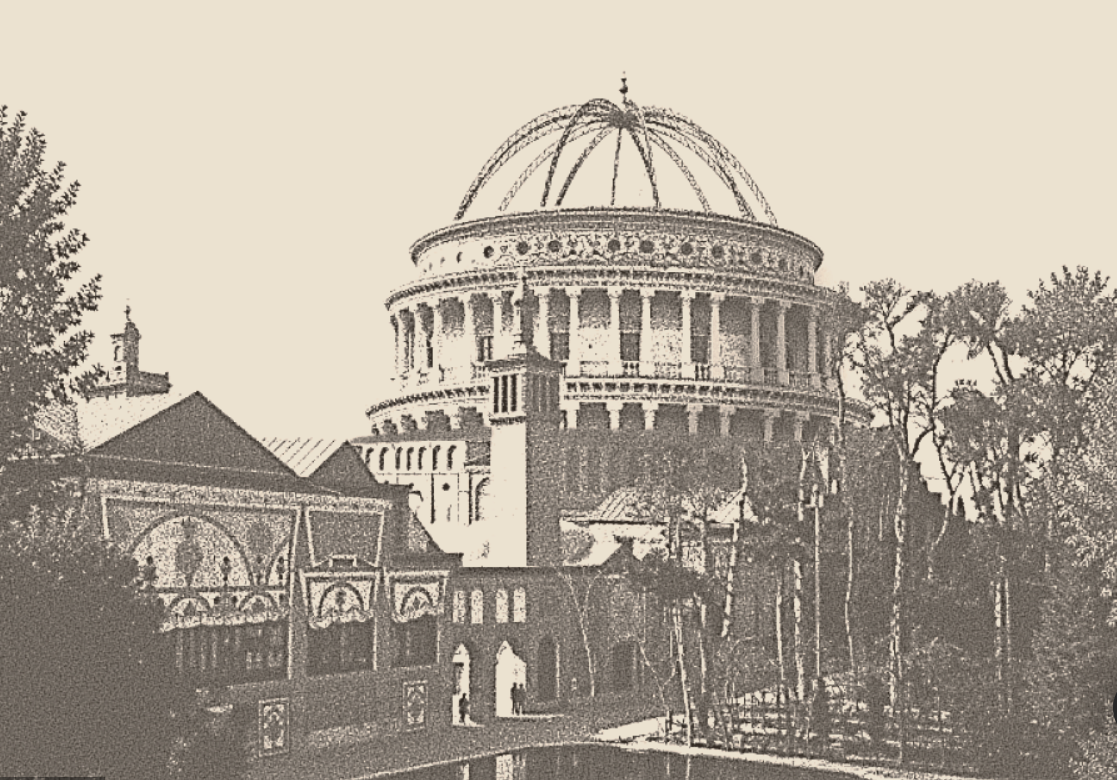
The Takyeh Dowlat, constructed in 1868 and demolished in 1946

During the Pahlavi era (1925–1979), the Golestan Palace was used for formal receptions. The Pahlavi dynasty built their own palaces in the Niavaran and Sa'dabad palace complexes. The most important ceremonies held in the palace during the Pahlavi era were the coronation of Reza Shah in 1926 and the coronation of Mohammad Reza Shah and Shahbanu Farah in 1967. Between 1925 and 1945, a large portion of the buildings of the complex were destroyed by the order of Reza Shah. He believed that historic Qajar palaces should not hinder the growth of a modern city. In the place of the old buildings, commercial buildings in the modern style of the 1950s and 1960s were erected.

In March 2026, during the 2026 Iran war, the palace suffered major damages when shockwaves and debris hit the complex damaging windows, doors and mirrors after an US-Israeli air strike targeting the nearby Arg Square, prompting UNESCO to express their concern regarding protection of historical sites.

== Sites ==
The Golestan Palace Complex consists of 17 structures, including palaces, museums, and halls. Almost all of this complex was built during the 131 year rule of the Qajar dynasty. These palaces were used for many occasions such as coronations and other important celebrations. It also consists of three main archives, including the photographic archive, the library of manuscripts, and the archive of documents.

=== Takht-e Marmar Iwan ===
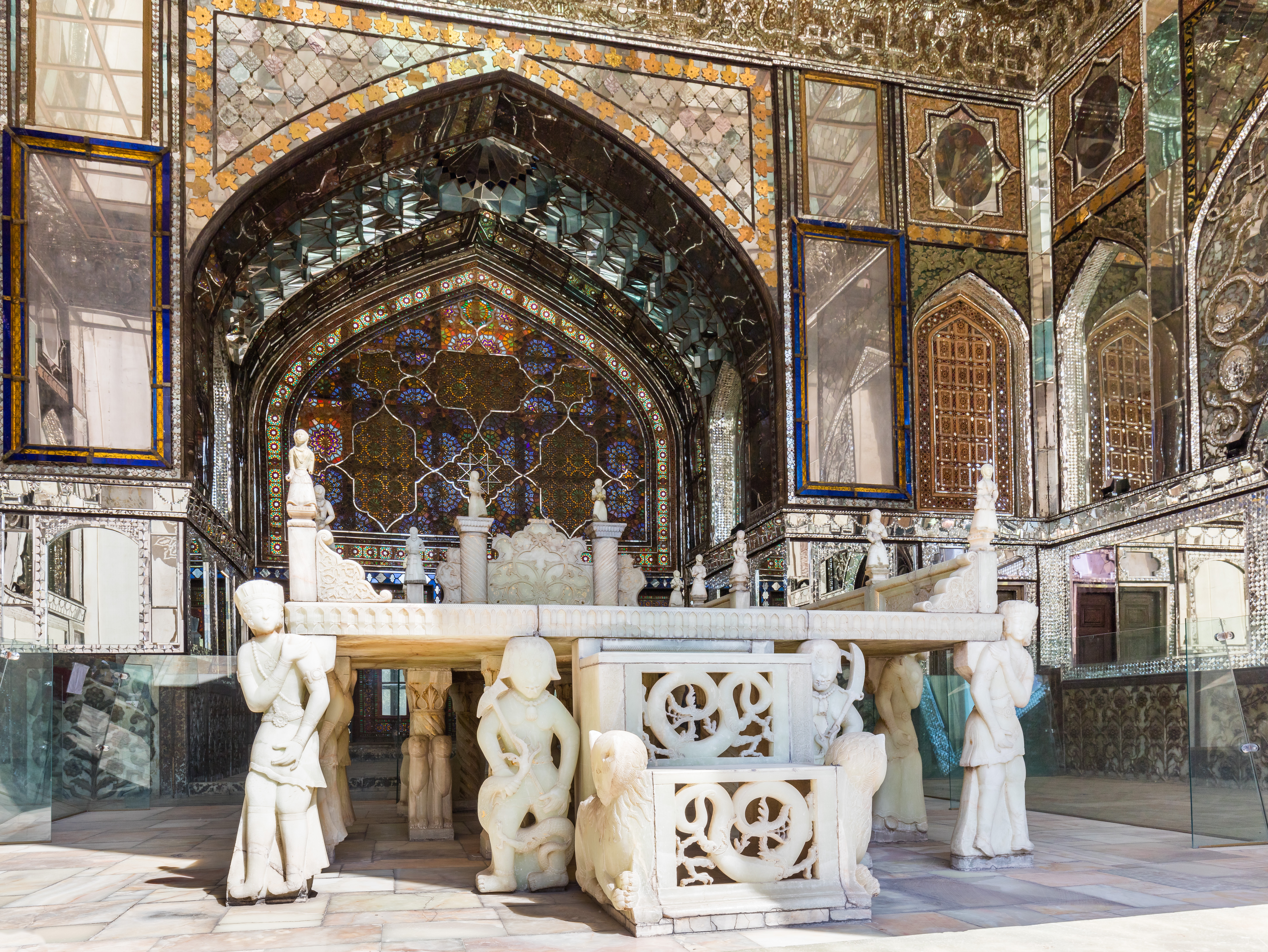
Takht-e Marmar, built from 1747 to 1751, housed in its eponymous iwan

This terrace, known as the Marble Throne, was built in 1747–1751.

=== Khalvat-e Karim Khani ===
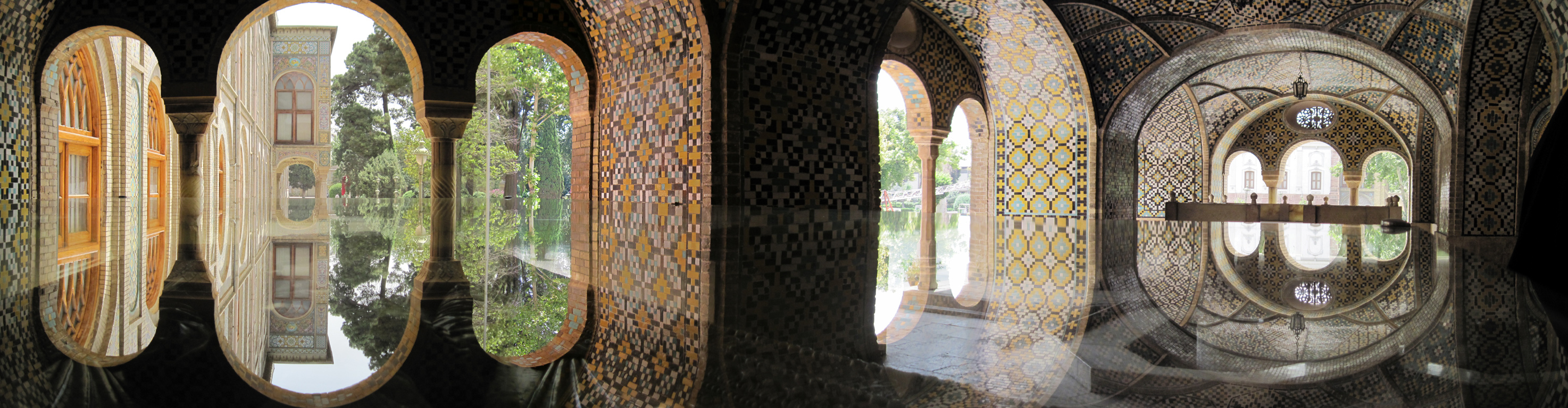
Panoramic view of the Khalvat-e Karim Khani

Dating back to 1759, this building was a part of the interior residence of Karim Khan of the Zand dynasty. The basic structure of the Karim Khani Nook is similar to the Marble Throne. Like the latter, it is a terrace. There is a small marble throne inside the terrace. The structure is much smaller than the Marble Throne and it has much less ornamentation. Water from a subterranean stream (the shah's qanat) flowed from the fountain into the pond and was later used to irrigate the palace grounds. Naser al-Din Shah Qajar (r. 1848–1896) was fond of this corner of the Golestan Palace.

=== Pond House (Howz Khaneh) ===
Works of European painters presented to the Qajar court are housed there.

=== Brilliant Hall (Talar-e Brelian) ===
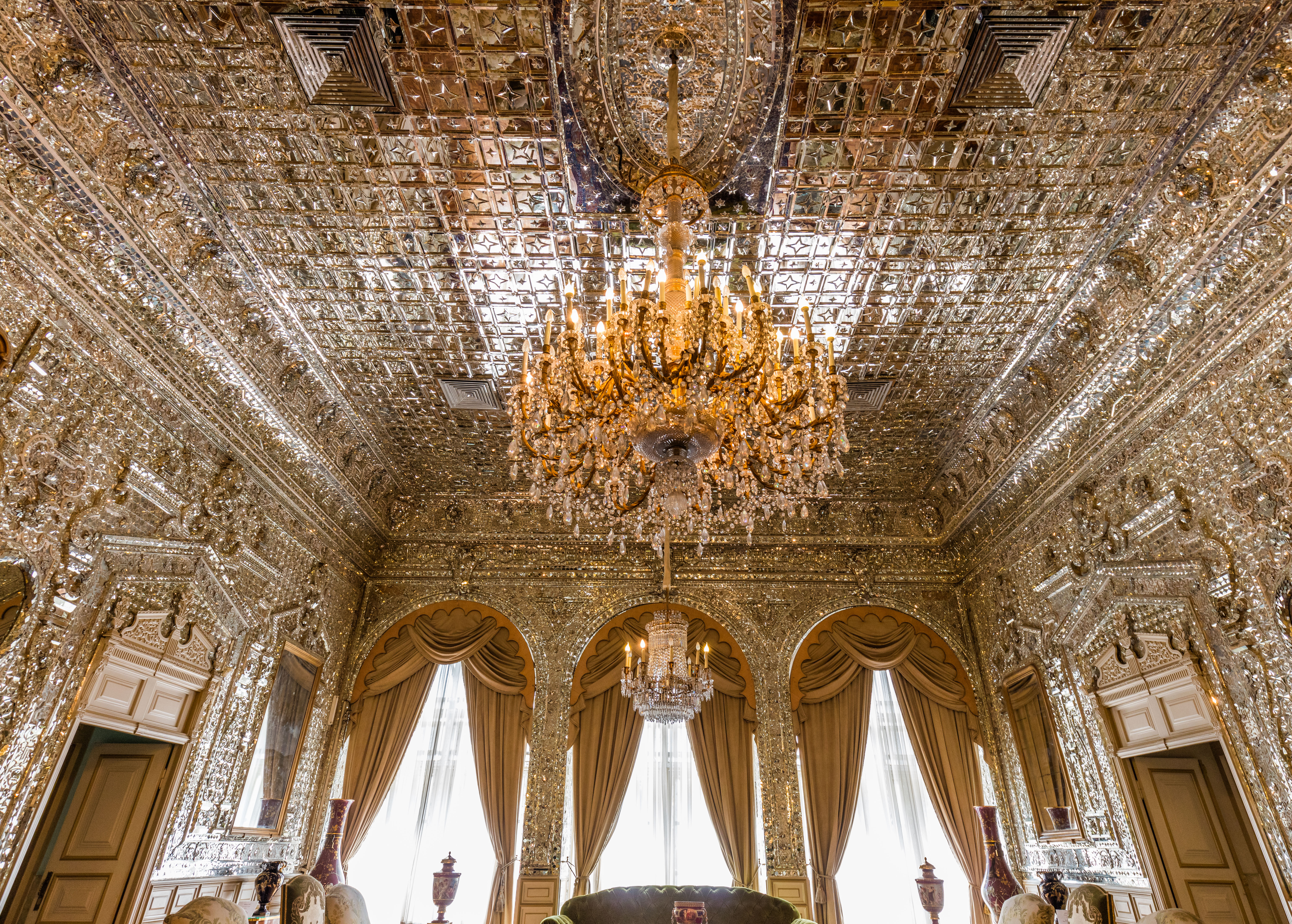
Talar-e Brelian (Brilliant Hall)

The Brilliant Hall was built by the order of Naser ed-Din Shah.

=== Containers' Hall (Talar-e Zoruf) ===
This building replaced the building of Narenjestan in the north of the Ivory Hall (Talar-e Adj).

=== Ivory Hall (Talar-e Adj) ===
Ivory Hall is a large hall used as a dining room. It was decorated with some gifts presented to Naser ed-Din Shah by European monarchs.

=== Mirror Hall (Talar-e Aineh) ===
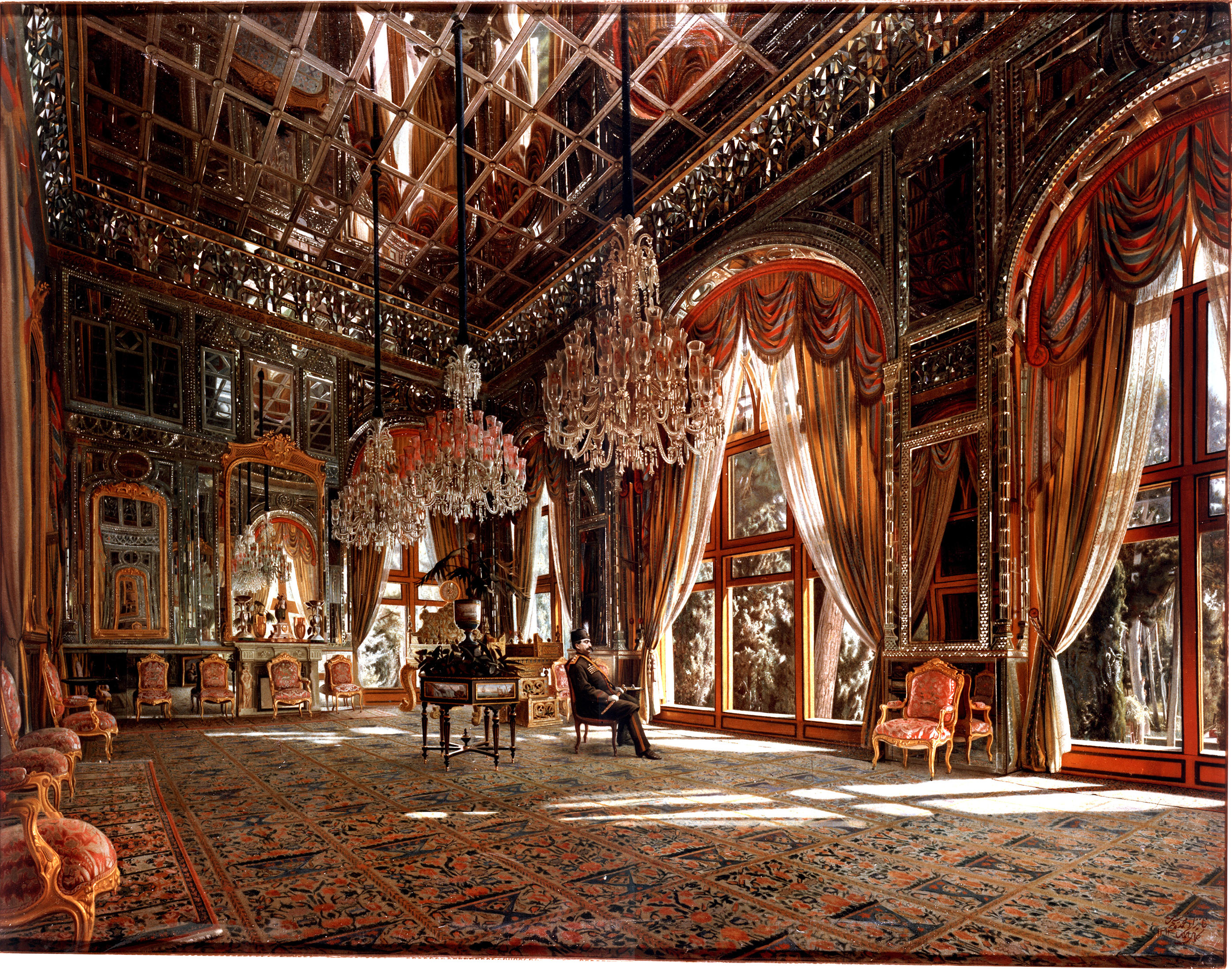
Mirror Hall, painted by Kamal-ol-molk

The Mirror Hall is a relatively small hall designed by Haj Abd ol Hossein Memar Bashi (Sanie ol Molk).

=== Salam Hall (Talar-e Salam) ===
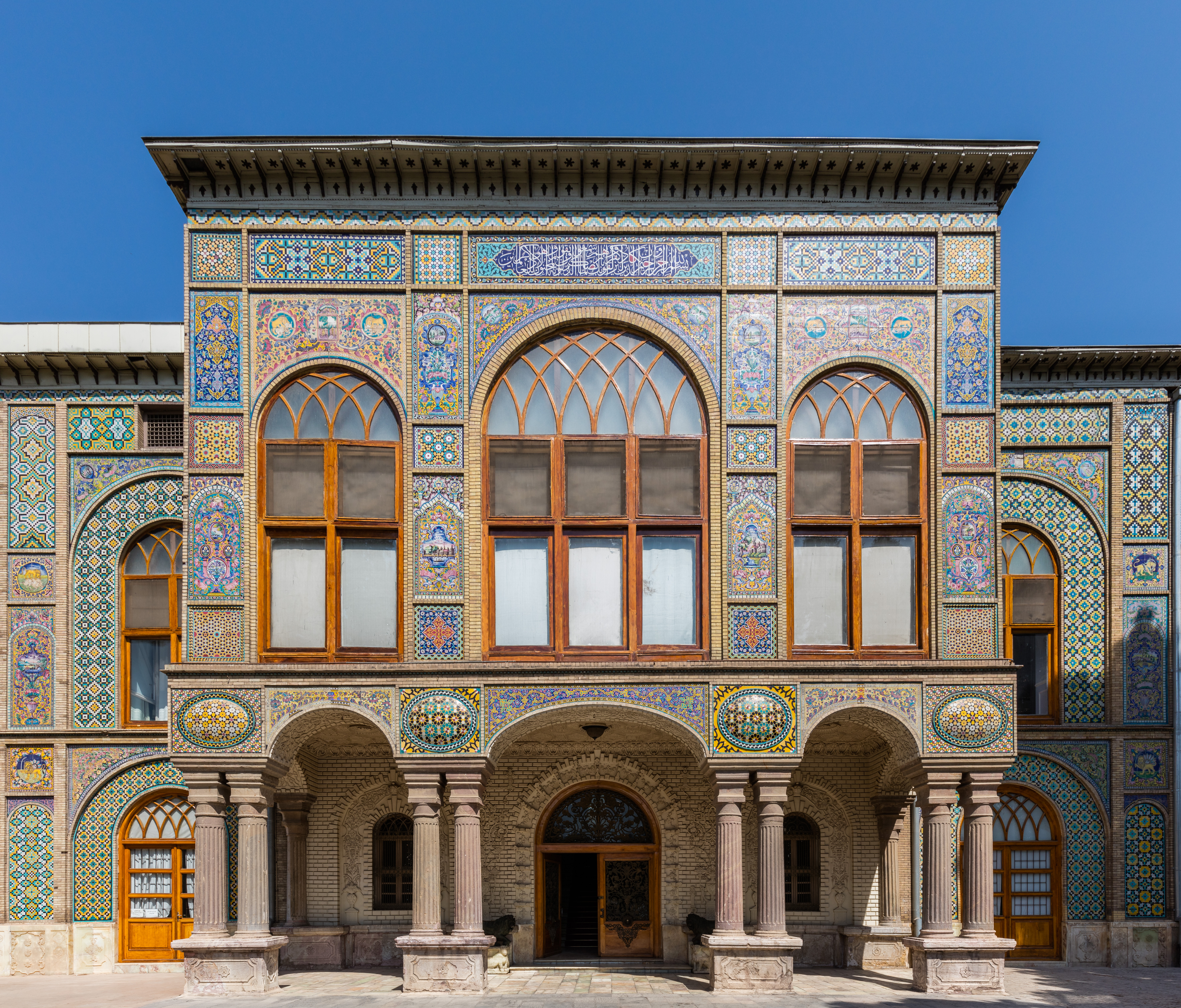
Entrance of Salam Hall

The Salam ("Reception") Hall was originally designed to be a museum. The coronation of Reza Shah in 1926 and the coronation of Mohammad Reza Pahlavi in 1967 were held in this hall.

=== Diamond Hall (Talar-e Almas) ===
The Diamond Hall is located in the southern wing of the Golestan Palace.

=== The Windcatcher Mansion (Emarat-e Badgir) ===
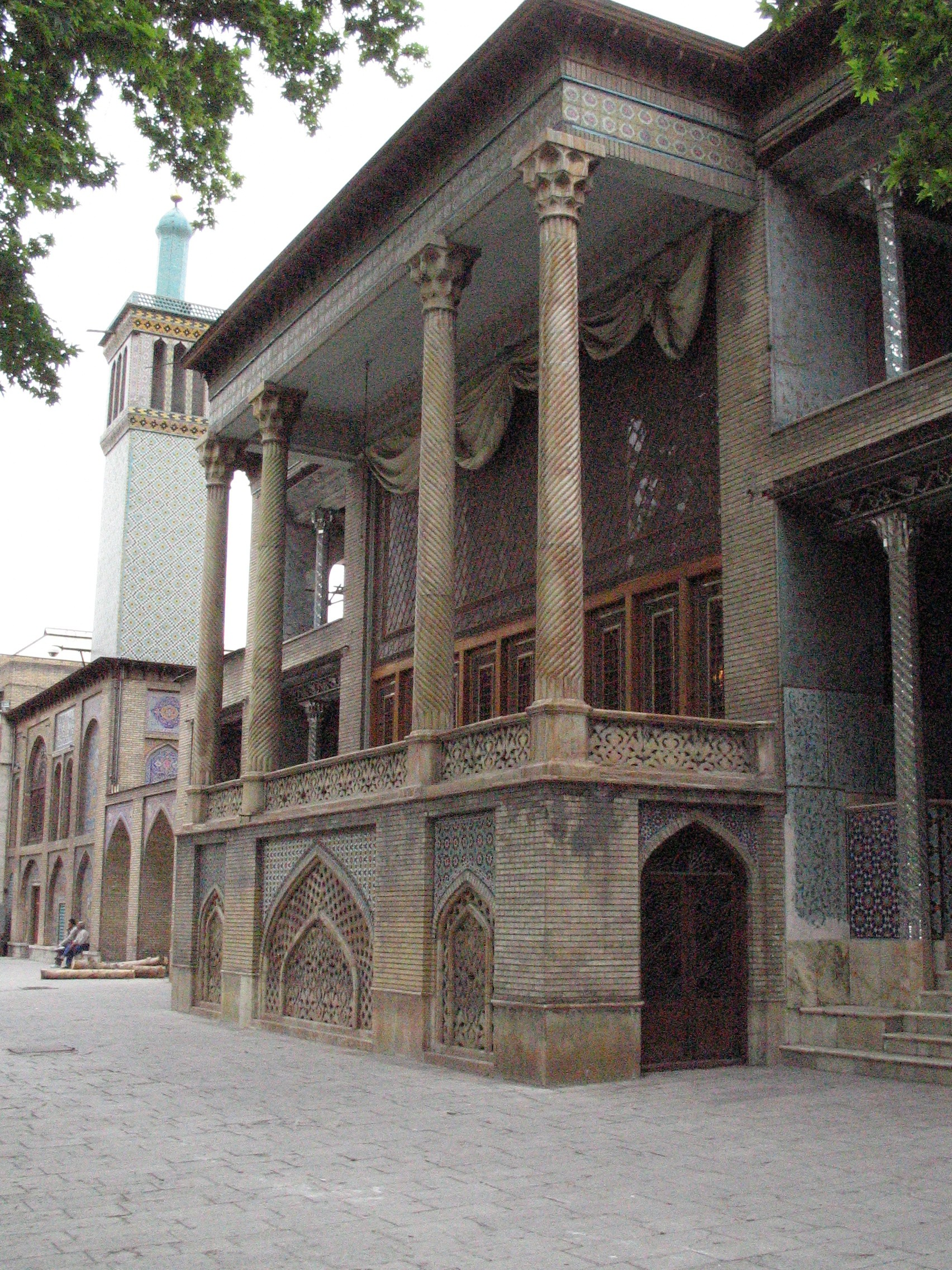
The Windcatcher Mansion

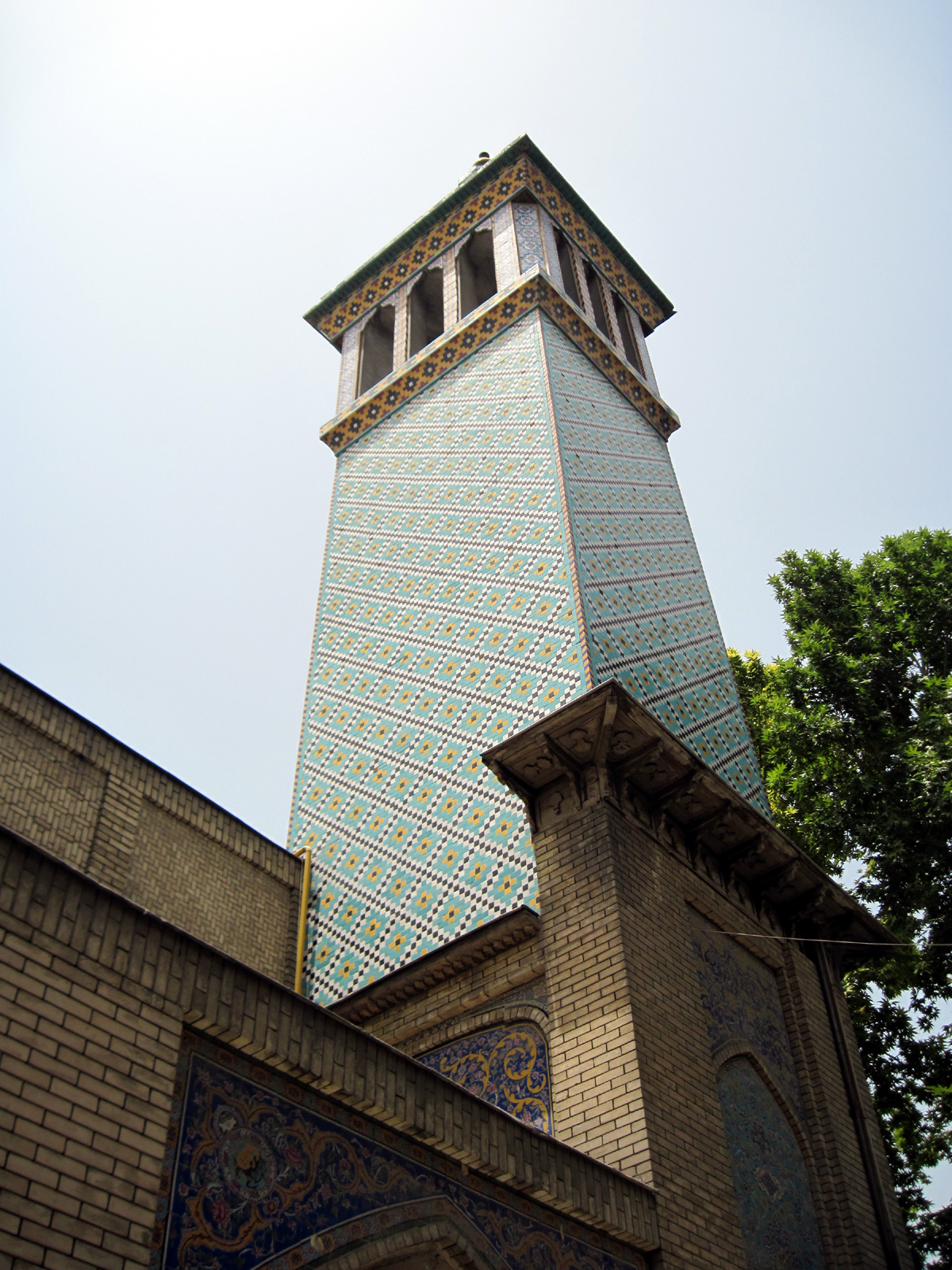
One of the Windcatchers

The Windcatcher Mansion was constructed during the reign of Fath-Ali Shah Qajar. The building underwent major renovations, including structural changes, during the reign of Naser ed-Din Shah.

=== Edifice of the Sun (Shams-ol-Emareh) ===
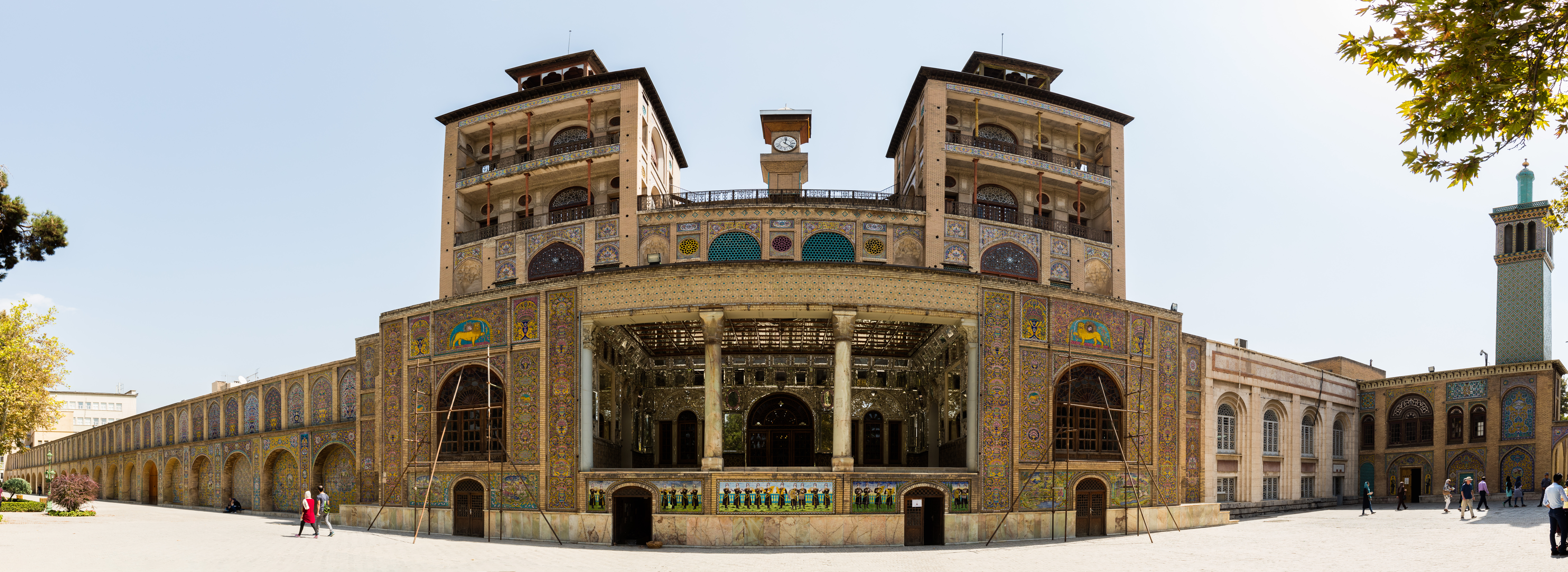
The Edifice of the Sun

The Edifice of the Sun was designed by Moayer ol Mamalek. Construction on this building began in 1865 and was completed in two years. A clock presented by Queen Victoria to Naser al-Din Shah and mounted atop the building was repaired in 2012.

=== Museum of Gifts ===
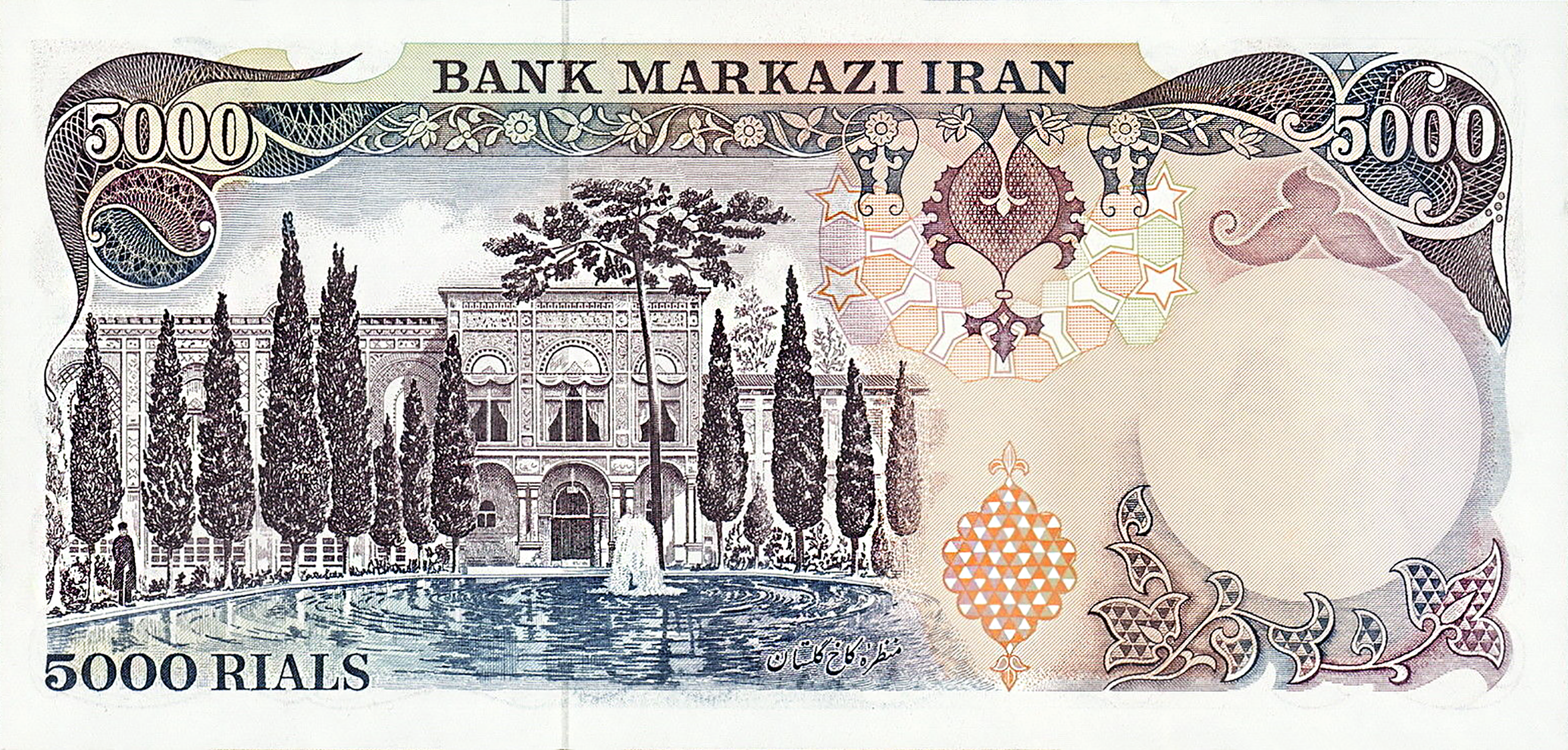
Golestan Palace on the reverse of a 1974 5000 Iranian rial banknote

This building is located under the Salam Hall.

=== Abyaz Palace ===
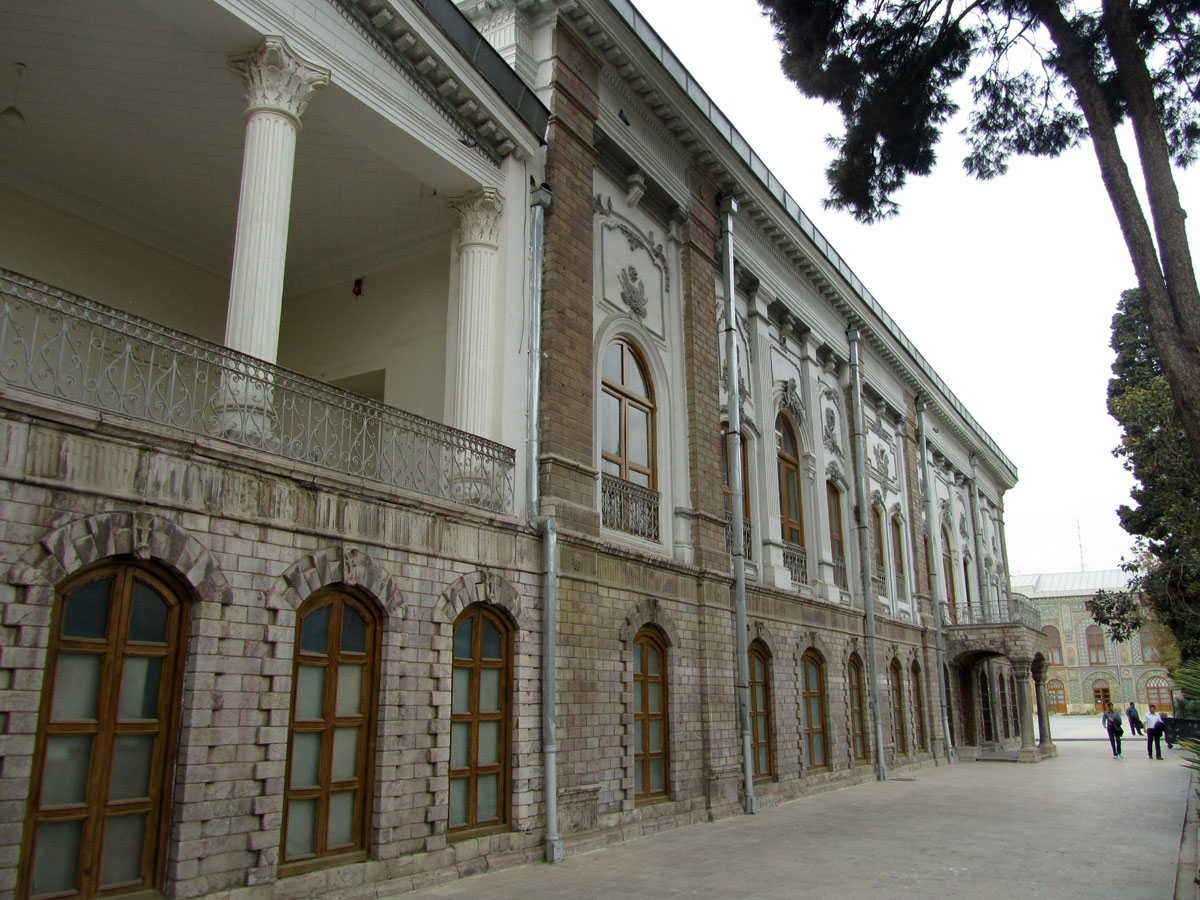
The Abyaz Palace

The Abyaz Palace was completed in 1883 to exhibit Ottoman gifts. Its construction was under the direct supervision of Naser al-Din Shah Qajar and the structure was designed by the shah himself. The building is an example of neo-baroque architecture and used to feature impressive displays such as Louis XVI living room decors, velvet curtains, gold and bronze statues and Turkish rugs. The external white façade of the building led to it gradually being called “Abyaz” (White).

=== Museum Hall ===
The original collection of the Museum Hall is now scattered among Tehran's many museums.

=== Photographic archive ===
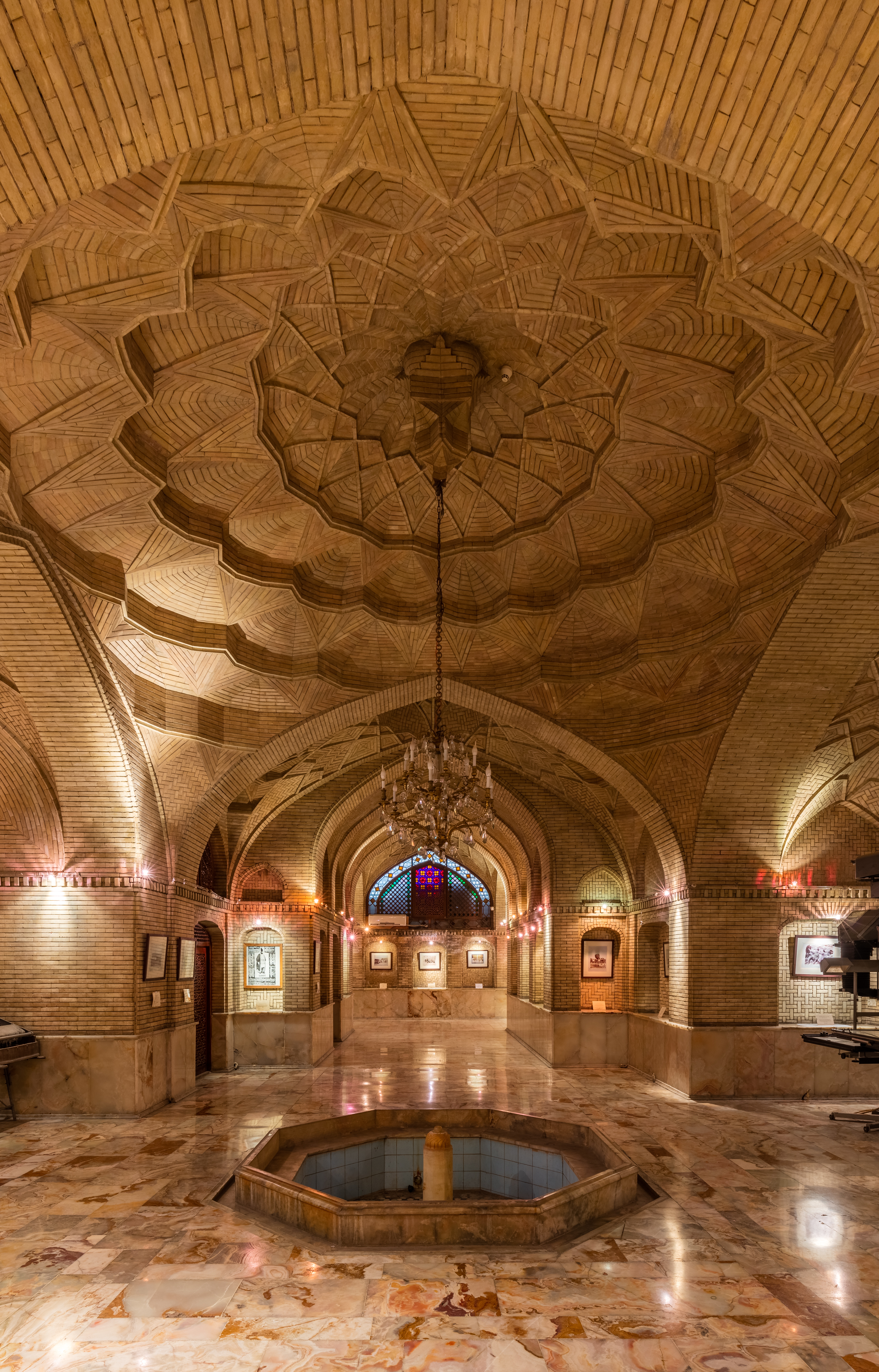
Photographic archive

There is an early photographic collection at the Golestan complex which includes photos which are mainly related to the time of the 19th-century progress of photography in Europe. It was created by the order of Naser ed-Din Shah. It is mentioned that "photography was so common at the royal palace that the king's wives and his servants also took pictures and posed playfully in front of the camera." There is a picture of one servant with flowers decorating his head and shoulders.

== Restoration ==
Between 2007 and 2021, a series of restoration projects were undertaken.

- Marble Throne Veranda (Takht-e Marmar): Conservation efforts included cleaning and consolidation of stone elements.
- Shams-ol-Emareh: Structural cracks were repaired.
- Tile Restoration: Original Qajar tiles underwent cleaning.
- Hall of Mirrors (Talar-e Ayeneh): Restoration focused on stabilizing mirror work.
- HVAC and Drainage Systems: Climate control and drainage systems were installed.

=== Considerations ===
The restoration projects were guided by internationally recognized conservation principles:

- Minimal Intervention: Interventions were limited to what was necessary.
- Reversibility: Materials and methods used were chosen to allow future removal.
- Material Compatibility: Traditional materials were utilized.
- Distinguishability: Modern additions were designed to be visually distinguishable from original elements.

=== Ongoing challenges ===
Despite significant progress, several challenges persist:

- Urban pollution: The palace's location exposes it to high levels of pollution, contributing to material degradation.
- Climate factors: Seasonal humidity and temperature fluctuations exacerbate issues like salt efflorescence and biological colonization.
- Public engagement: There is a need for enhanced public engagement and education to foster appreciation and support for ongoing conservation efforts.
- 2026 Iran war: An attack carried out jointly by Israel and the United States on 2 March 2026 caused heavy damage due to a shockwave from a nearby air strike. Masonry fell and caused damage, and some mirrors in the Hall of Mirrors were shattered.

== Heritage status ==
On 11 October 2005, the Cultural Heritage Organization of Iran submitted the palace to the UNESCO for inclusion into the World Heritage List in 2007. On 23 June 2013, it was proclaimed a World Heritage Site during the UNESCO meeting at Phnom Penh.

The Golestan Palace is currently operated by the Cultural Heritage Organization of Iran.

== Gallery ==
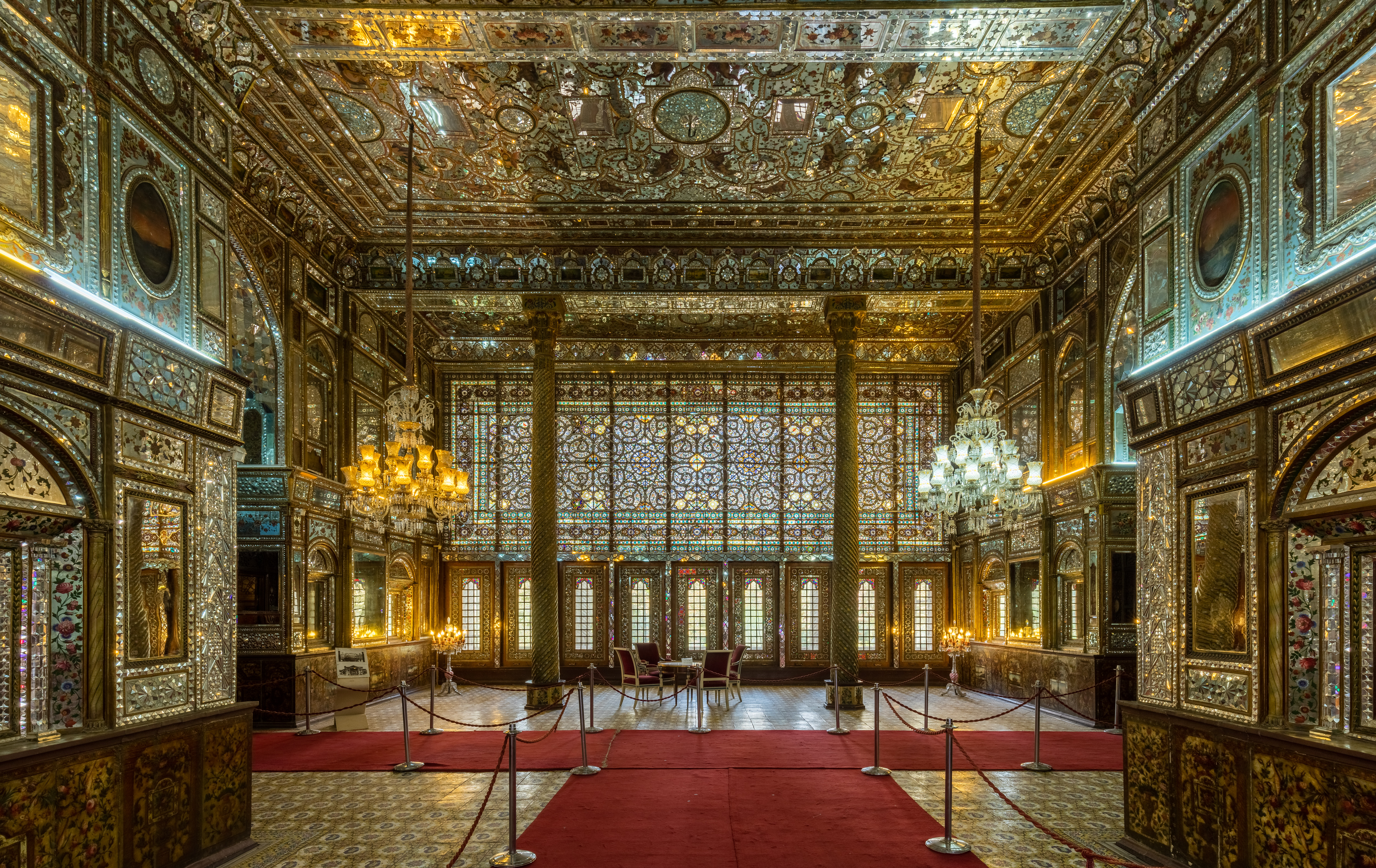
The Windcatcher Mansion

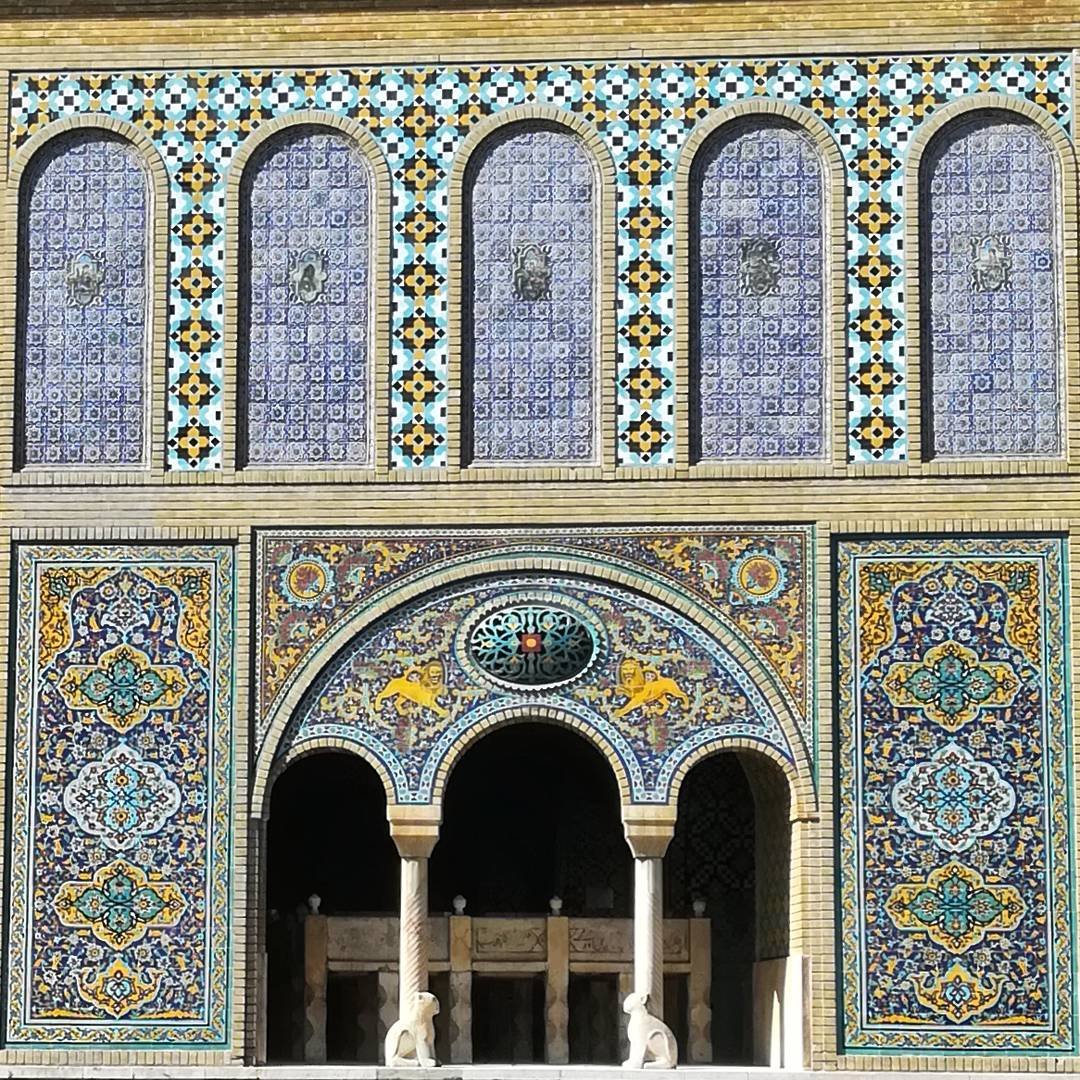
Karim Khani Nook

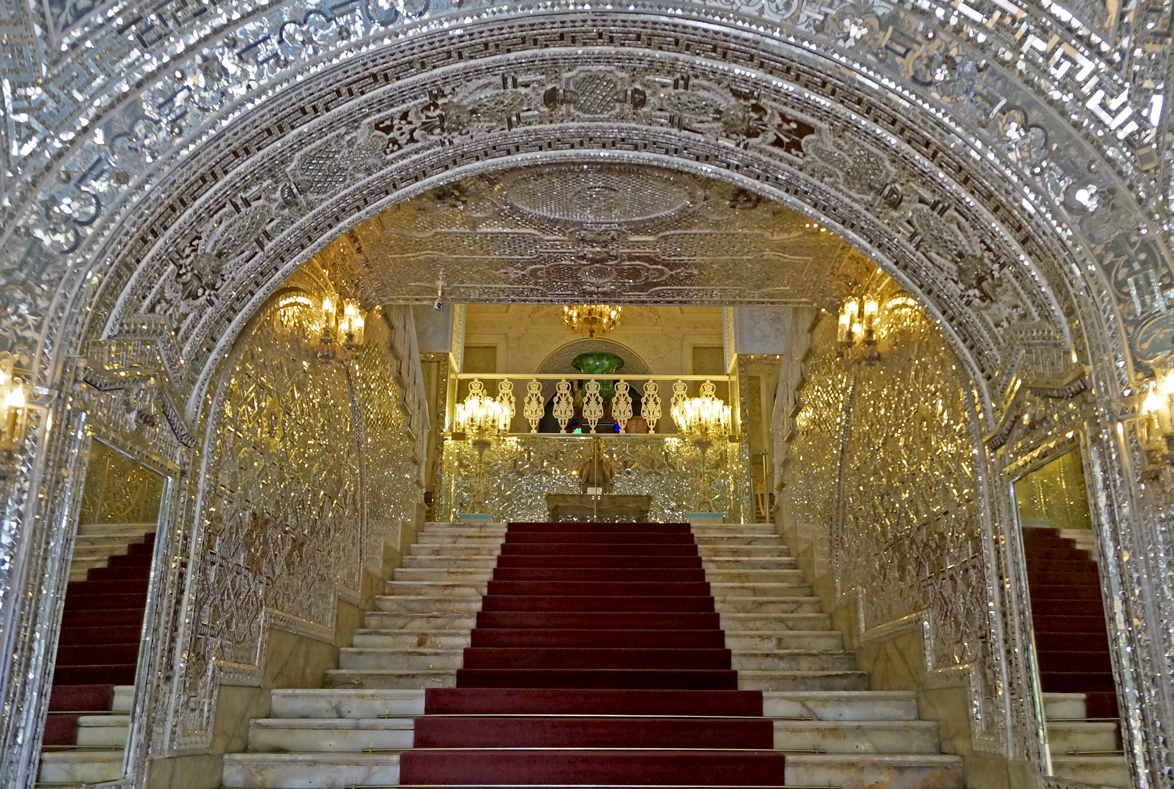
Stairs leading up to the Salam Hall

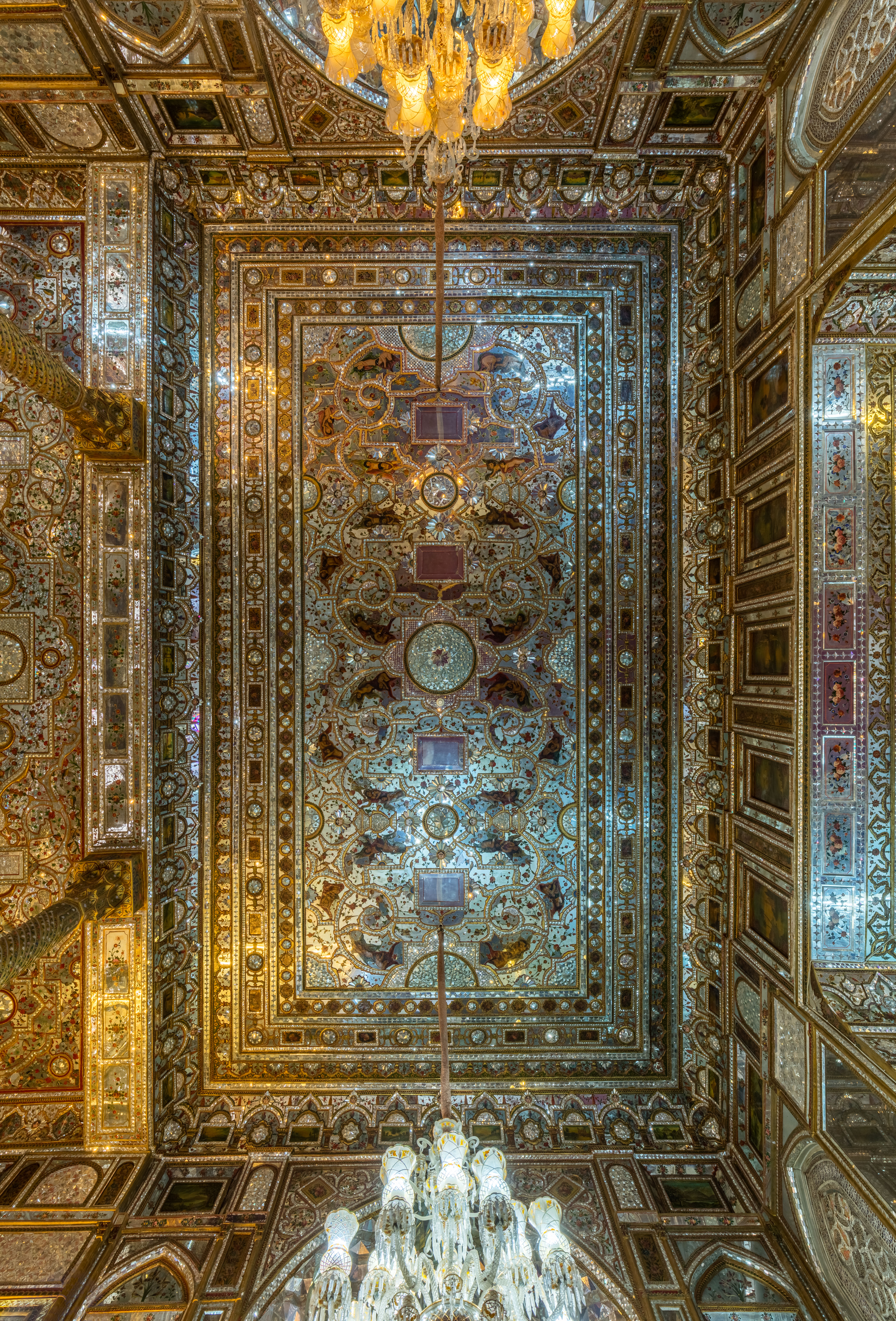
The ceiling of the Windcatcher Mansion

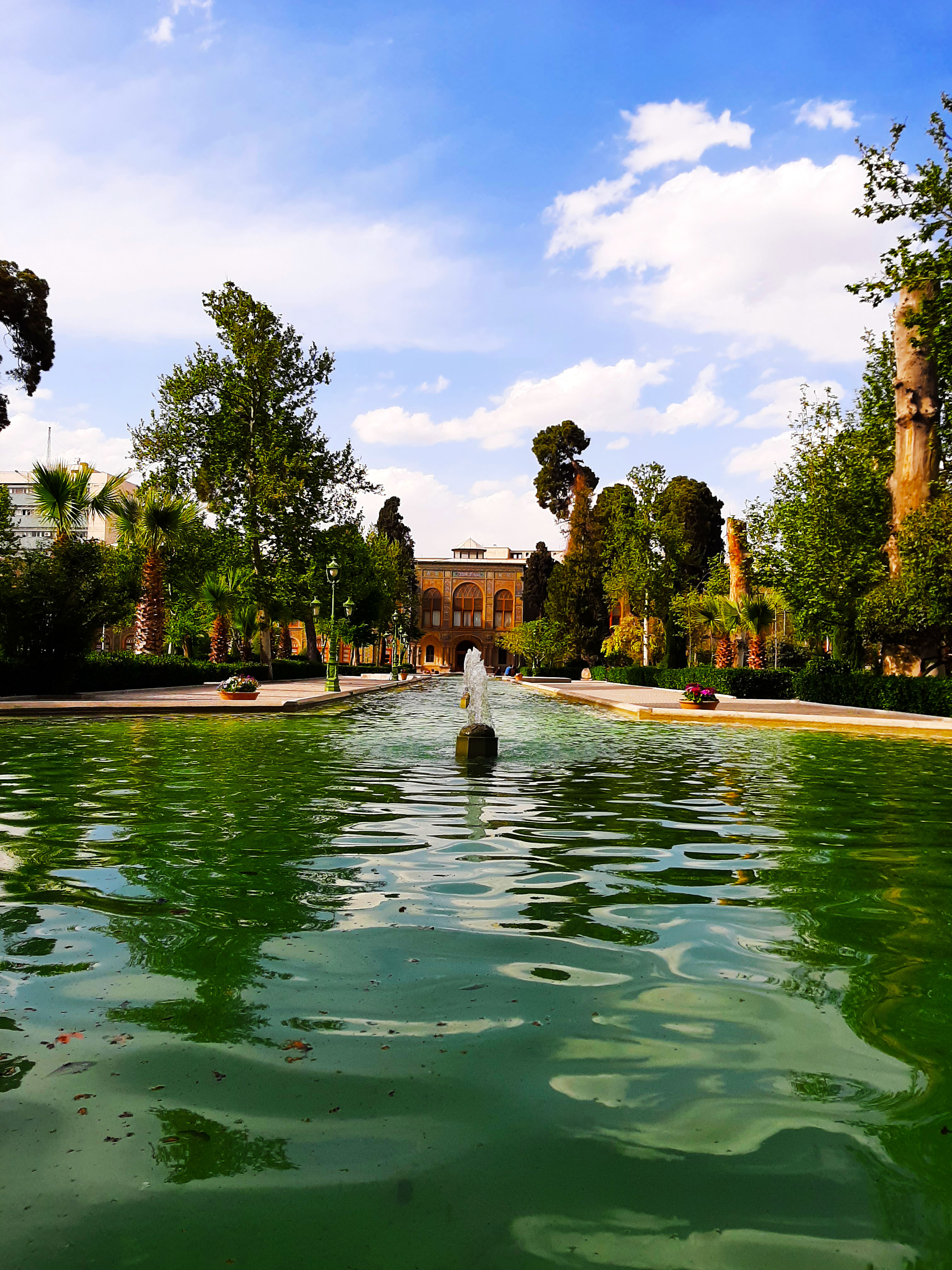
A pool

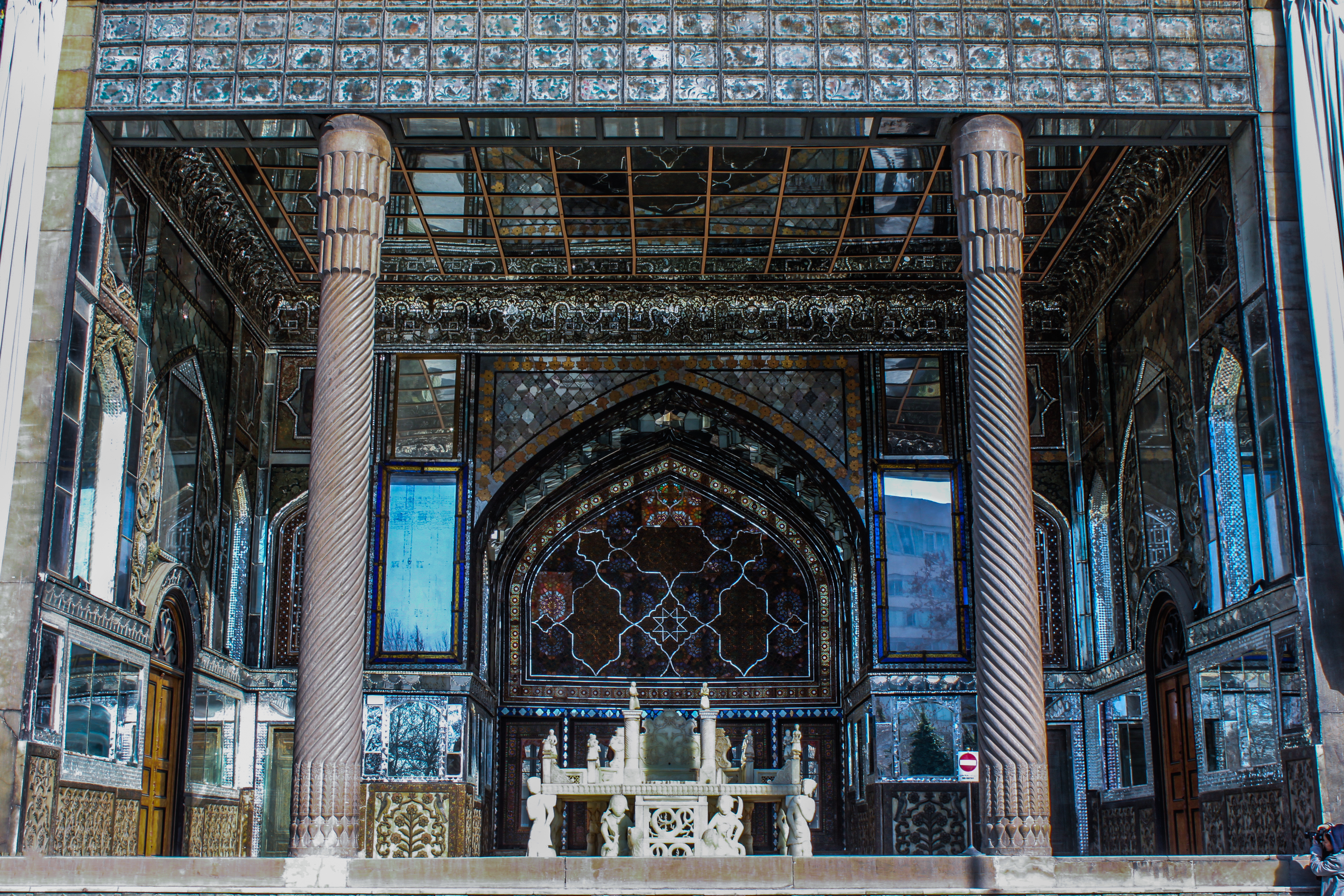
The Marble Throne

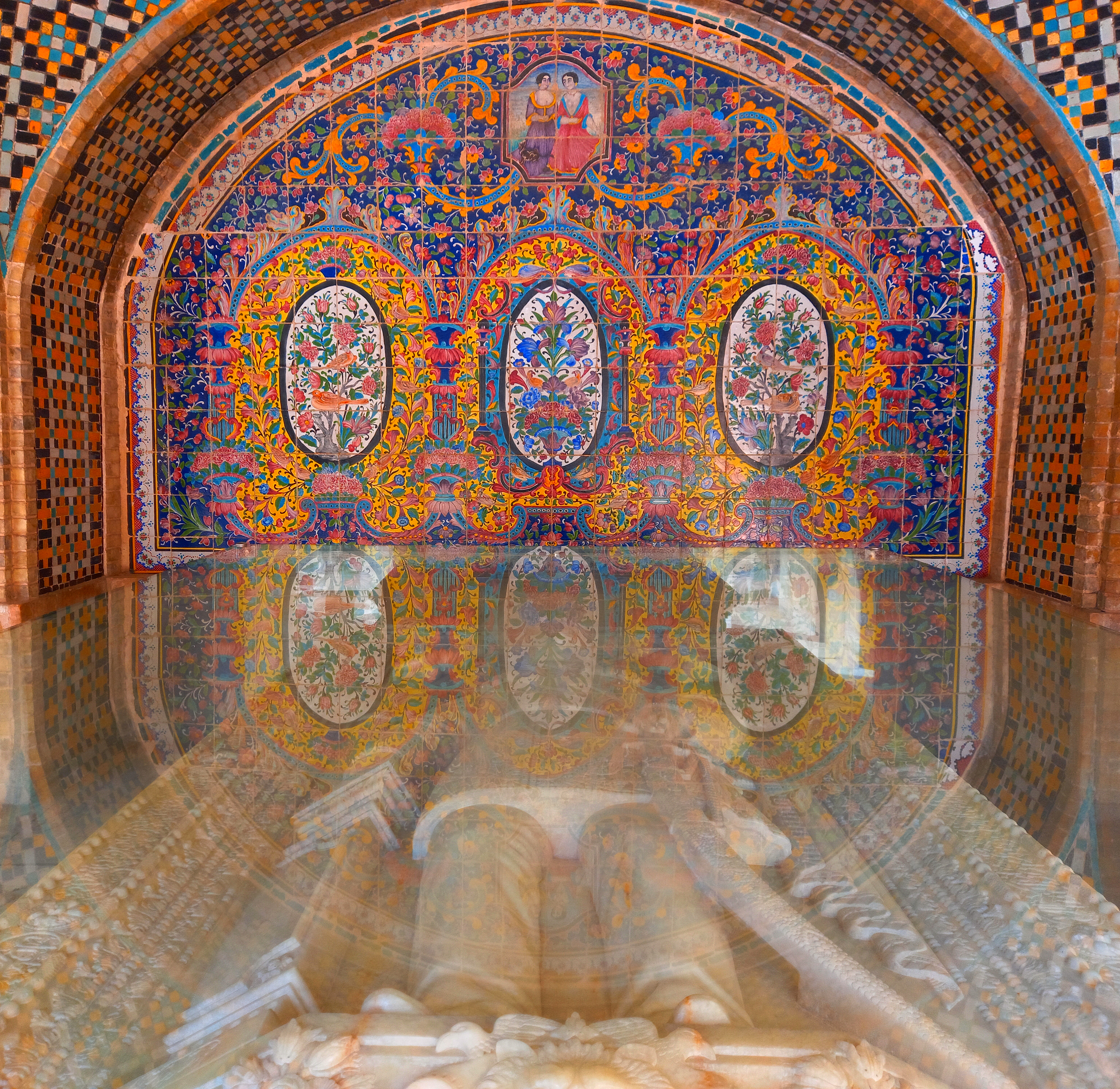
Tombstone of Naser al-Din Shah Qajar

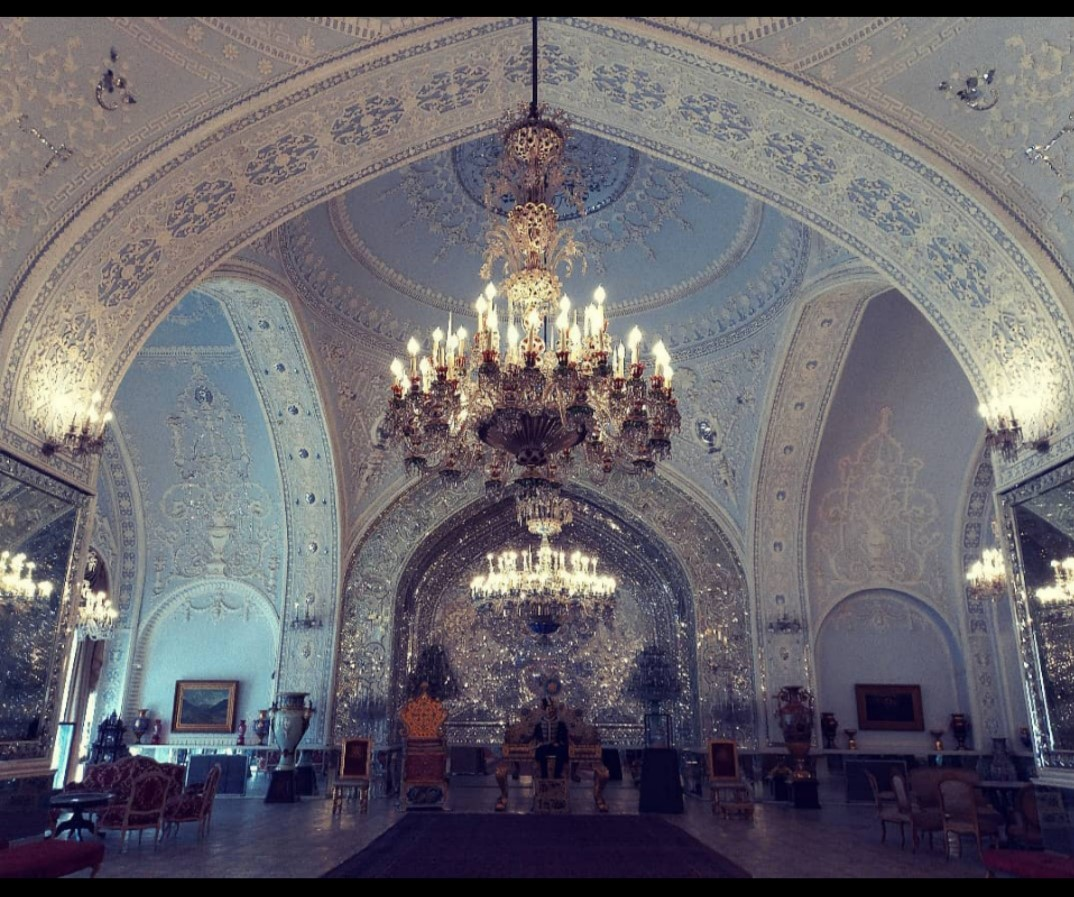
The ceiling of Salam Hall

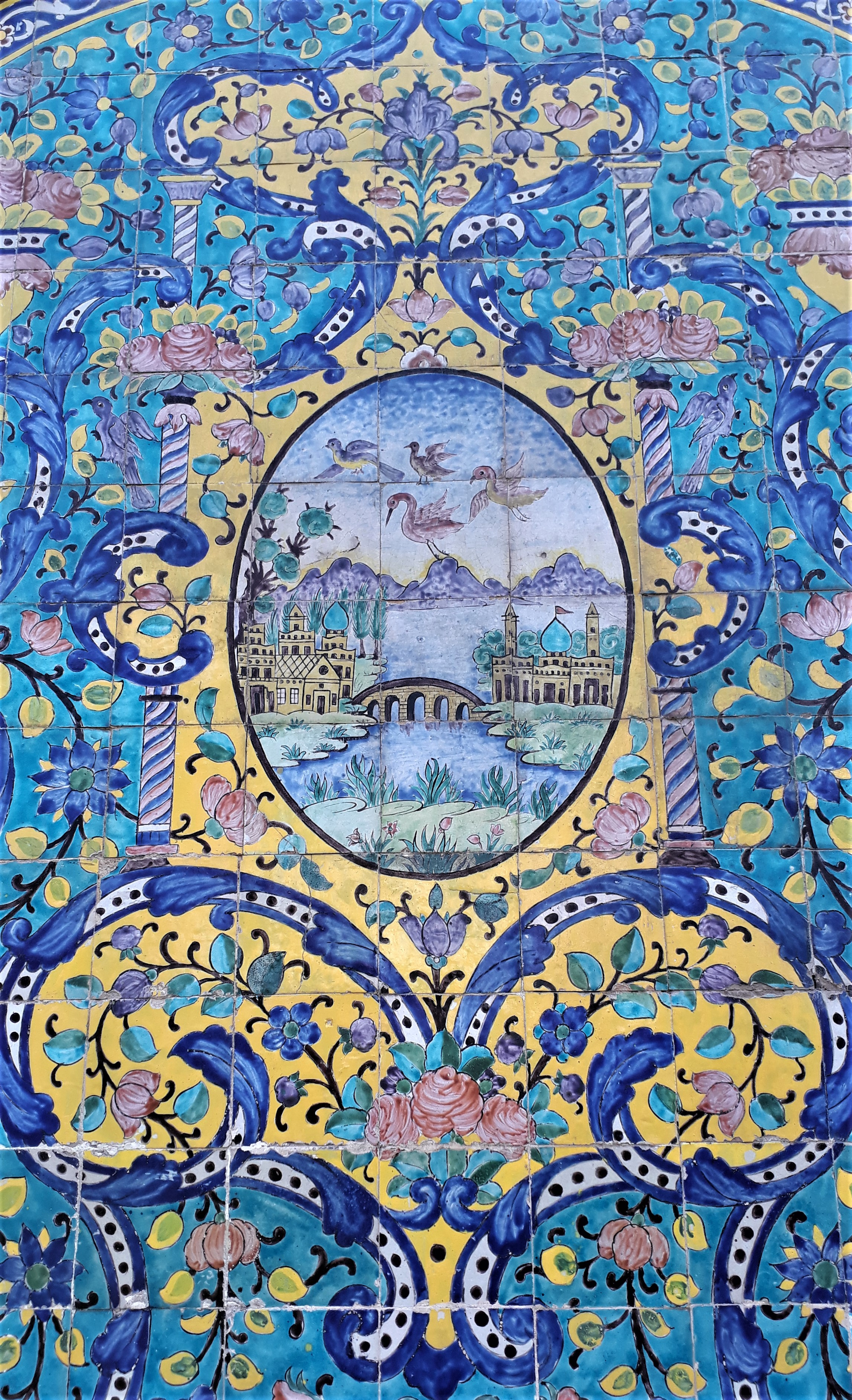
Tilings 1

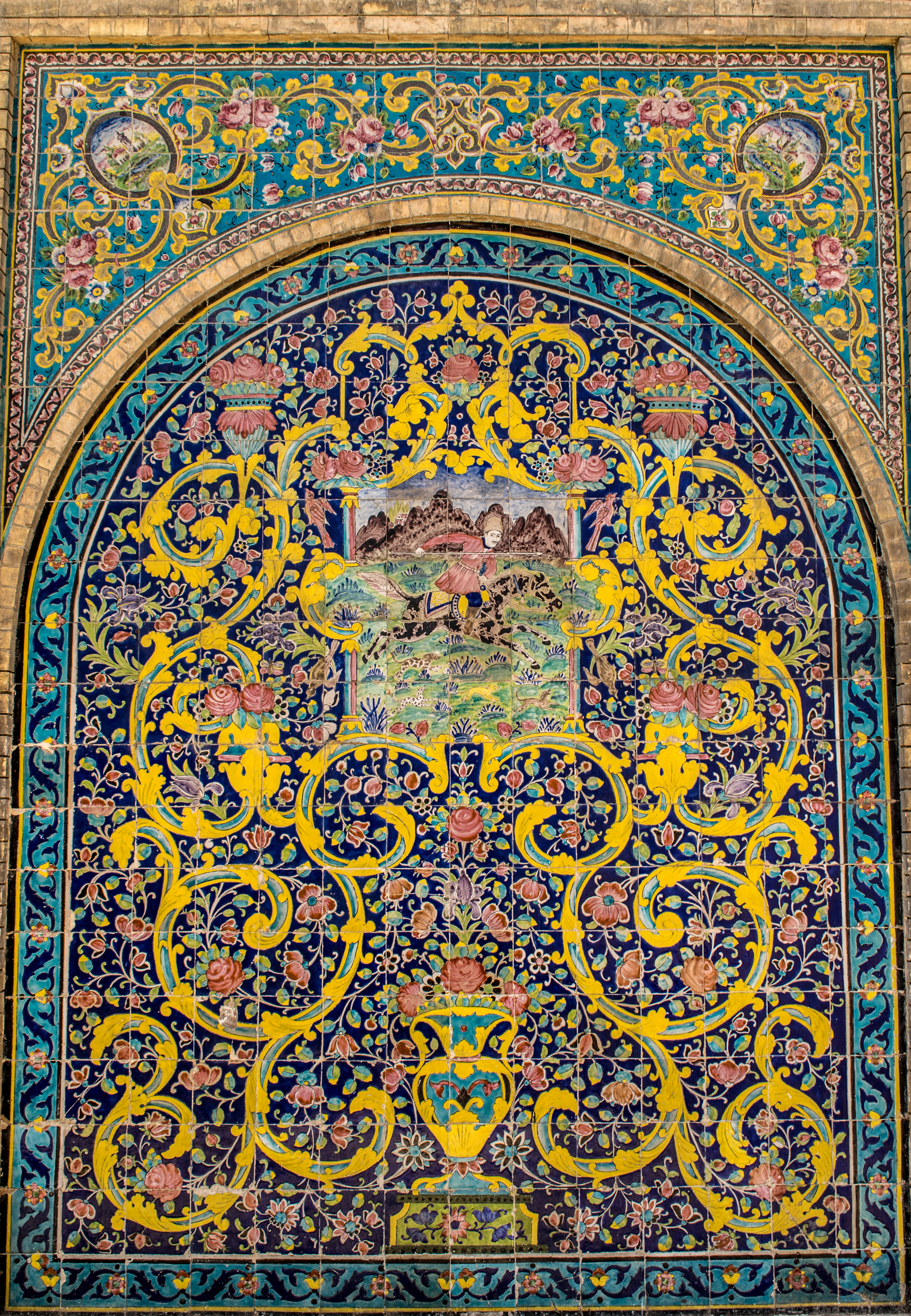
Tilings 2

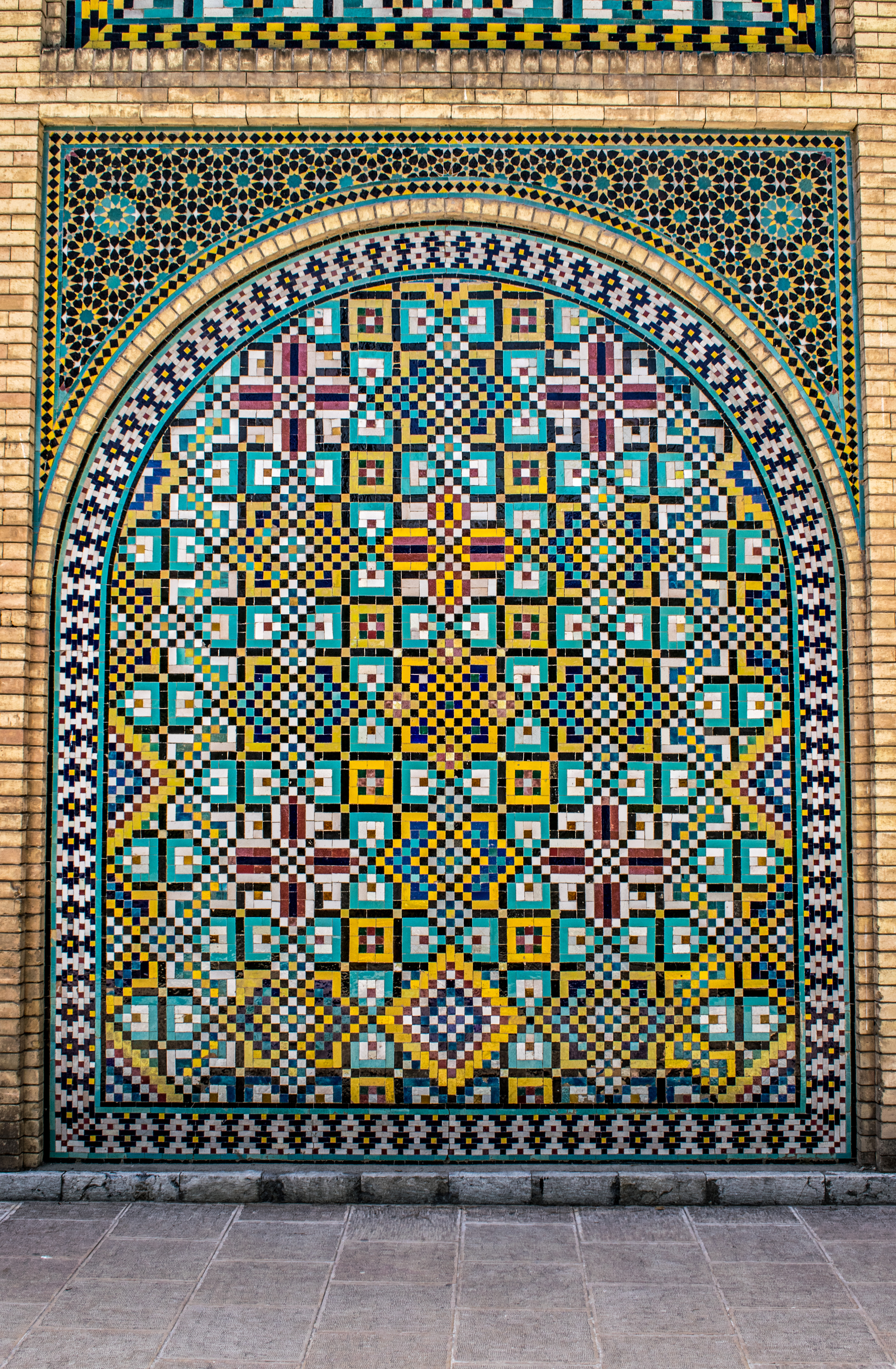
Tilings 3

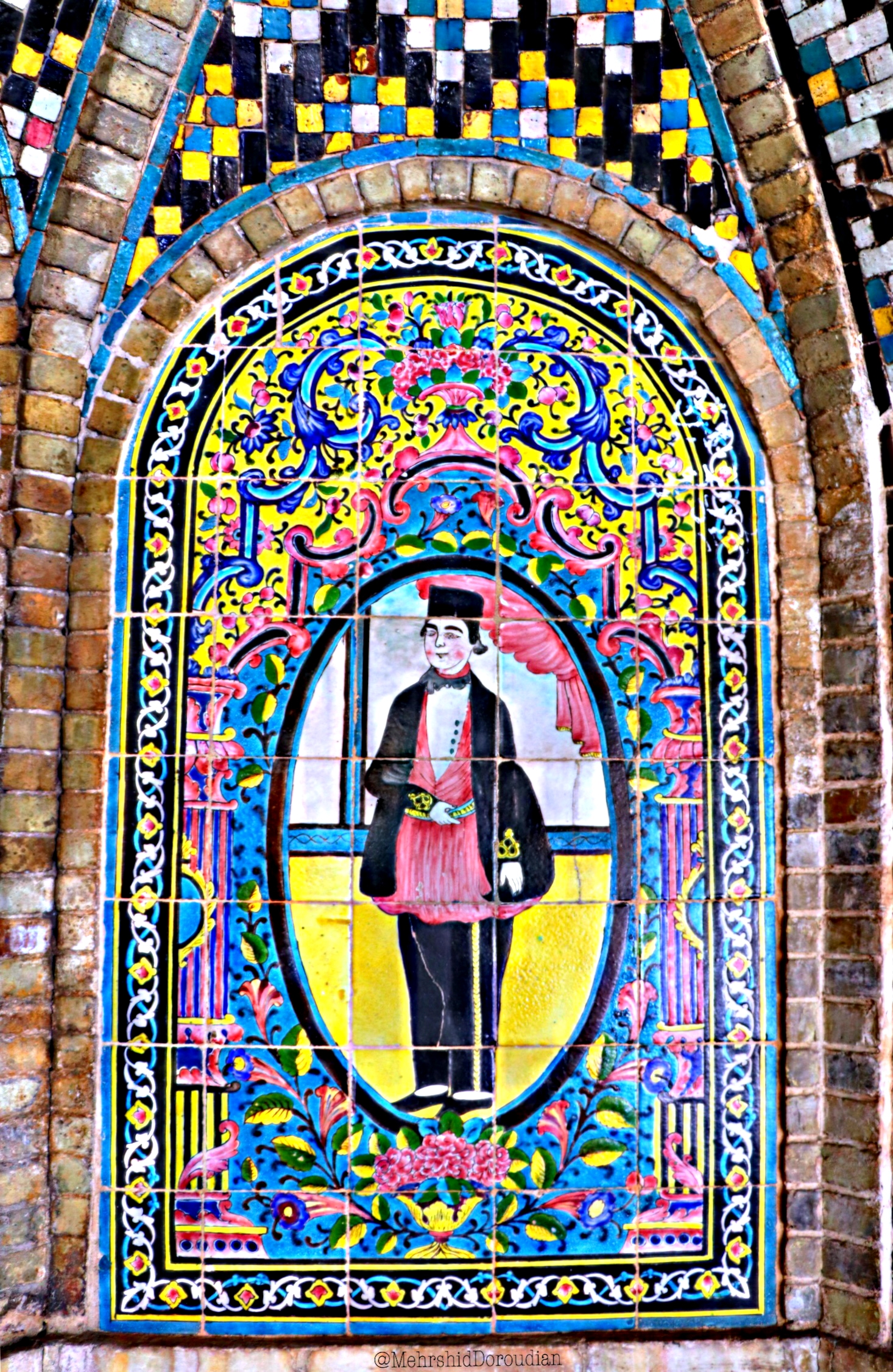
Tilings 4

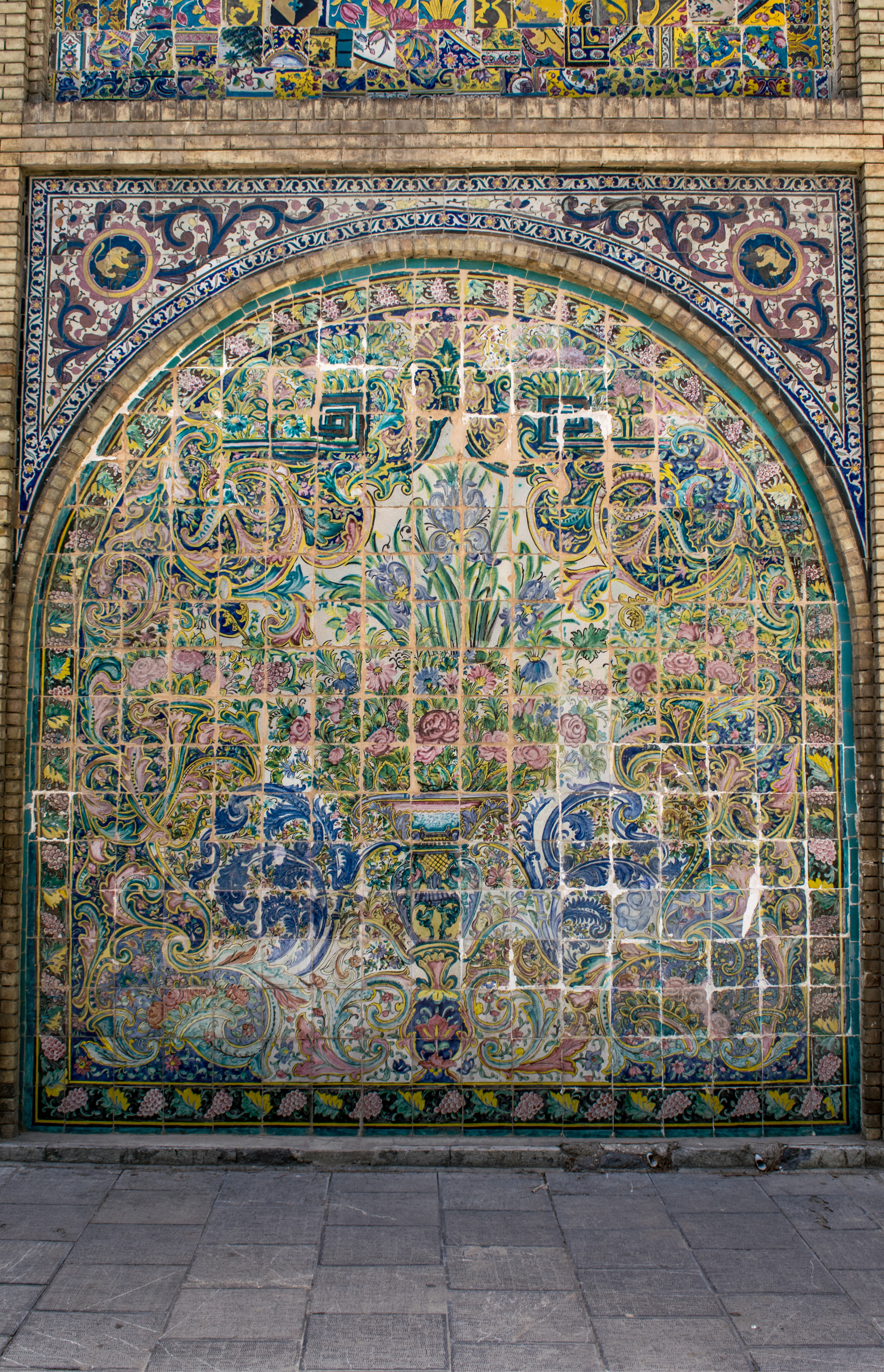
Tilings 5

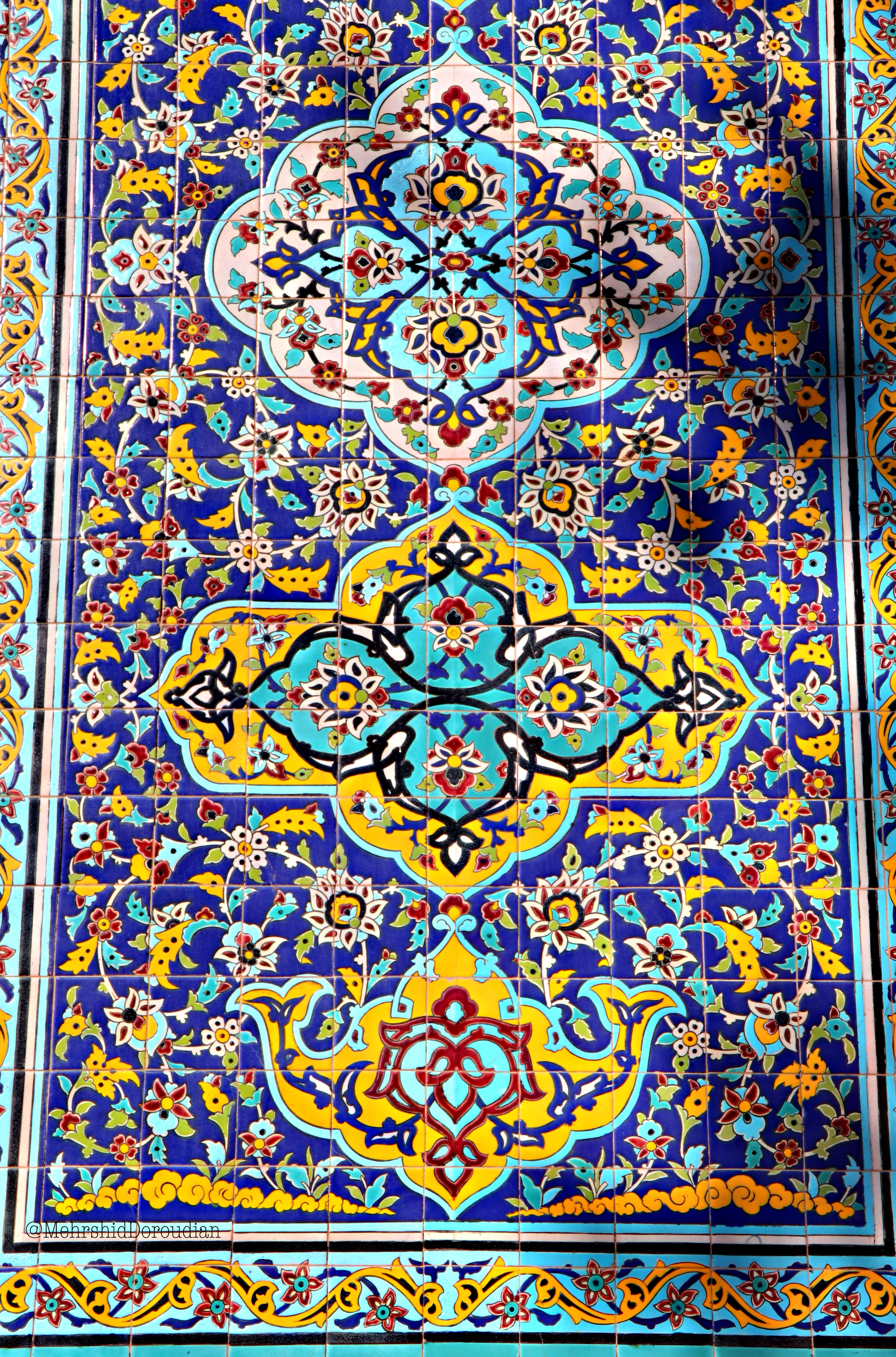
Tilings 6

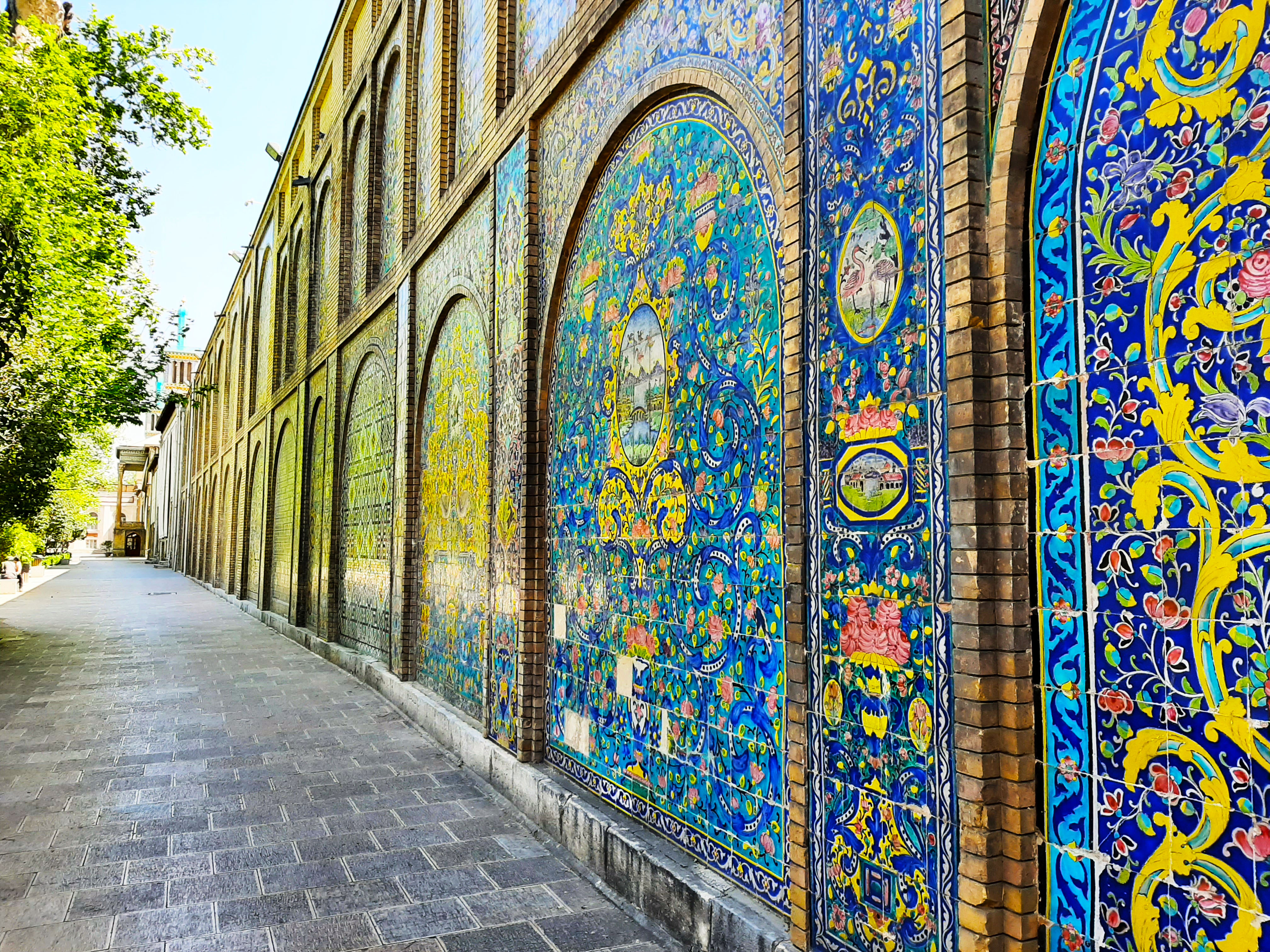
Tilings on the walls

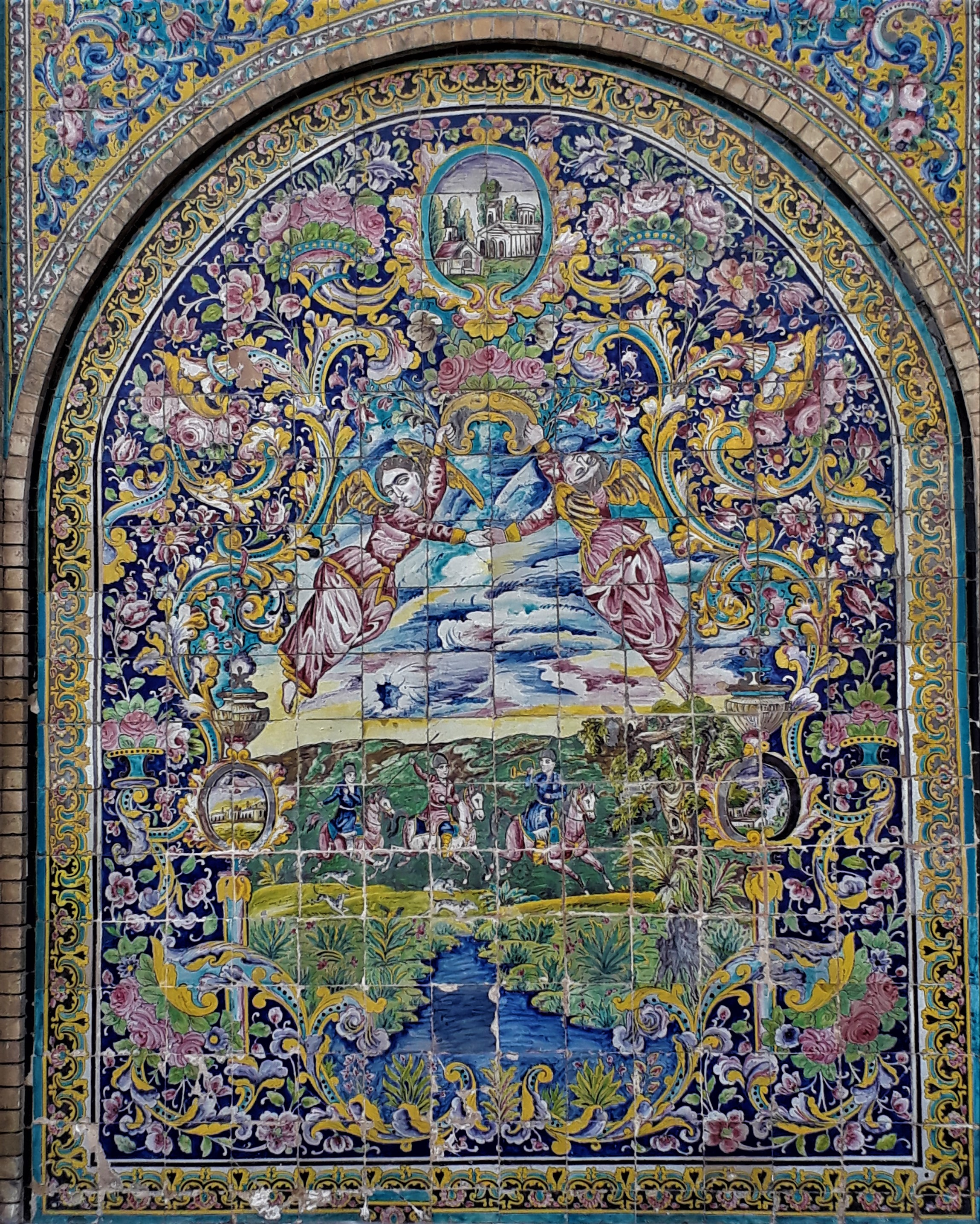
Tilings 7

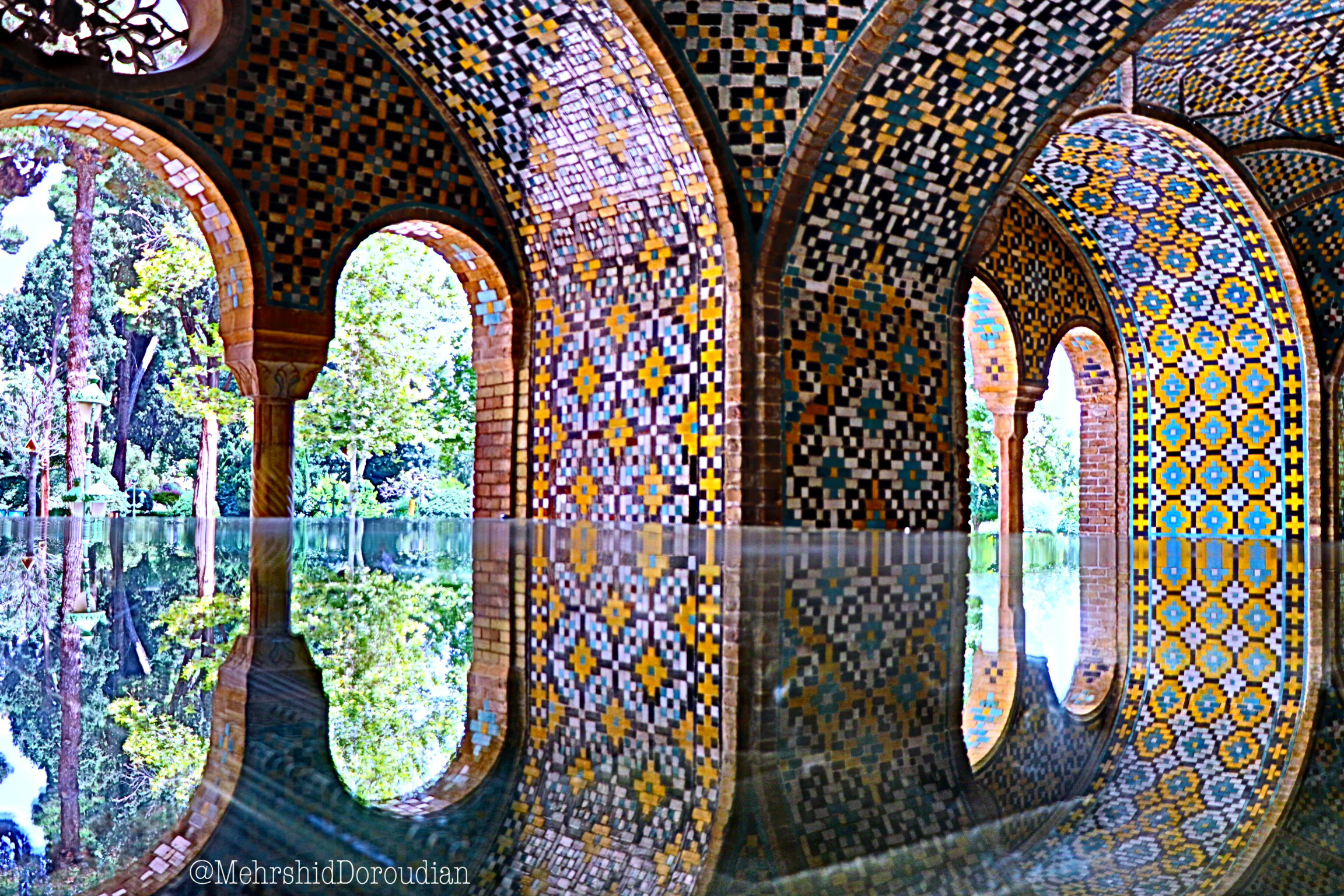
Tilings on the Karim Khani Nook

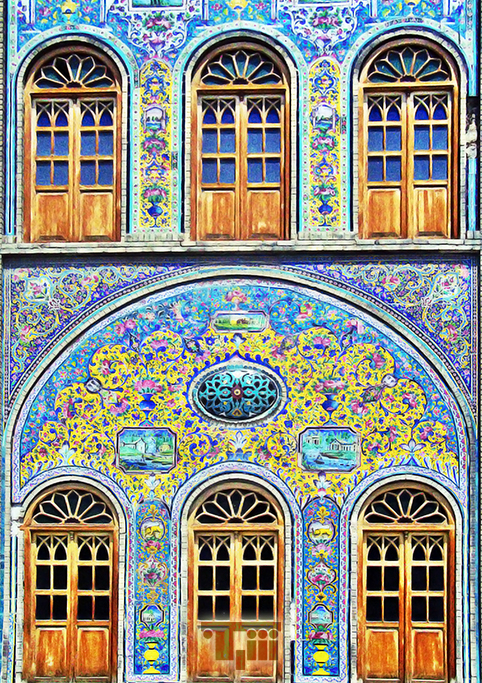
Tilings on the palace

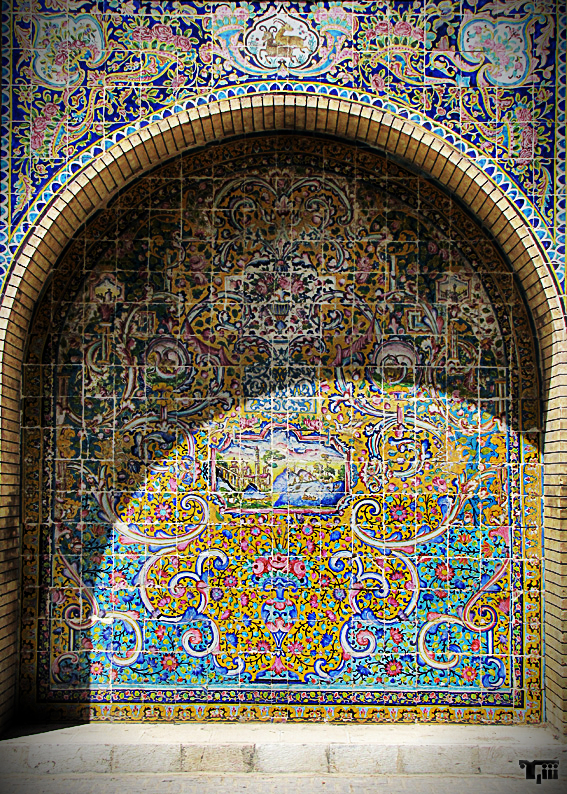
Tilings 8

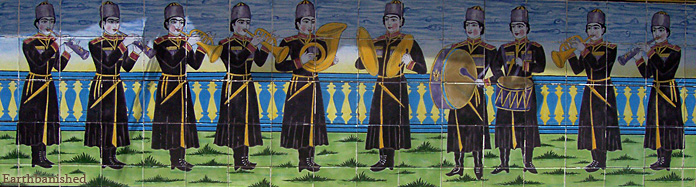
Tilings on the Shams-ol-Emareh palace

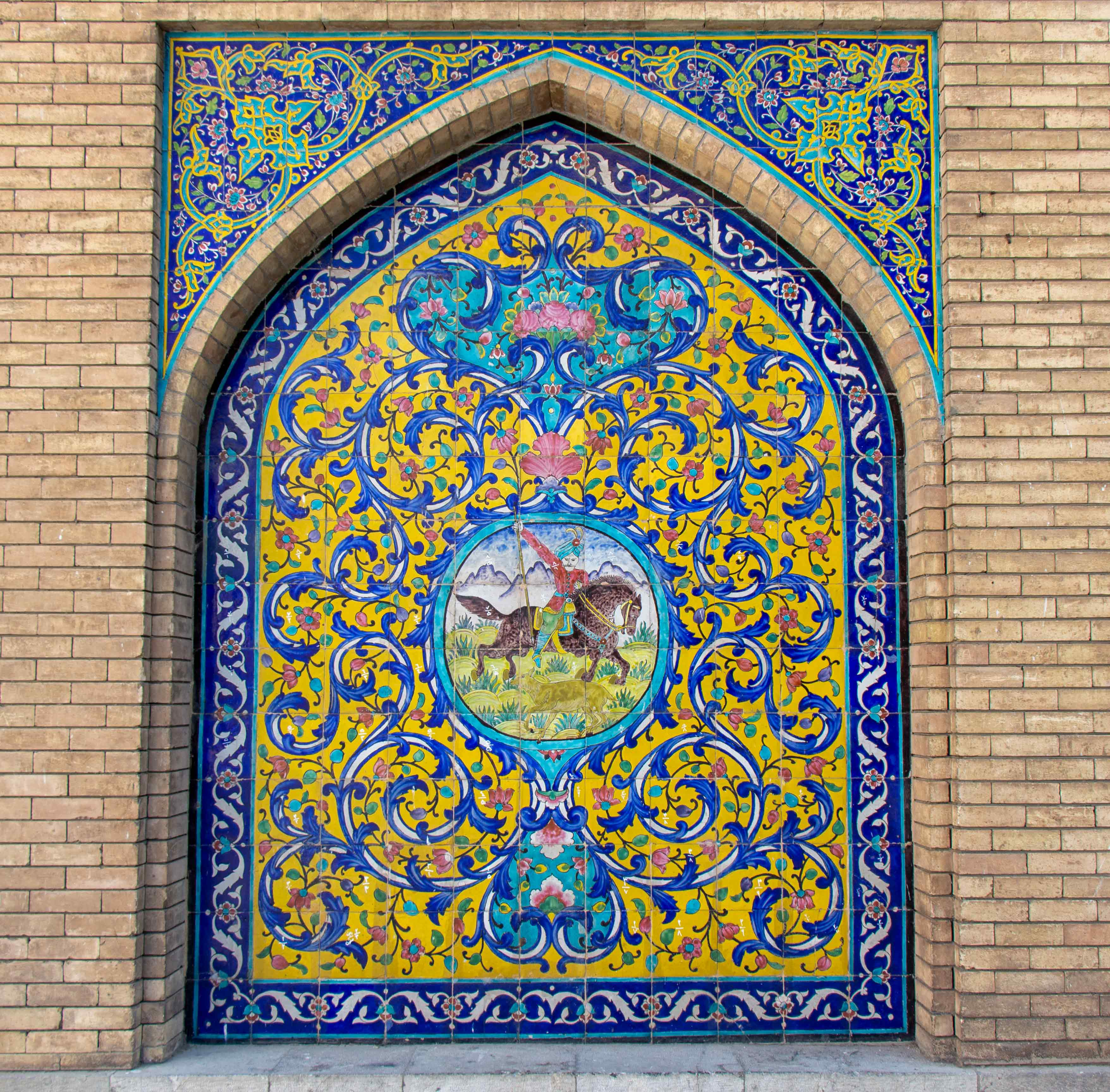
Tilings 9

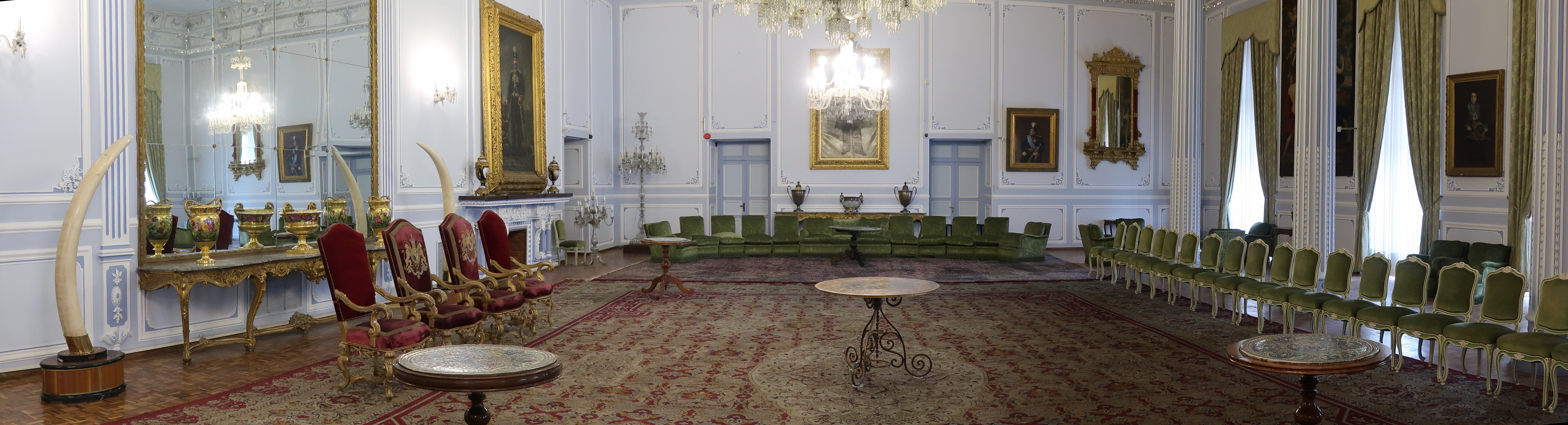
The Ivory Hall (Talar-e Adj)

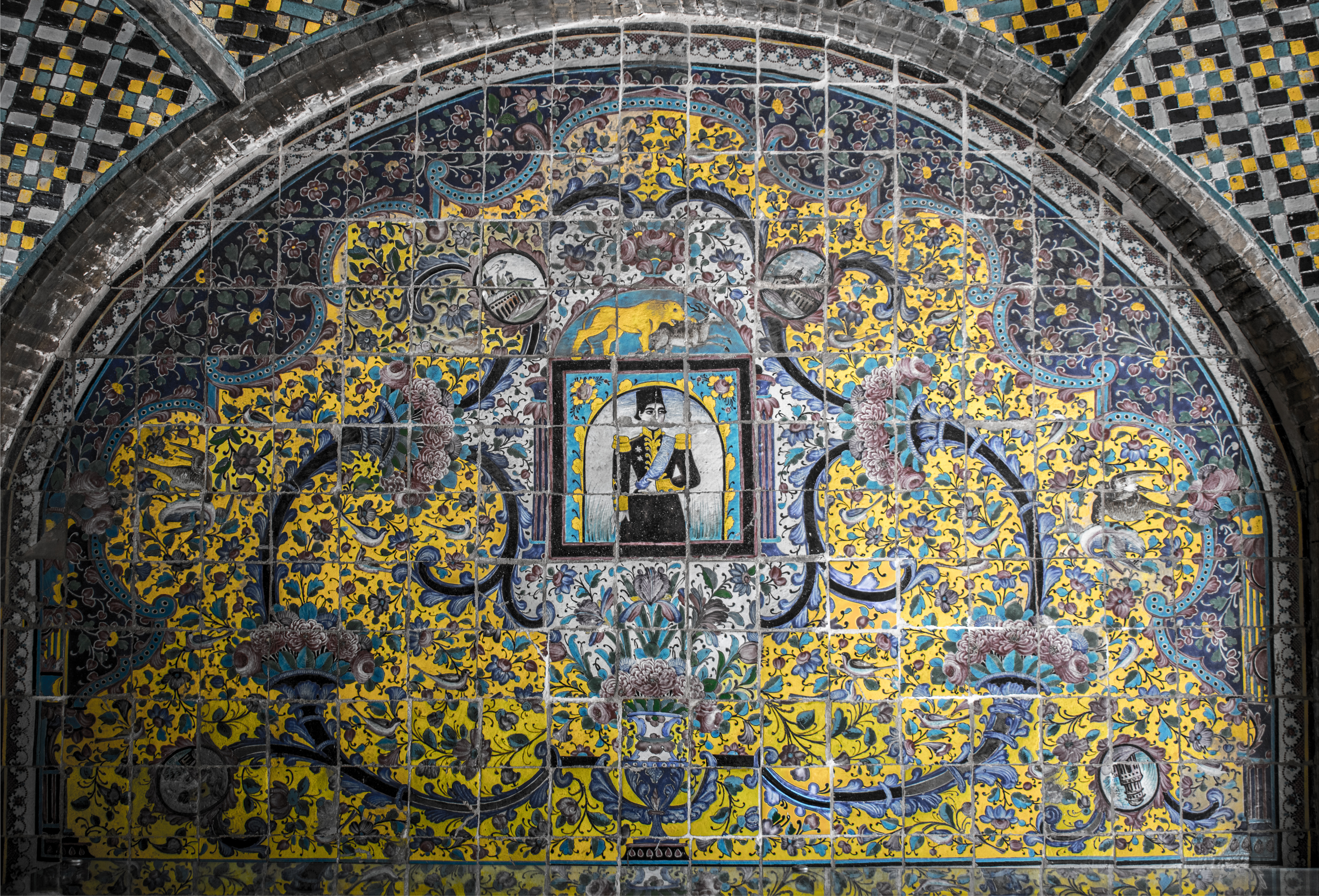
Tilings in the Karim Khani Nook

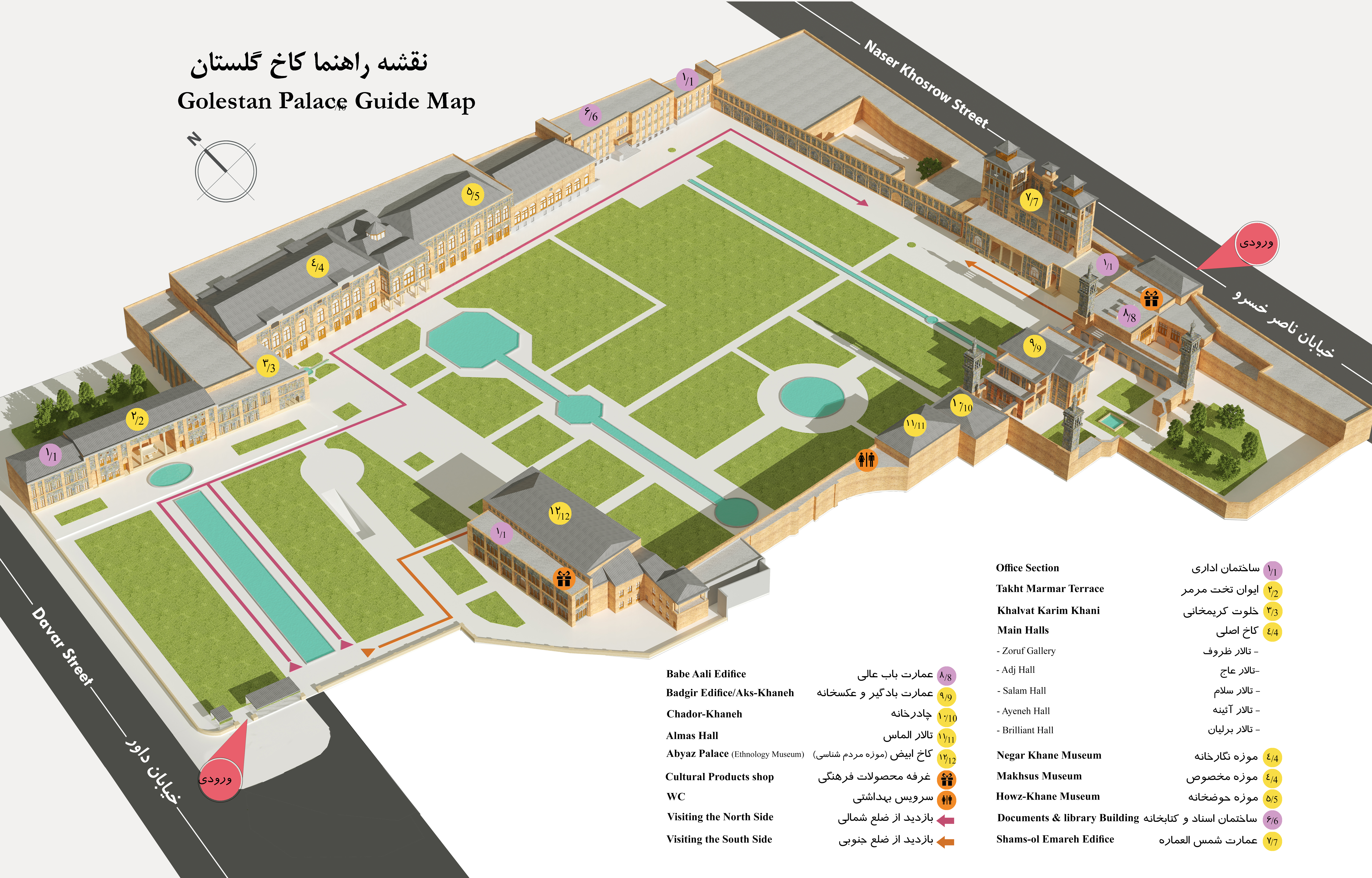
The map of Golestan Palace

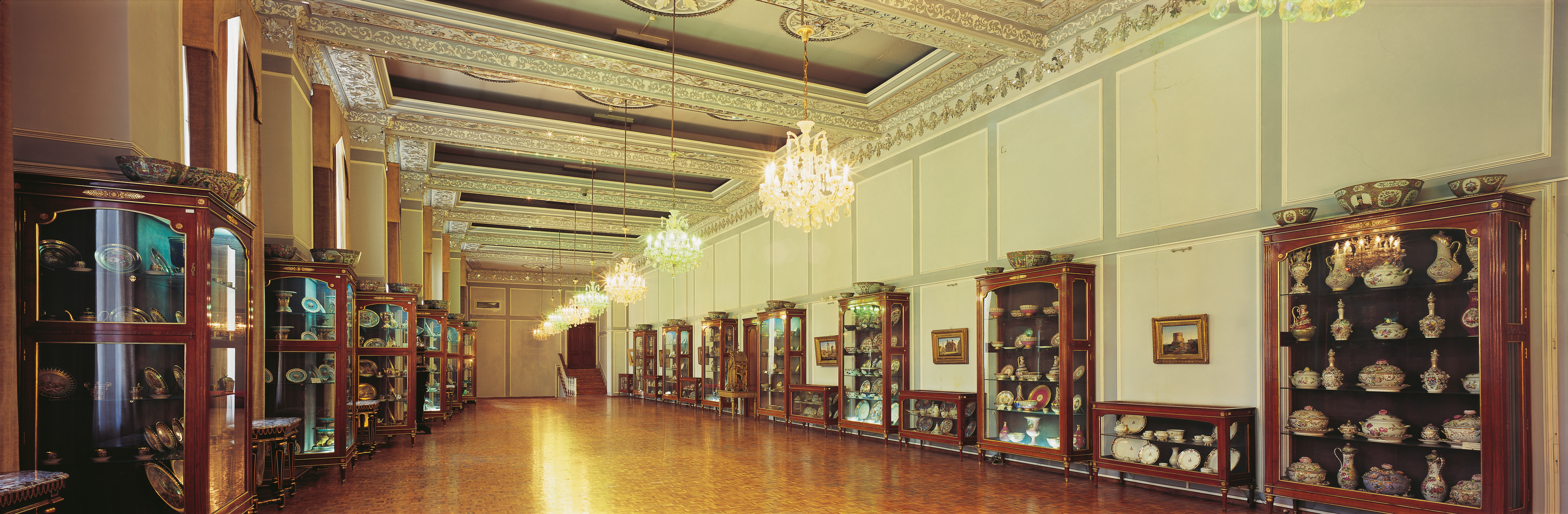
Containers' Hall (Talar-e Zoruf)

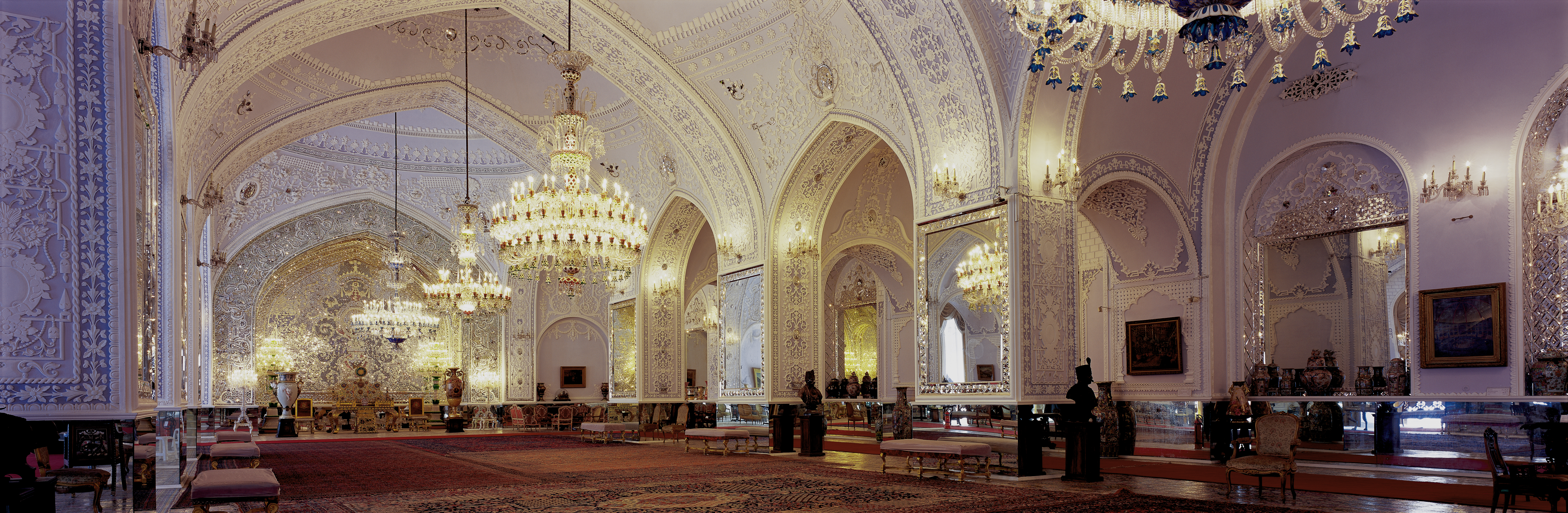
The Salam Hall

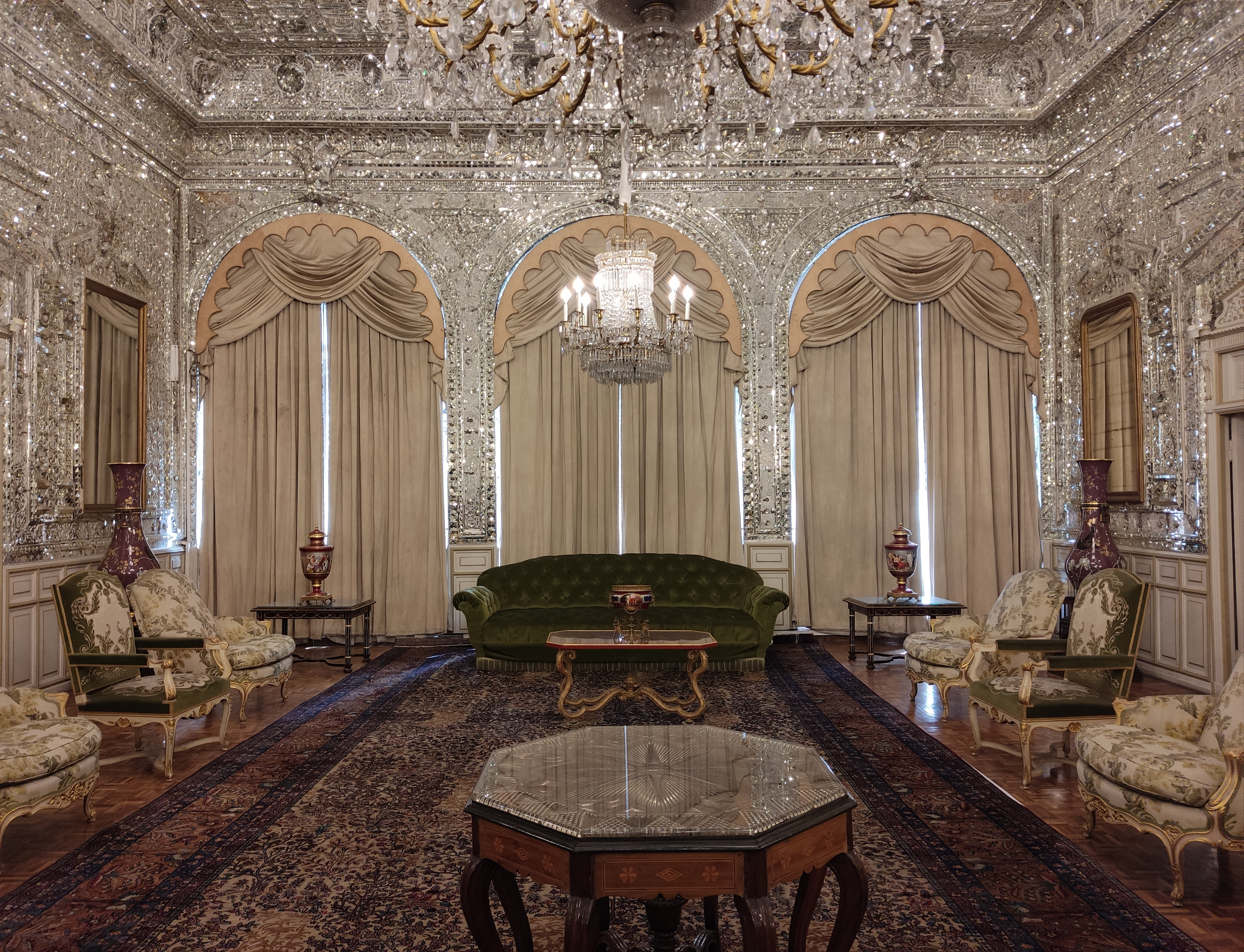
The Mirror Hall (Talar-e Aineh)

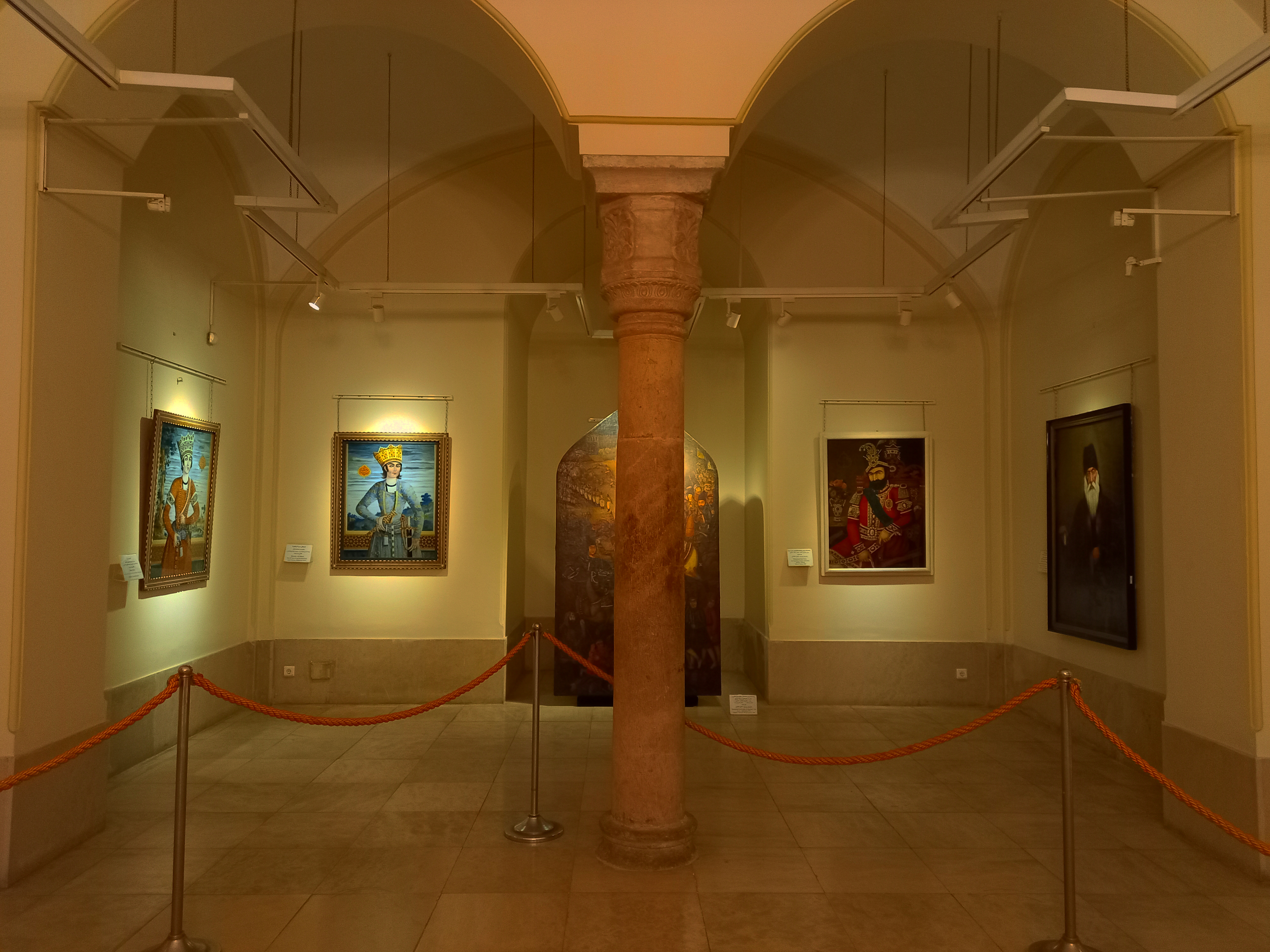
Museum Hall

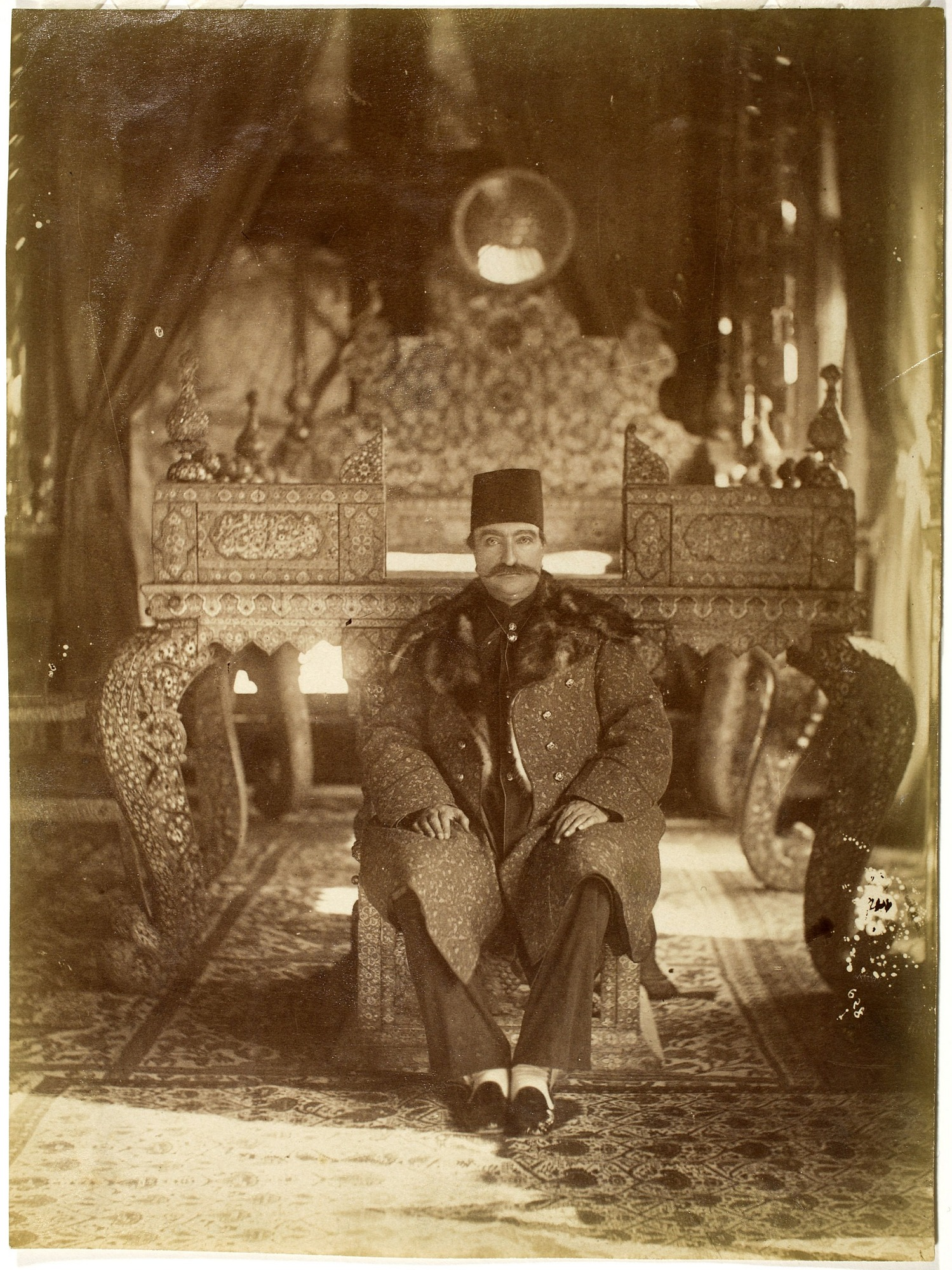
Naser al-Din Shah on the steps of the Sun Throne at the Mirror Hall

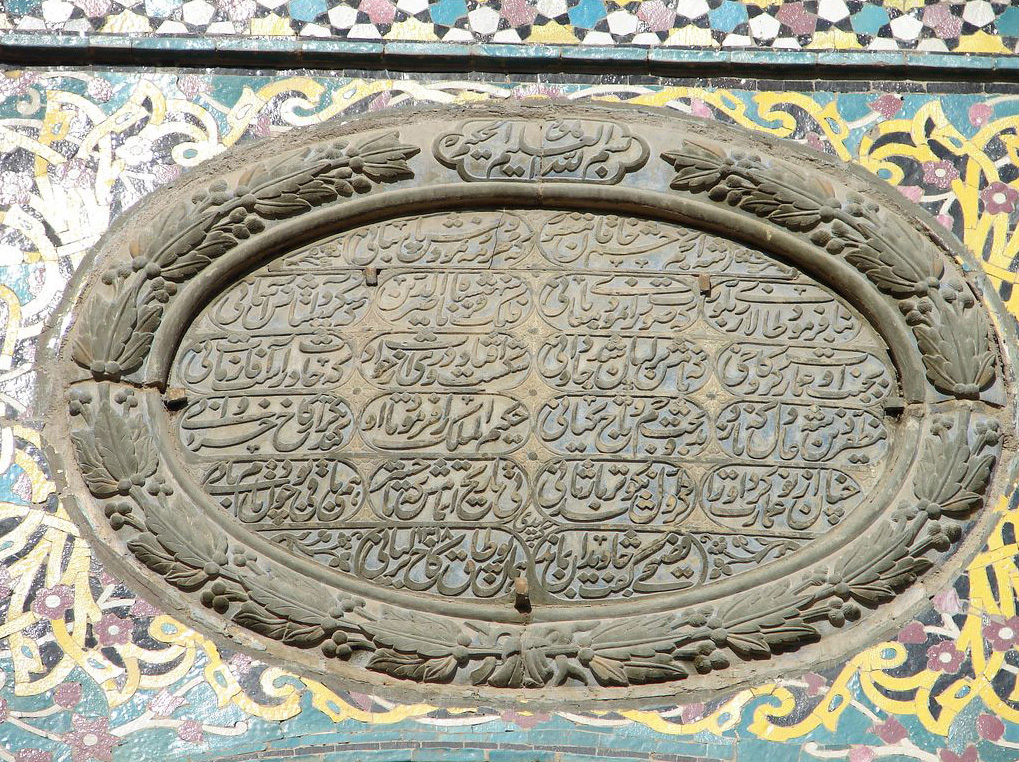
Stone inscription of the Brilliant Hall from the reign of Mozaffar ad-Din Shah Qajar

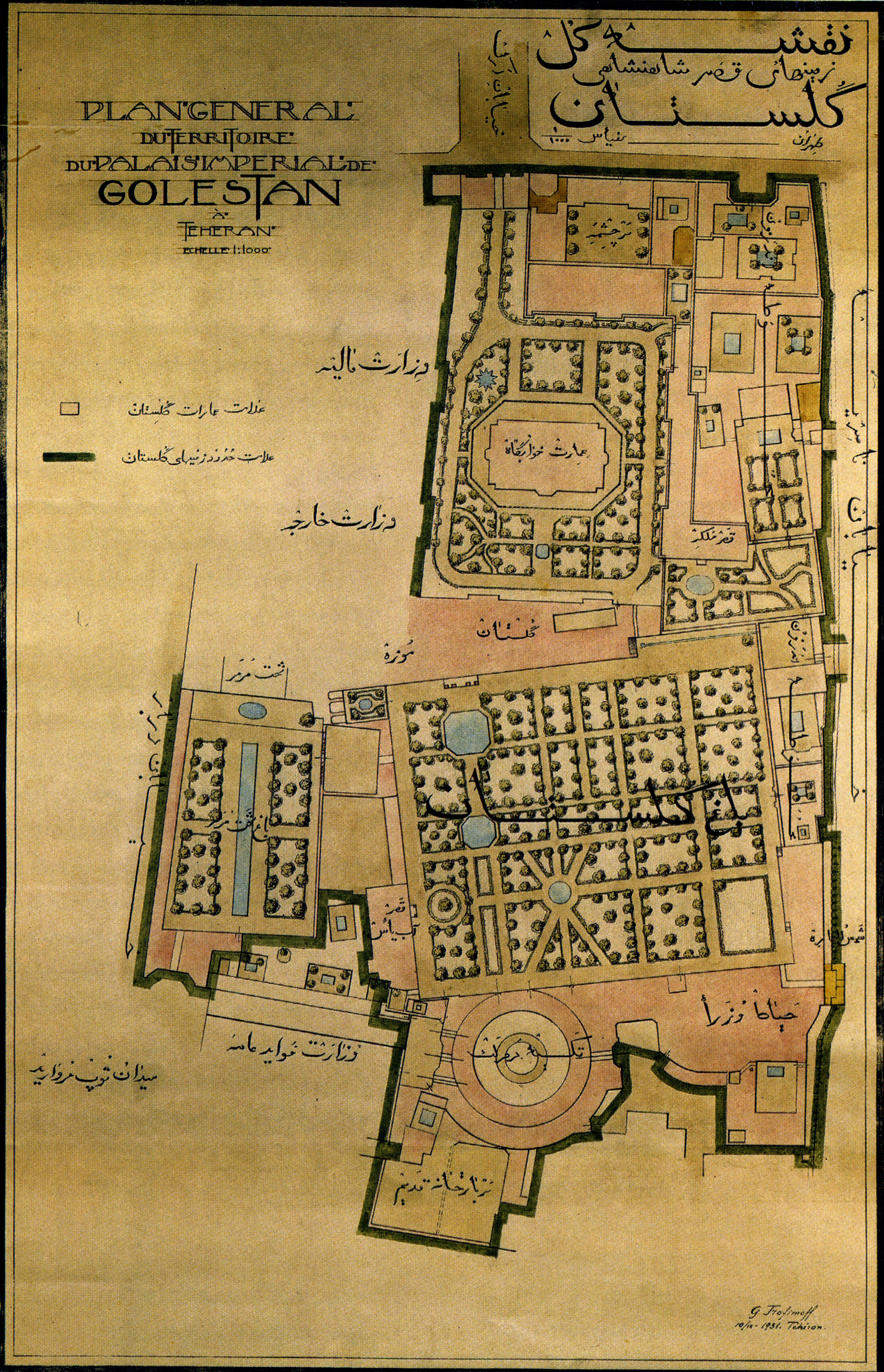
The map of Golestan palace, 1931

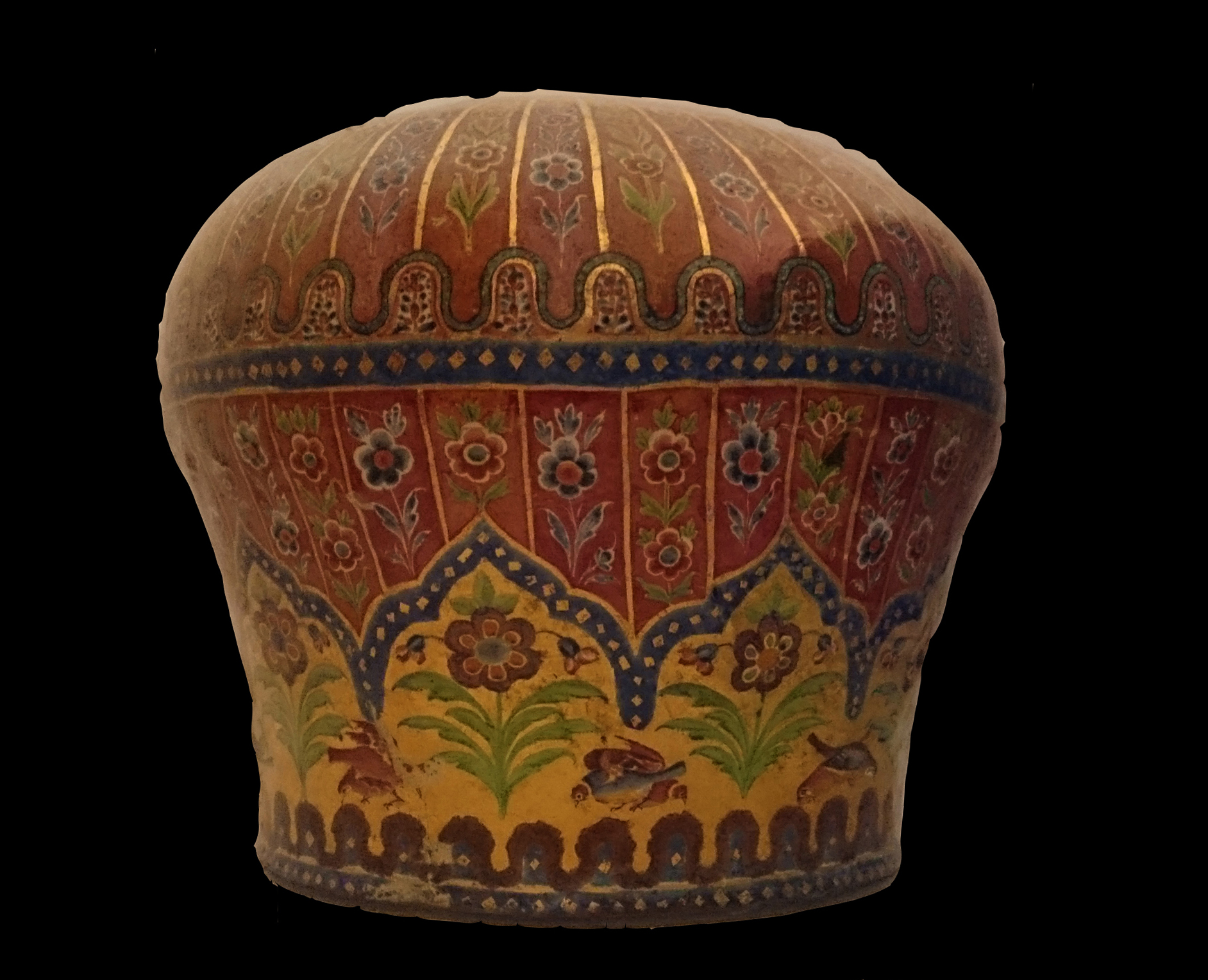
The crown of Agha Mohammad Khan Qajar

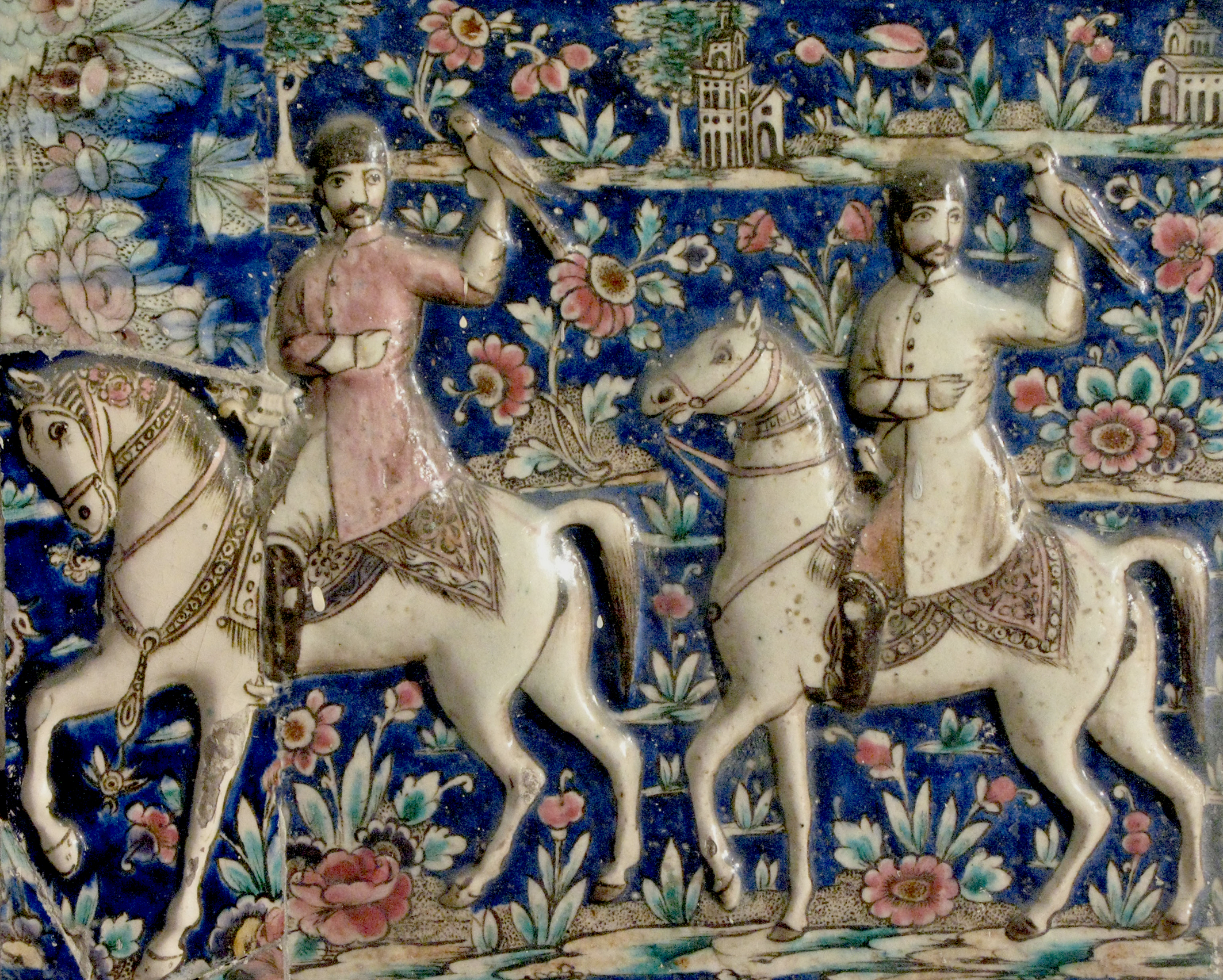
The tilings of the Museum Mansion

== See also ==
- Ferdows Garden
- Baharestan Palace
- Morvarid Palace
