= Jameh Mosque of Amol =

Shi'ite mosque in Amol, Mazandaran, Iran

Jāmeh Mosque of Amol
- مسجد جامع آمل
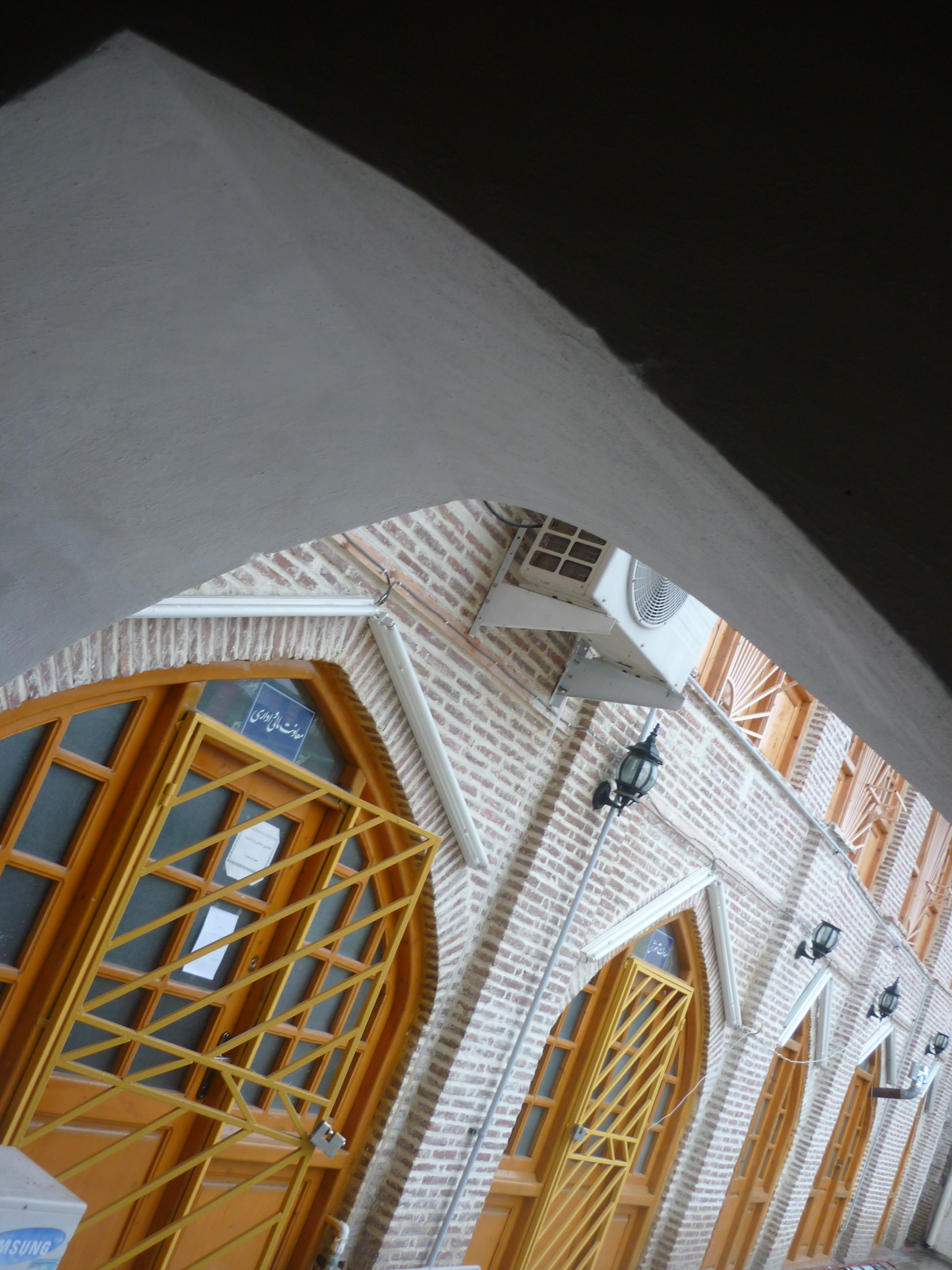
- The mosque in 2012

- Location of the mosque in Iran

Religion
- Affiliation: Shia Islam
- Ecclesiastical or organizational status: Friday mosque
- Status: Active

Location
- Location: Amol, Amol County, Mazandaran Province
- Country: Iran
- Interactive map of Jāmeh Mosque of Amol
- Coordinates: 38°04′52″N 46°17′25″E

Architecture
- Type: Mosque architecture
- Style: Abbasid; Safavid; Qajar
- Completed: 177 AH (793/794 CE) (prime); 1106 AH (1694/1695 CE) (vestibule); 1225 AH (1810/1811 CE) (reconstruction); 1335 AH (1916/1917 CE) (renovation)

Specifications
- Dome: One
- Dome height (outer): 10.42 m (34.2 ft)
- Materials: Bricks; marble; plaster; mortar; tiles; timber

Iran National Heritage List
- Official name: Jāmeh Mosque of Amol
- Type: Built
- Designated: 29 January 2008
- Reference no.: 20666
- Conservation organization: Cultural Heritage, Handicrafts and Tourism Organization of Iran

The Jāmeh Mosque of Amol (Persian: مسجد جامع آمل, romanized: Masjid-e-Jāmeh Amol; Arabic: جامع أمل) is a Shi'ite Friday mosque (Jāmeh), located in Amol, in the province of Mazandaran, Iran, adjacent to the Amol Sassanid Bazaar. Its primary structure dates to the first century AH and during the reign of the Qajar dynasty and Safavid dynasty renovation.

The mosque was added to the Iran National Heritage List on 29 January 2008, administered by the Cultural Heritage, Handicrafts and Tourism Organization of Iran.

== See also ==
- Shia Islam in Iran
- List of mosques in Iran
