= Esmail Jalayer =

Iranian painter (19th century)

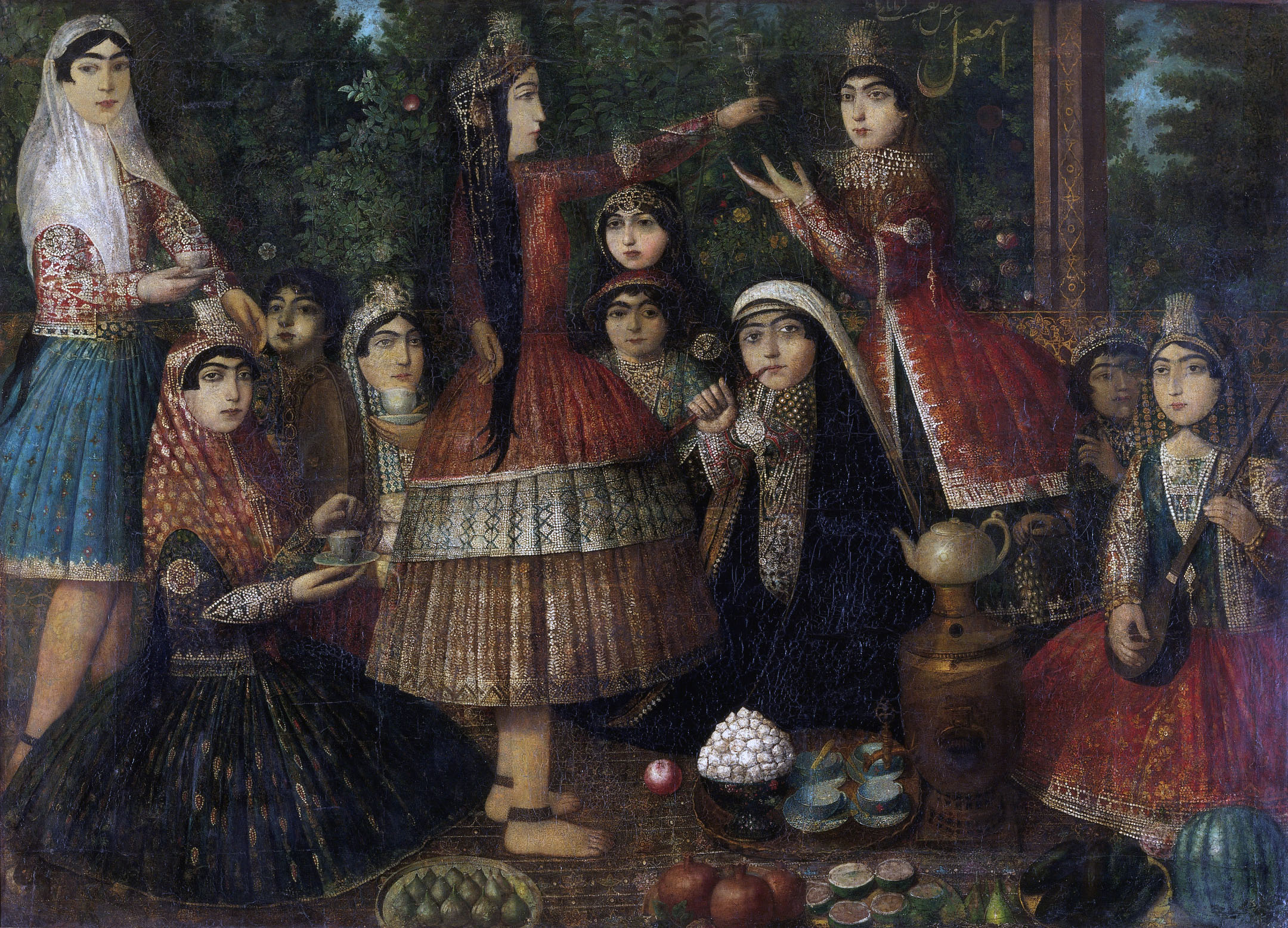
Ladies dancing around a Samovar by Esmail Jalayer, 1860

Esmail Jalayer (Persian: اسماعیل جلایر) was an Iranian painter active during the reign of Naser al-Din Shah Qajar (r. 1848–1896).

He was peculiarly well known for his works in two admired dissimilar classes of Qajar paintings. Irāni-sāzi (focusing on Iranian templates, sketching on face-related aspects, make-up, costume, and comparatively unchanged by European influences) and ṭabiʿat-sāzi (concentrating on fauna and flora in a European realistic mode, targeting at realism).

Esmail was the son of Haj Mohammad Khan Jalayer Kalati from a former and renowned family of Khorasan but there are no accurate details about the dates of his birth and death or location of the interment. Furthermore, just a few of his works have been written a date: one is a portrait of Naser al-Din Shah in watercolor, dated 1862, others include a depiction of a scene from the Anglo-Persian War (1856) companions and those of the founders and luminaries of Sufi sects and dervishes.

== Gallery ==
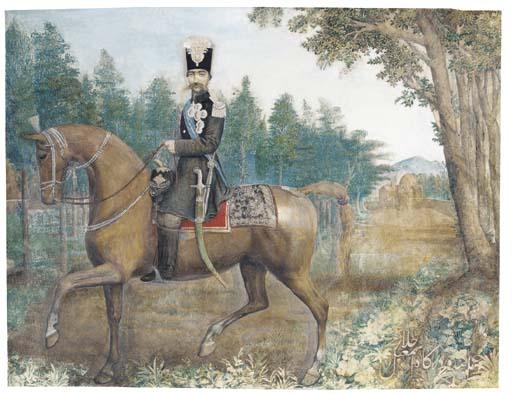
Portrait of Naser al-Din Shah Qajar on horseback, mid 19th century

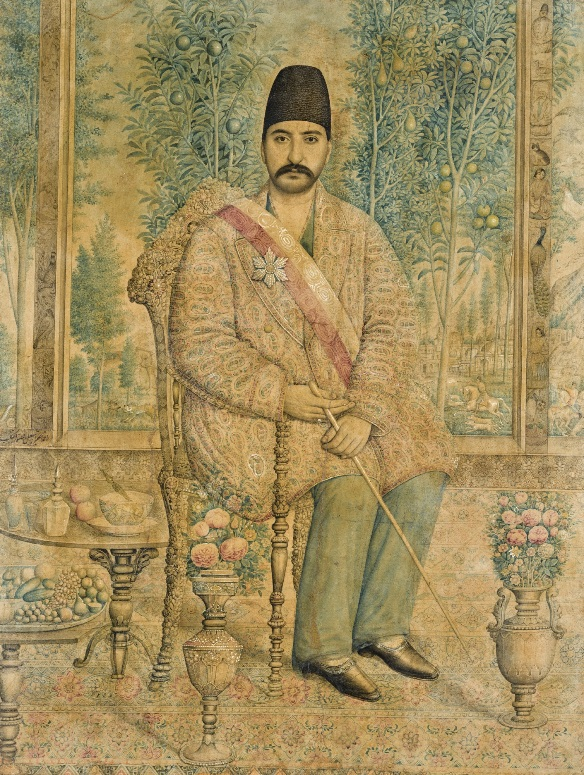
Portrait of Mirza Ali Asghar Khan Amin al-Soltan, signed by Isma’il Jalayir, c. 1880

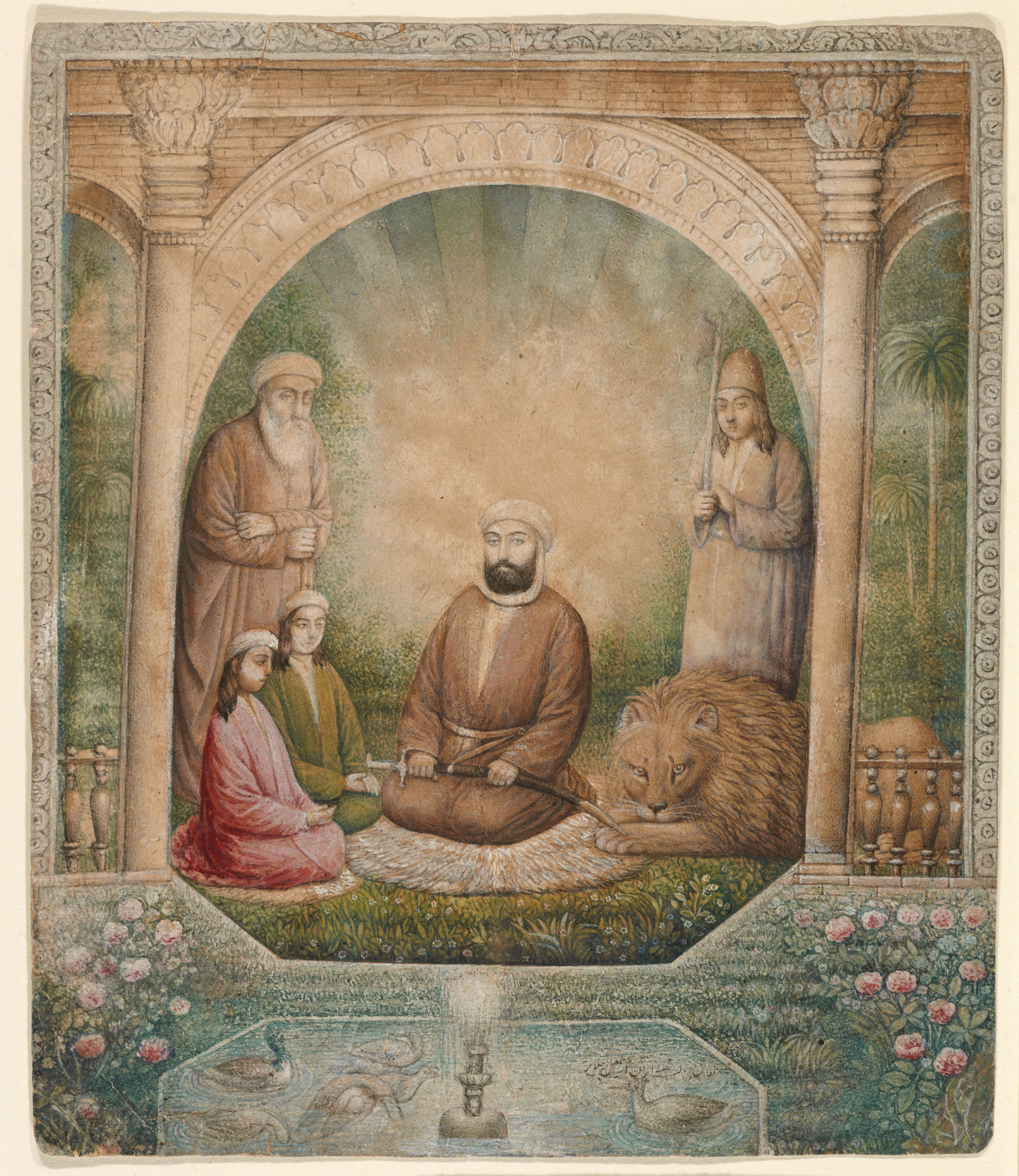
Portrait of Ali, Hasan, Husayn, and the Sufi Leader Shah Nimatullah Wali, second half of 19th century

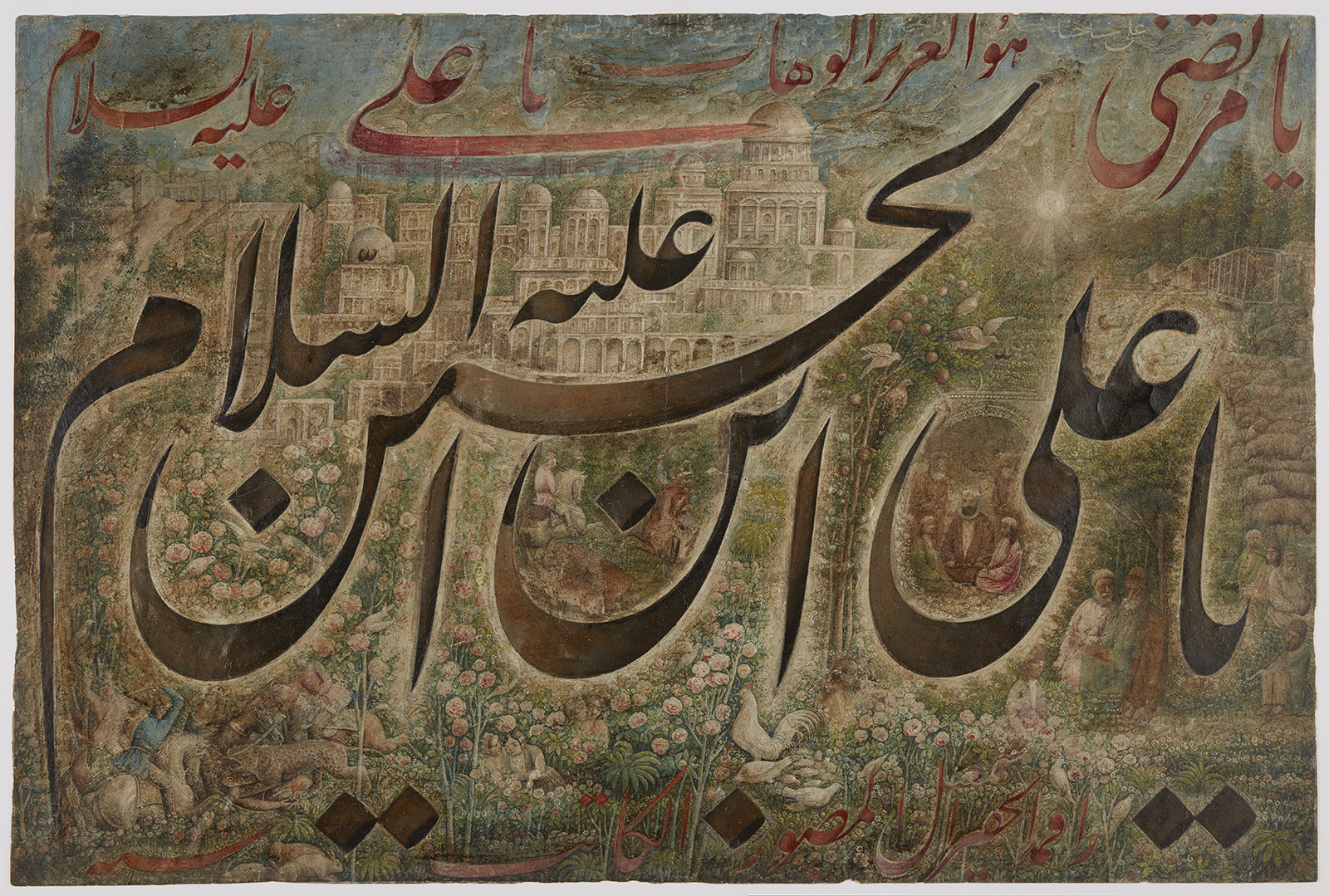
Calligraphic Painting, c. 1860–70
