= Qajar art =

Artforms of the Qajar dynasty of Iran

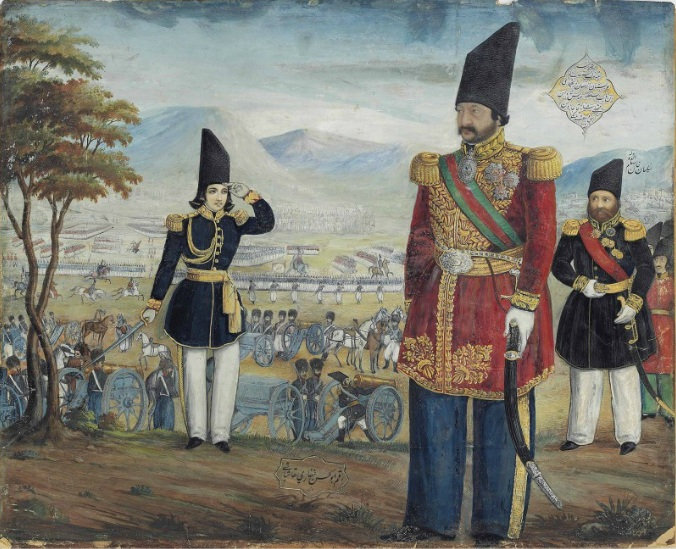
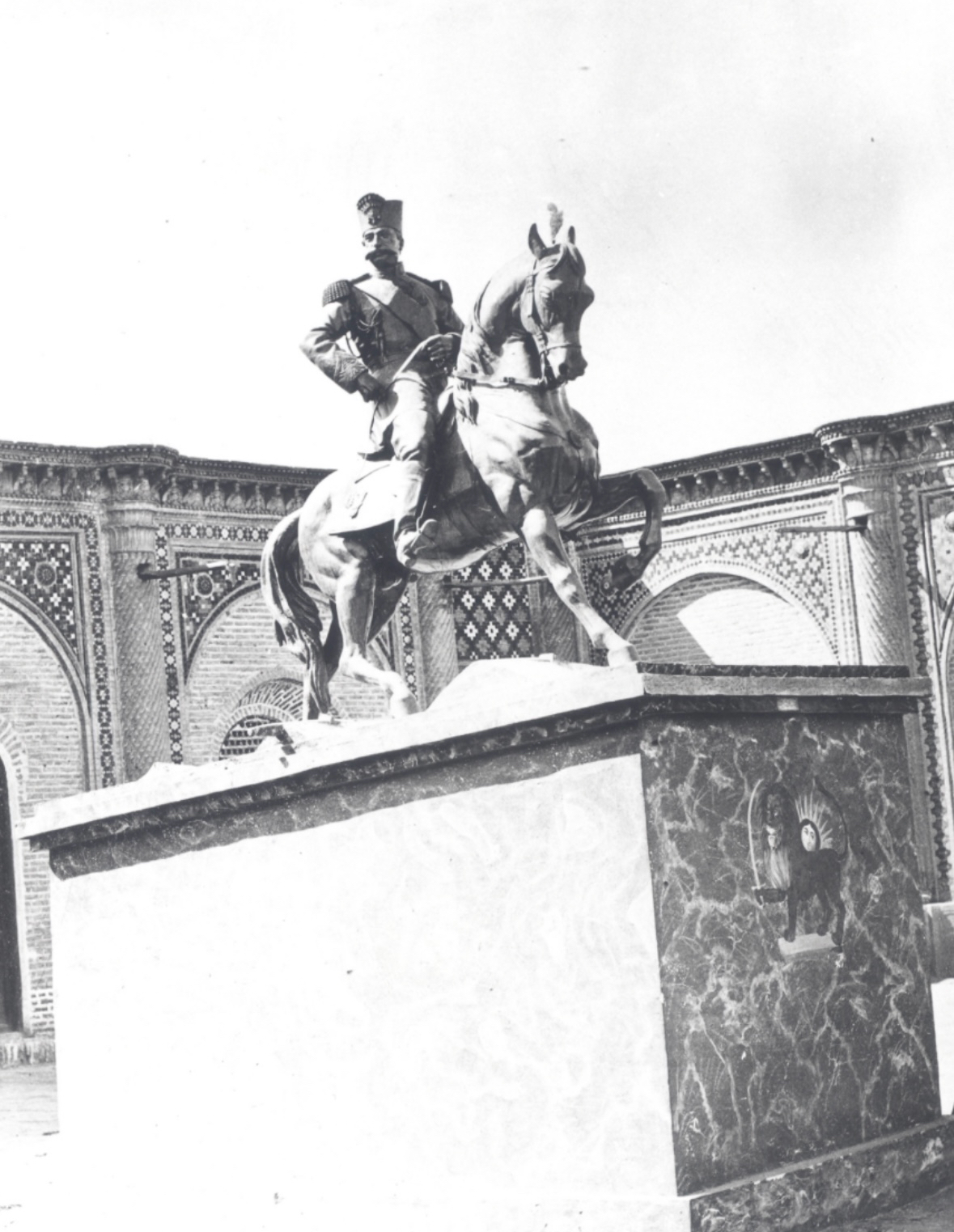
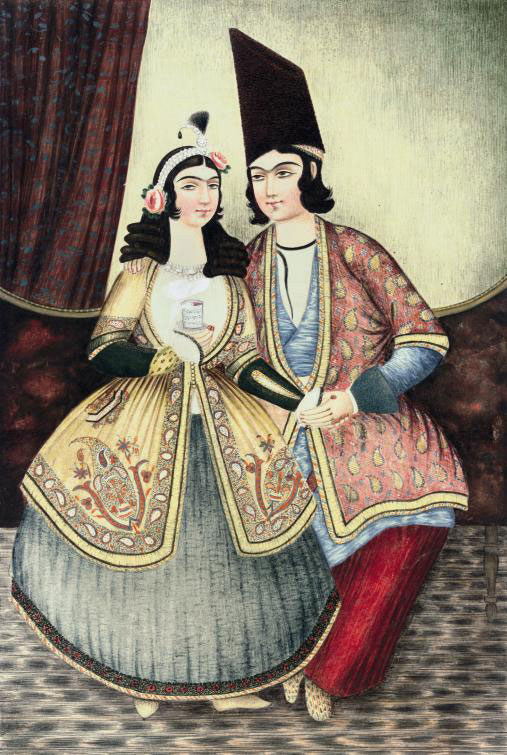
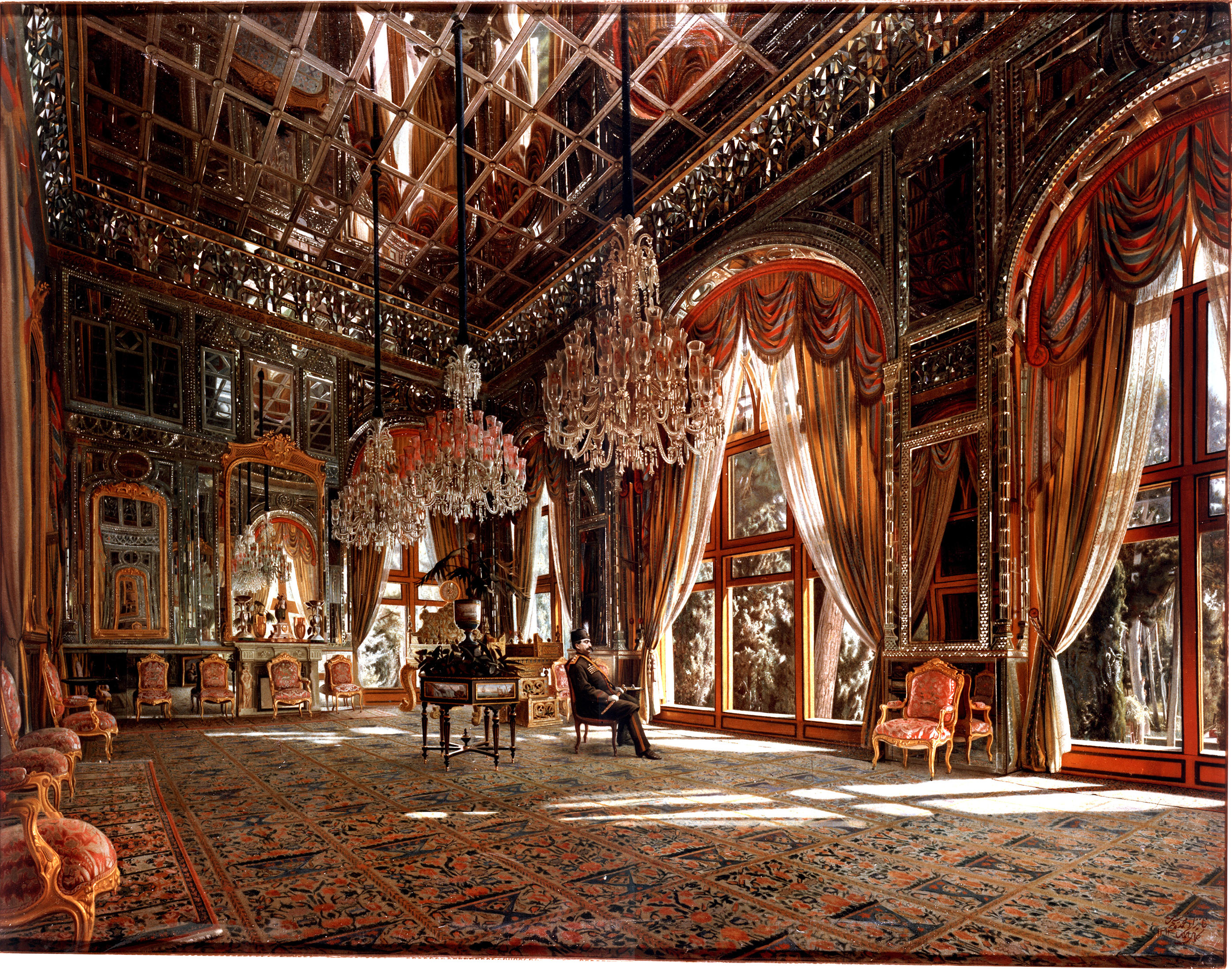
- From top left to bottom right: Gouache painting (by Abu'l-Hasan Sani al-Mulk, c. 1851); Equestrian Statue of Naser al-Din Shah (by Mirza Ali Akbar, 1888); Young mukhanna and girl, (early Qajar Iran); Mirror Hall (by Kamal-ol-molk, 1876)
- Years active: 18th–20th centuries
- Location: Iran

Qajar art was the architecture, paintings, and other art forms produced during the Qajar era, from 1781 to 1925, in Iran (Persia).

The boom in artistic expression that occurred during the Qajar era was a side effect of the period of relative peace that accompanied the rule of Agha Mohammad Khan and his descendants. With his ascension, the bloody turmoil of the 18th century came to a close and made it possible for peacetime arts to flourish in Iran.

== Painting ==
Most notably, Qajar art is recognisable for its distinctive style of portraiture.

=== Origins and influences ===
The roots of traditional Qajar painting can be found in the style of painting that arose during the preceding Safavid empire. During this era, there was a considerable amount of European influence on Iranian culture, especially in the arts of the royal and aristocratic classes. European art was undergoing a period of realism and this can be seen in the depiction of objects especially by Qajar artists. European influence is evident in the preeminent position and prestige of oil painting. While oil paintings had been par for the course during previous periods of Iranian art, it was the influence of the European masters of oil portraiture, like Rubens and Rembrandt, that raised it to the highest level. Heavy application of paint and dark, rich, saturated colors are elements of Qajar painting that owe their influences directly to the European style.

=== Development of painting style ===
While the depiction of inanimate objects and still lifes is seen to be very realistic in Qajar painting, the depiction of human beings is decidedly idealised. This is especially evident in the portrayal of Qajar royalty, where the subjects of the paintings are very formulaically placed and situated to achieve a desired effect.

==== Royal portraiture ====
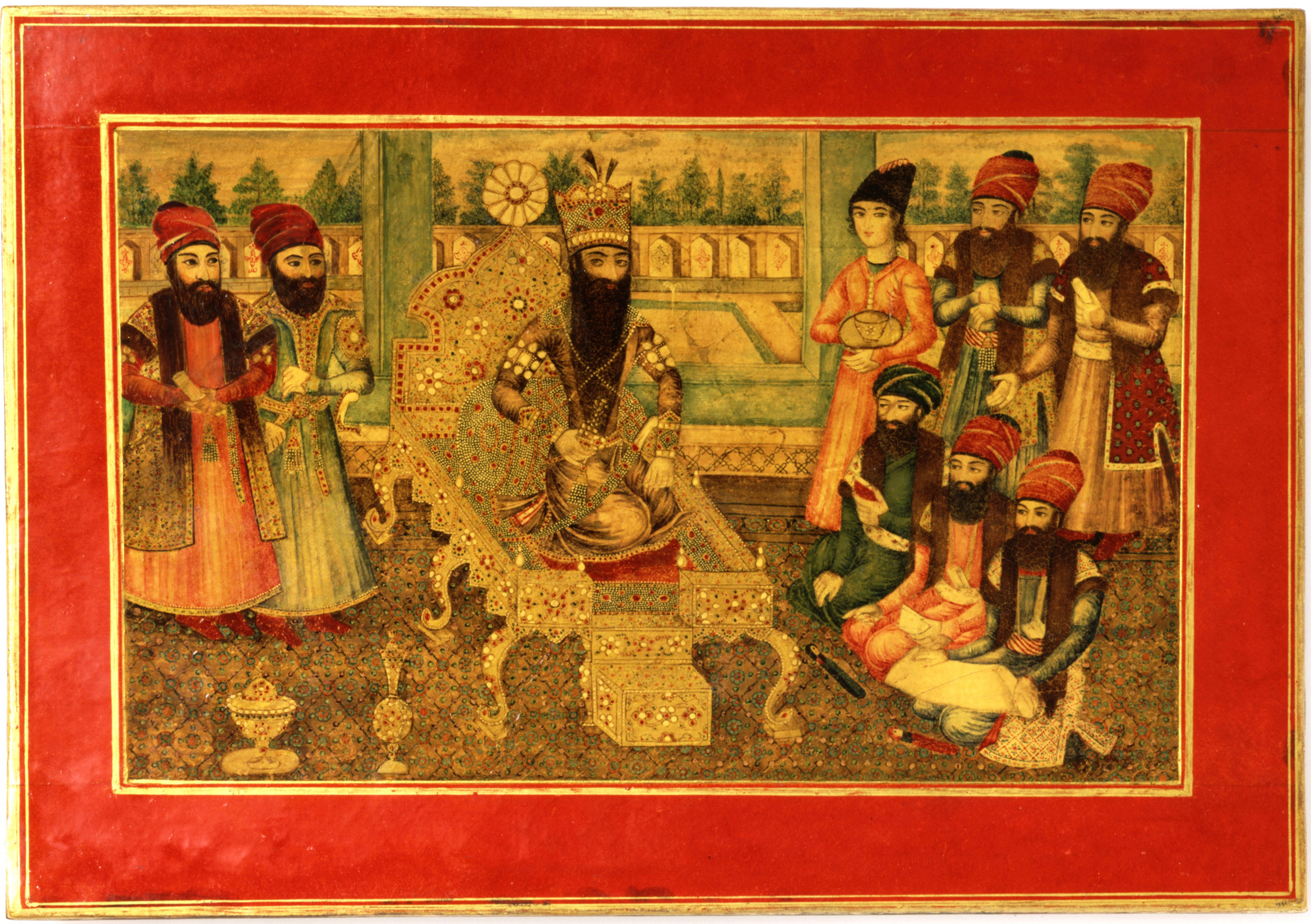
Fath Ali Shah depicted on the Peacock Throne surrounded by ministers, painting circa 1835

Most famous of the Qajar artworks are the portraits that were made of the various Iranian shahs. Each ruler, and many of their sons and other relatives, commissioned official portraits of themselves either for private use or public display. The most famous of these are the myriad portraits which were painted of Fath Ali Shah Qajar, who, with his narrow waist, long black bifurcated beard and deepest dark eyes, has come to exemplify the Romantic image of the great Oriental Ruler. Many of these paintings were by the artist Mihr 'Ali. While the portraits were executed at various points throughout the life of the Shah, they adhere to a canon in which the distinctive features of the ruler are emphasized. Portraits exist of Fath Ali Shah in a very wide assortment of situations, from the armor-clad warrior king to the flower smelling gentleman, but all are similar in their depiction of the Shah, differing only slightly, usually due to the specific artist of the portrait. It is only appropriate that this particular Shah be so immortalized in this style, as it was under his rule as the second Qajar shah that the style truly flourished. One reason for this were the stronger and stronger diplomatic ties that the Qajar rulers were nurturing with European powers.

As the Shangri La Center for Islamic Arts and Culture notes, "Later Iranian art of the Afsharid (1736–96), Zand (1750–94) and Qajar (1779–1924) periods is distinguished by the depiction of life-size figures, whether in stone relief, tilework or painting on canvas. In the latter category, Qajar rulers like Fath 'Ali Shah (r. 1797–1834) perpetuated a widespread interest in large-scale portraiture (even sending portraits to political rivals)."

While Fath Ali Shah himself never visited Europe, many portraits of him were sent with envoys in the effort to convey the imperial majesty of the Qajar court. During the reign of Naser ad-Din Shah photography became much more important, and portraiture, while still used for official purposes, fell gradually out of favor. In addition, as Naser ad-Din Shah was the first Iranian monarch to visit Europe, the official sending of portraits was left by the wayside, a relic of times gone by.

==== Other portraiture ====
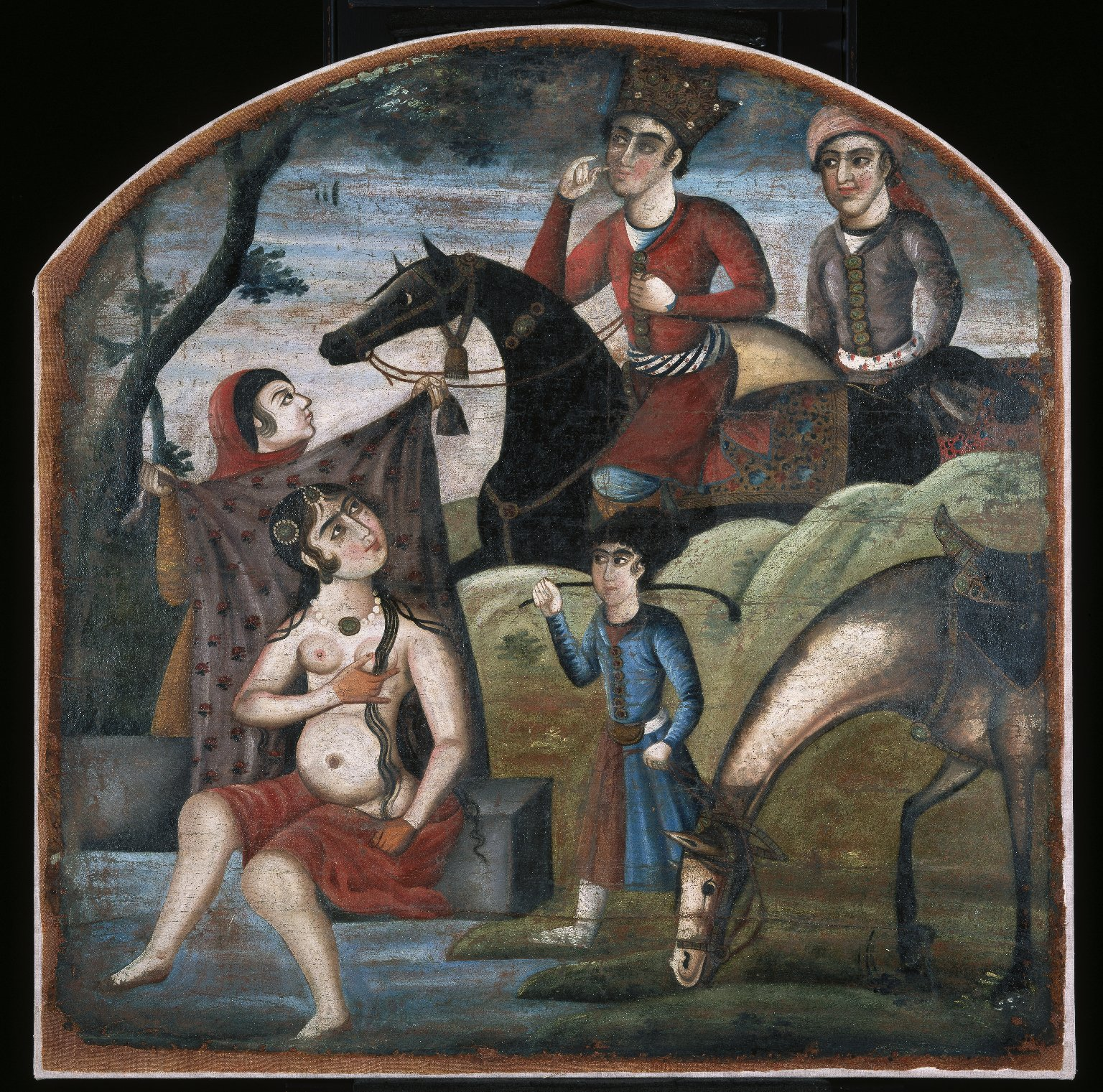
Khosrow Discovers Shirin Bathing, From Pictorial Cycle of Eight Poetic Subjects, mid 18th century. Brooklyn Museum.

The depiction of nonroyal persons also has a very important place in the explanation and understanding of Qajar art. While naturally not commoners, the subjects of these portraits were often minor princes (of which there were many!), the grandsons, nephews, and great-nephews of the ruling or previously ruling Shahs. These princes, with the wealth and position of their families, had very little else to do but contribute to the arts, so their patronage was certainly less than detrimental to the arts of the time. Often, portraits of this class would be commissioned as depictions of family groups, depicting the male, an idealized, nubile wife, and their perfectly formed child. Other times, they would be in the form of a royal portrait, depicting solely the male commissioner, but with subtle variations making it clear that the sitter is not a Royal. One way that this was accomplished was through a cartouche that was displayed next to the head of each portrait's subject, clarifying who was being depicted, and any relevant titles (such as Soltān, shāhzādeh, &c.). For the ruling head of Iran, this cartouche is fairly regulated, ("al-soltān Official name Shāh Qājār"), while for anyone else, it may include a longer name, a lesser title or a short genealogy.

===== Depiction of women =====
After the spread of Islam in the 600s, the depiction of women in the arts decreased compared to the art movements of the Sasanian era. Portraiture of women started to be considered as a dishonorable practice towards women, based on the Islamic traditions of womanhood and modesty. The trend has changed with the arrival of Mongol invasions in Iran. Traditionally, female veiling was not as strict among Turko-Mongol tribes, as prescribed by ancient traditions and the Islamisation of society in Iran. Likewise, Mongol women, due to their nomad lifestyle, were conditioned to lead a physically active life, making heavy veiling unpractical. Tribal women were also more politically active, where specifically the lineage of women empowered Timurid Dynasty. Consequently, due to the influences of Mongols and expanding ties with Europe, where Italian renaissance was at its peak, Iranian artists rethought their attitude towards the painting of women. Whereas with time, female nudity and eroticism in painting became a part of Iranian visual culture.

Gender was often blurred in early Qajar Iran paintings, displaying similarities in body and facial features between men and women who were illustrated to be beautiful in many paintings. Young males and females were often linked to the object of desire. The appearance of young beardless men was called "Mukhannas". It was not until the 19th century when females were depicted as more individualized with distinct feminine facial and body features which ultimately led to the disappearance of the mukhanna, the male object of desire. 19th century Qajar art also brought the emergence of the bare-breasted woman. Examples of the bare breast would be seen through a dress for fetishistic pleasure and become a major theme in Qajar paintings. These bare-breasted women were portrayed as angels, European women, or women of pleasure such as acrobats or musicians. Some paintings include a portrayal of Mary and baby Jesus. Eventually, the bare breast led to an indication of womanhood.

The posture and positions women were placed in these paintings help tell a story. Women often held objects such as mirrors, fruit, or wine to represent beauty and pleasure. These representations go in hand with Persian poetry. With Persian literature in mind, occasional paintings featured women with an "outward gaze" which represents "directly addressing the reader" and is seen in many narrative paintings from Khosrow and Shirin, Yusuf and Zulaykha, and Shaykh San'an. In contrast to traditional postures and positions of women in 19th-century Qajar art, was a common female representation of women gracefully upside down on their hands on a knife. This was interpreted as a rejection to a social order which is represented in folk narratives in both pictorial and literary representations to dismiss the stereotype of passive Iranian women.

====== Female creativity ======
Though not well-documented, women have contributed to the 19th-century art heritage of Iran. Due to social, cultural, and religious constraints, art samples created by women were rarely preserved, since society, in general, didn't encourage female self-expression. Qajar women, especially from upper-class families, led creatively and culturally rich lives. Many of them were ambitious writers, poets, artists, calligraphers, religious leaders, and also, activists by the end of the century. "Women's Worlds in Qajar Iran" is a 21st-century-established digital archive dedicated to recording 19th-century Iranian women's lives and their input into cultural heritage.

Shahs' harems, in turn, were of considerable importance in regard to women's opportunity to create and promote their art. Harem represented a femicentric space, where women were able to freely exchange and share ideas, not influenced by hierarchal submission to men in 19th-century Iran, experiencing levels of autonomy. It was a place from where female creativity arose.

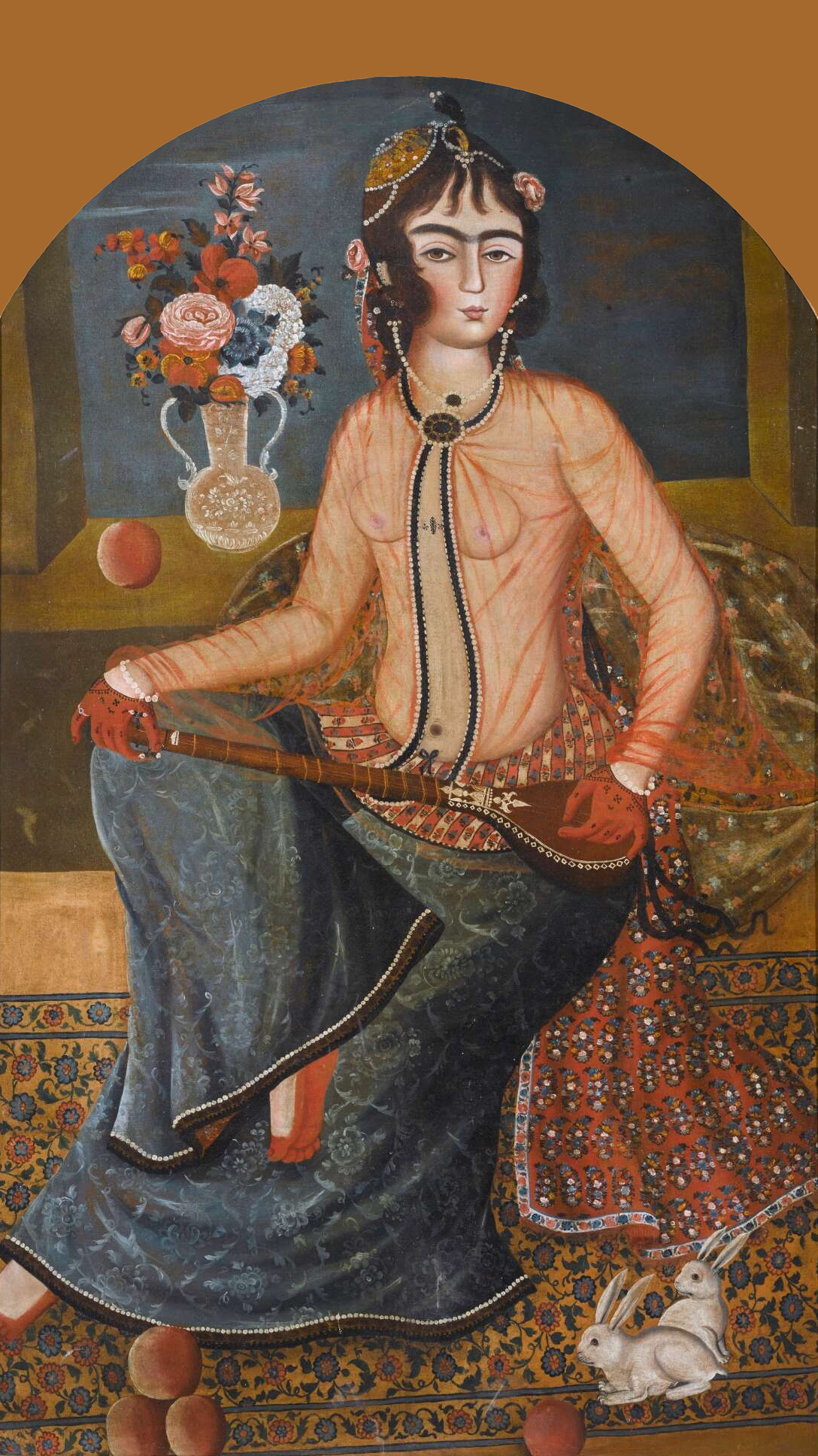
Woman with setar or dutar

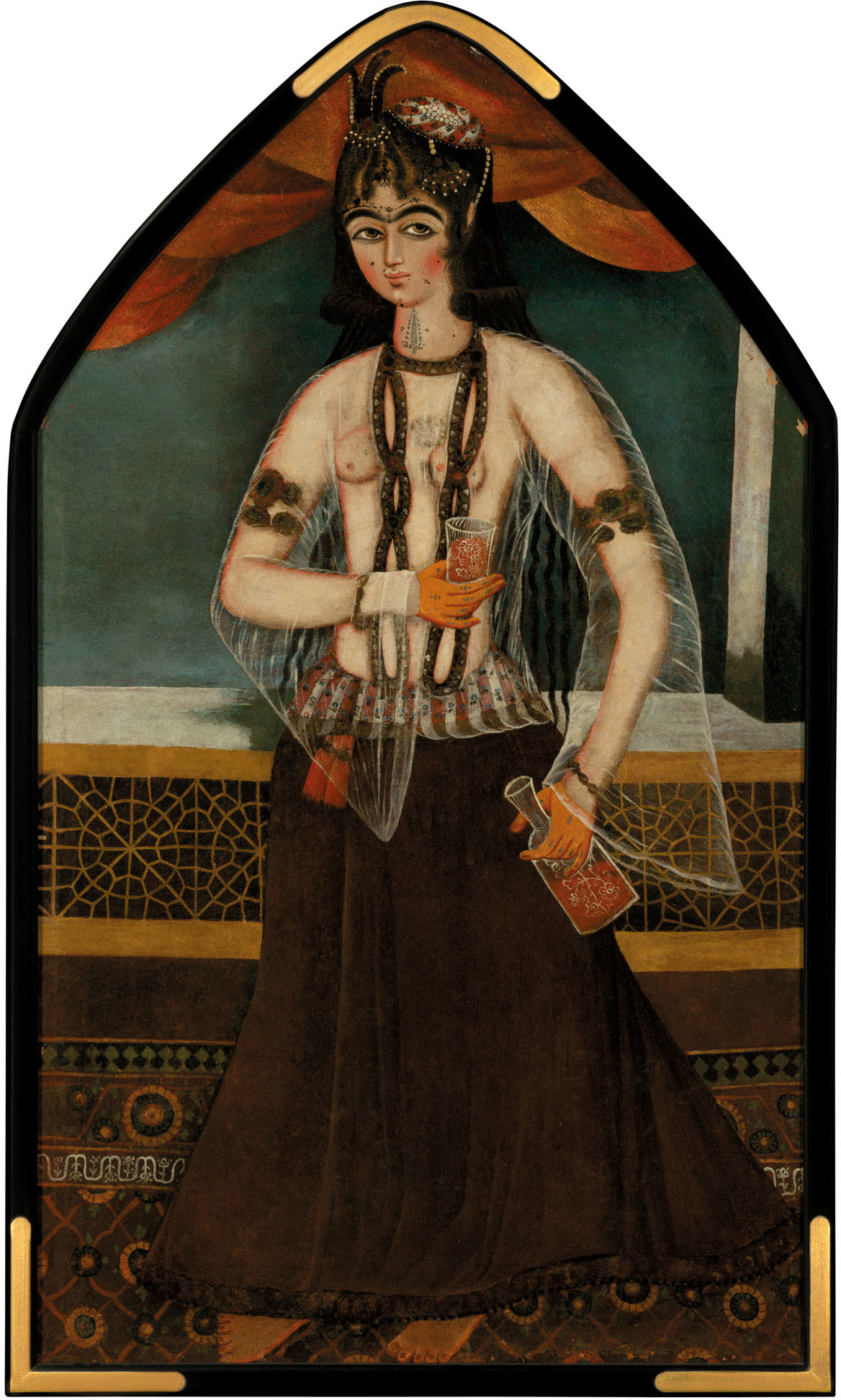

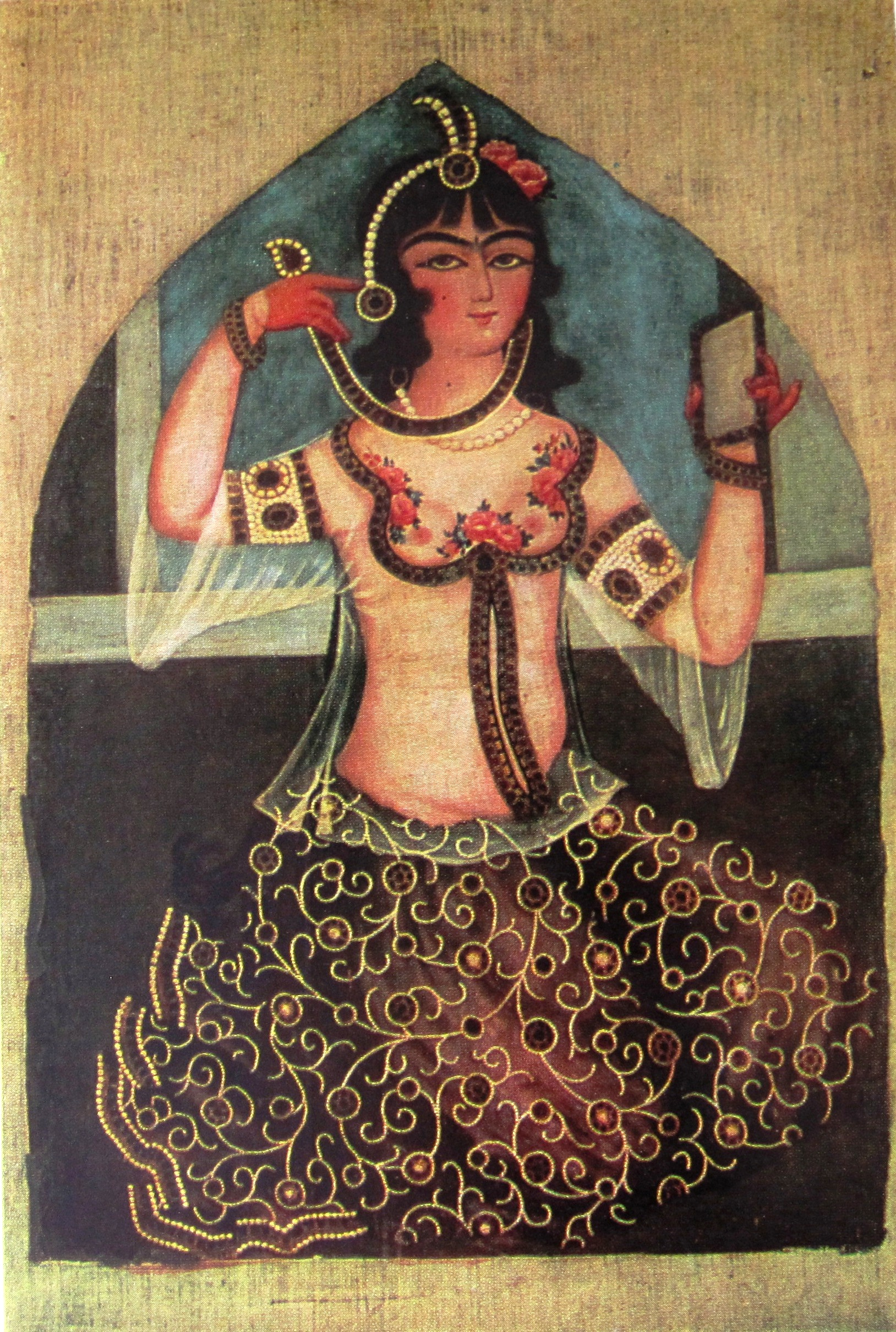
18th-century Qajar art. Girl with mirror, Museum of Georgia

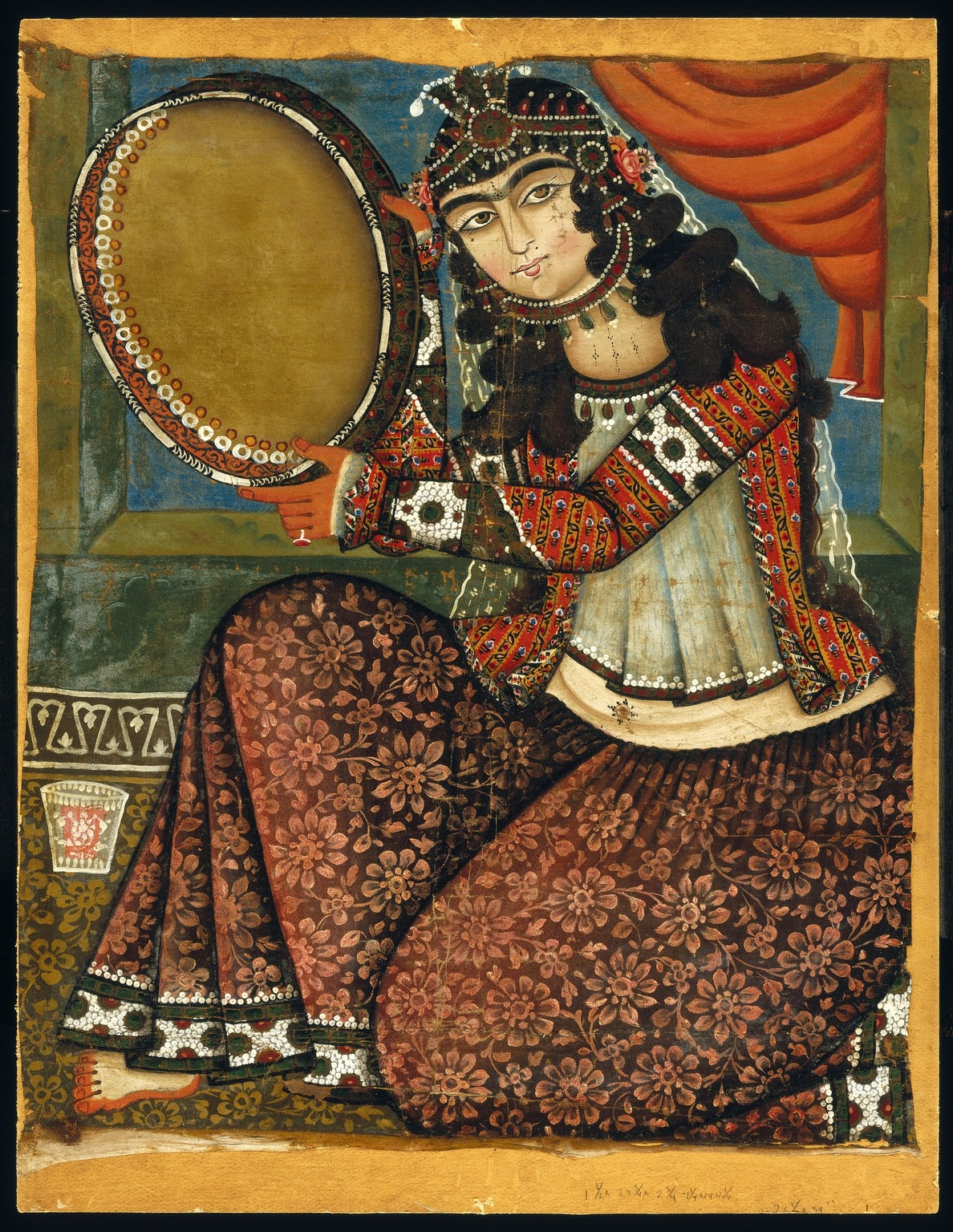
Woman playing a daf

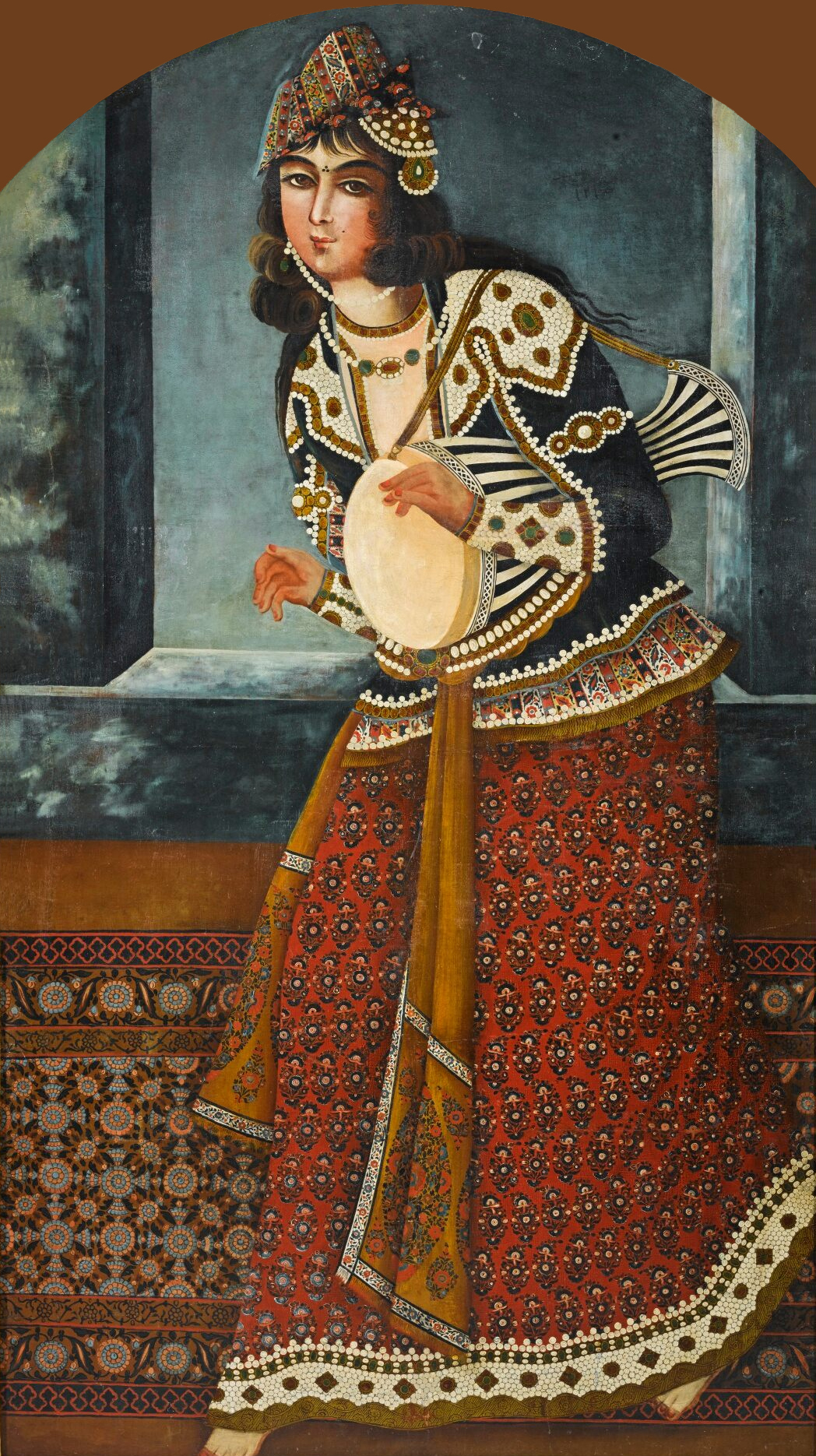
Woman playing a zarb

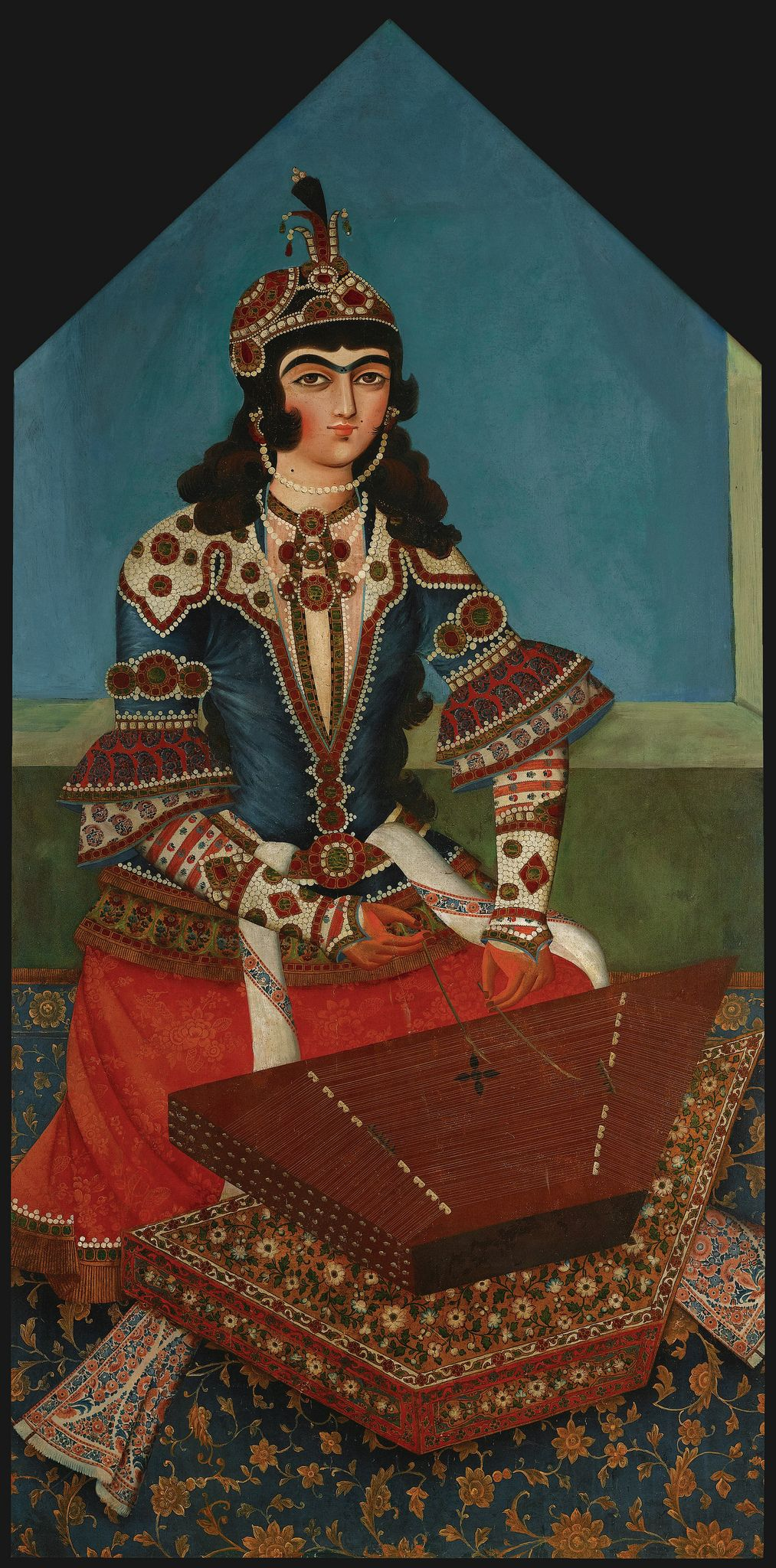
Woman playing a santur

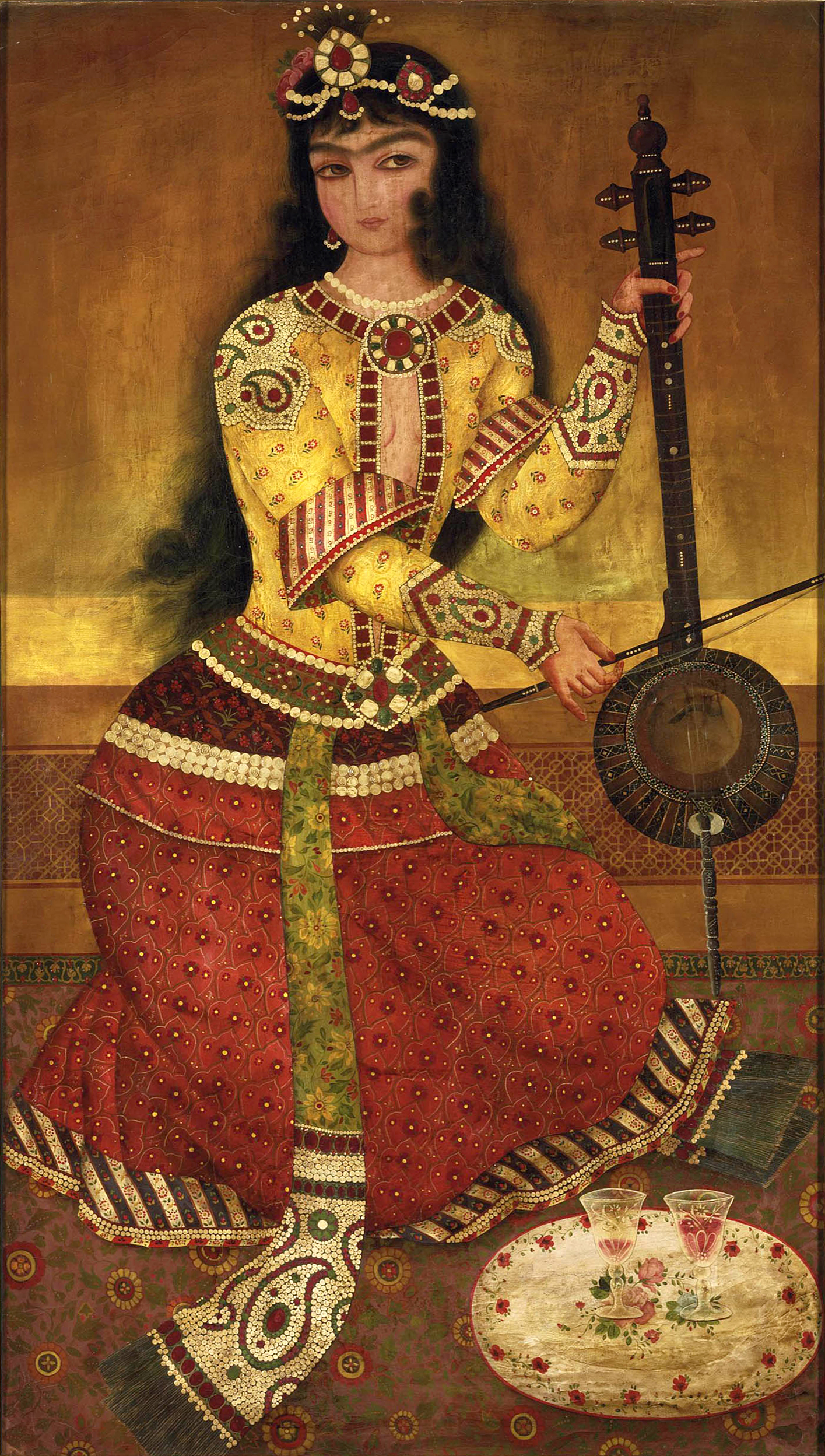
Playing a kamancheh

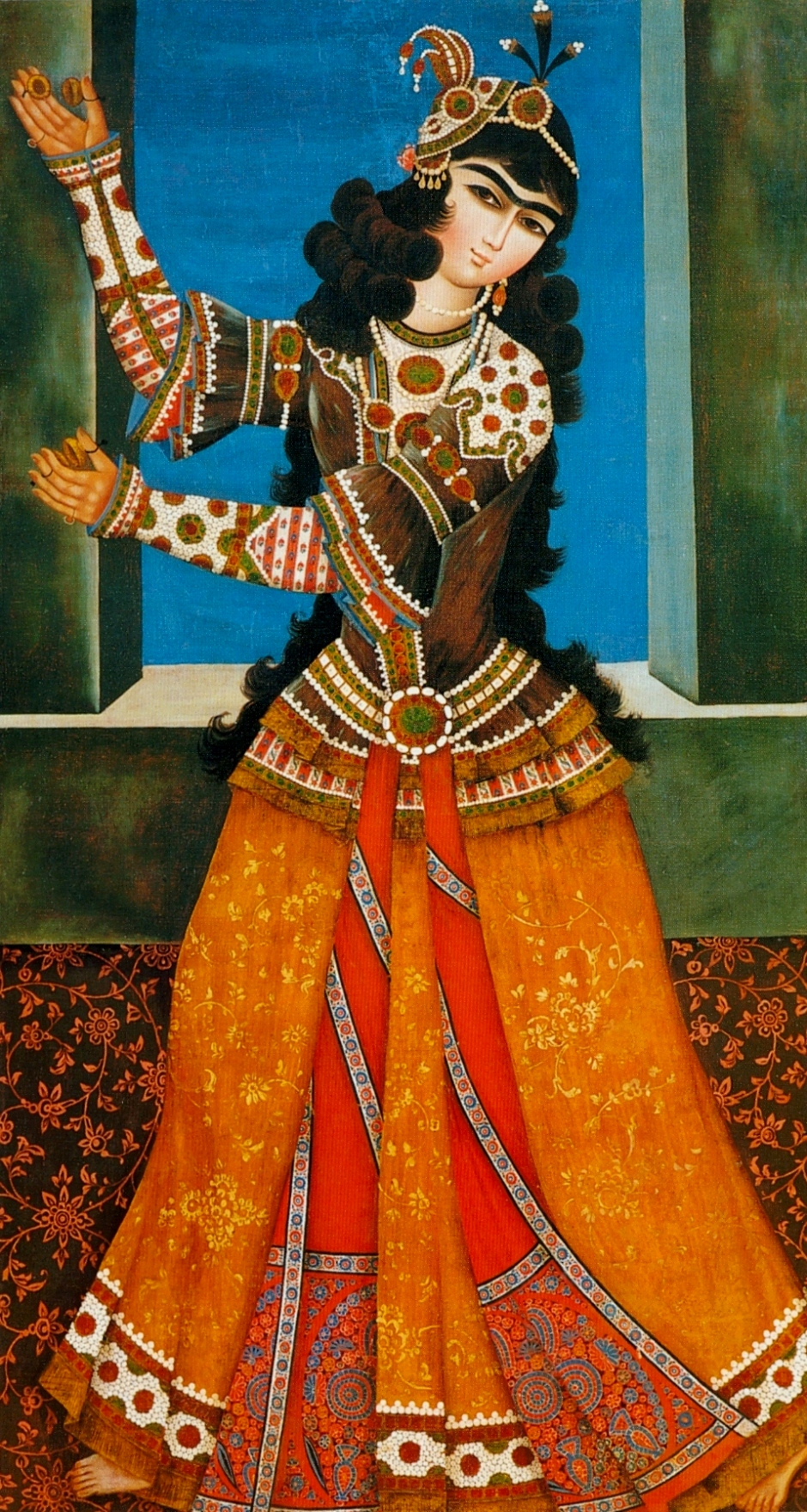
Dancing with castanets or zill

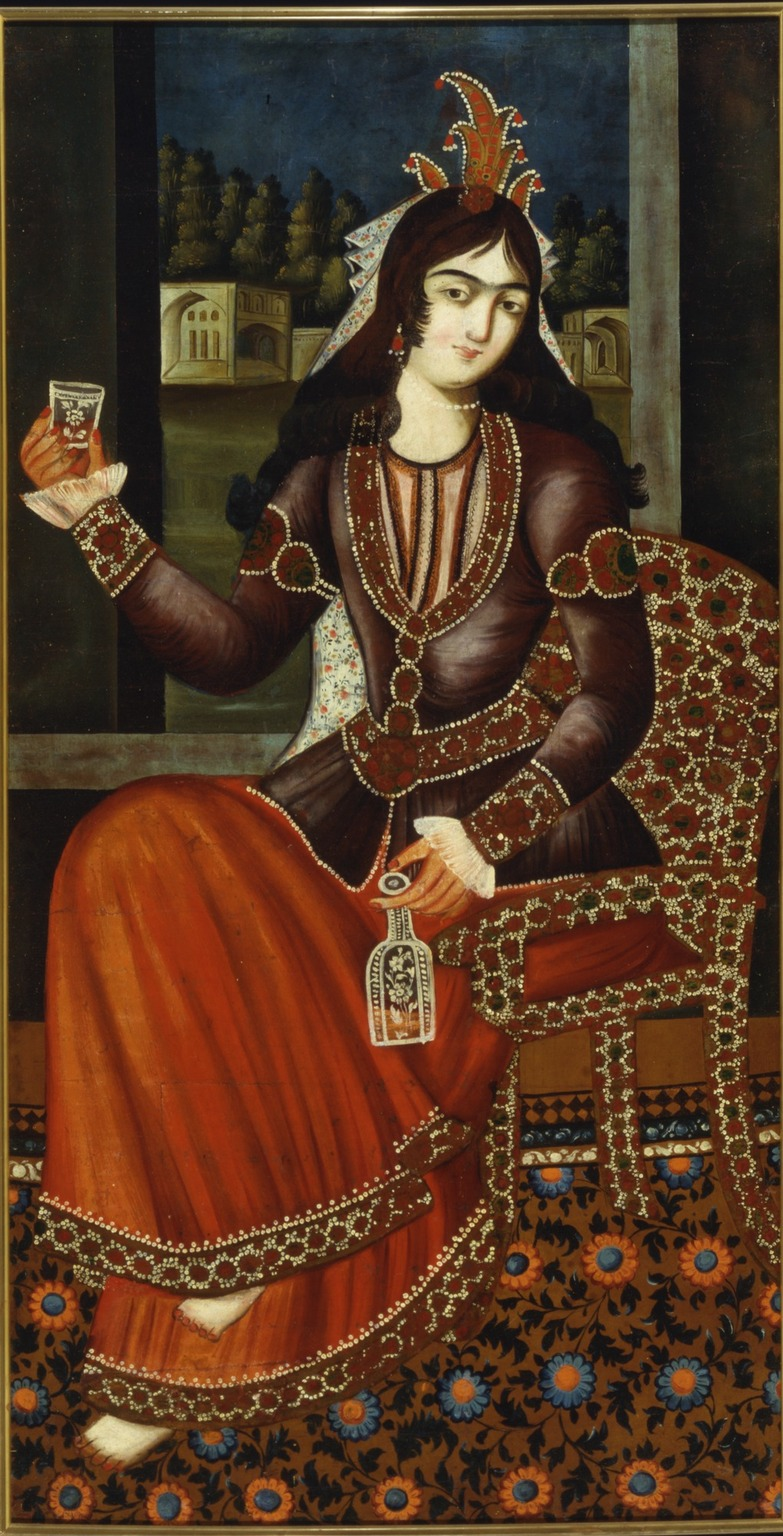
Woman holding a bottle and a glass.

== Lacquerware ==
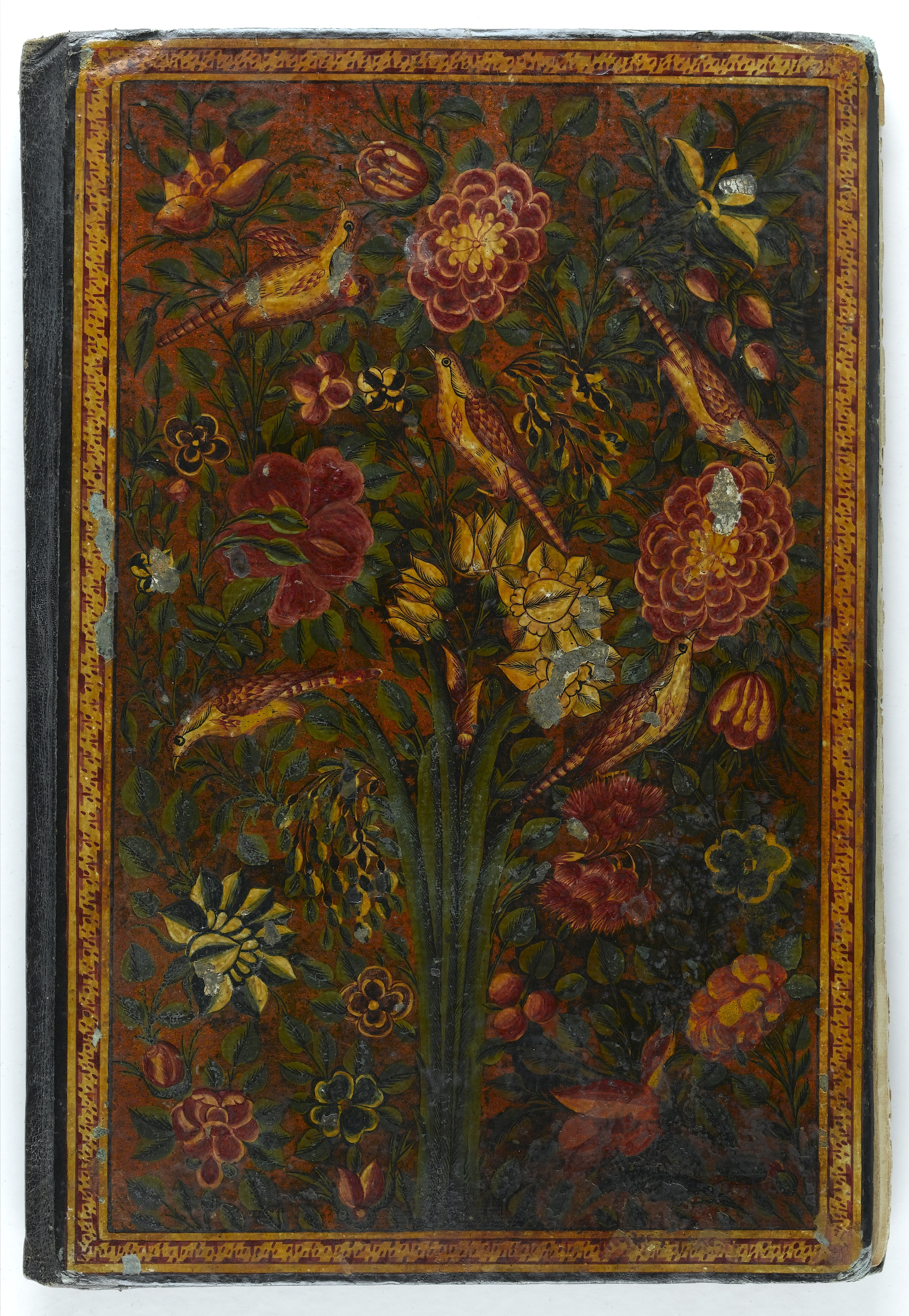
Lacquer book bind with birds and florals.

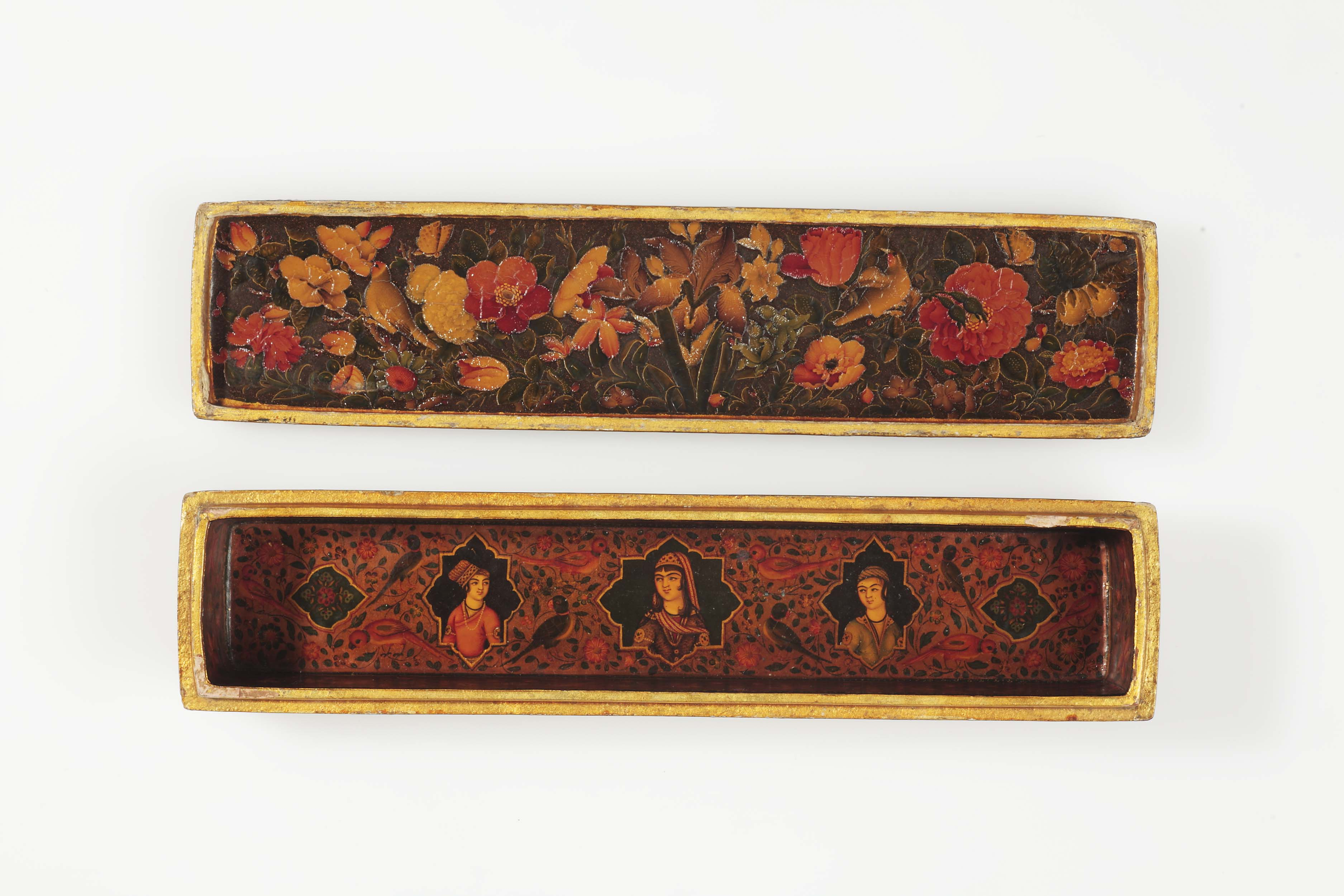
Lacquer pen box with florals and portraits.

Qajar lacquerware is a specific form of decorative lacquer popular during the Qajar era (1789–1925). The era saw a boost in the production of lacquerware objects, especially pen boxes. Lacquer was also used to adorn objects such as mirror cases, manuscript covers, lidded boxes, and other domestic objects, even playing cards. Often, these objects had added metalwork elements such as hinges or embossing. The decoration typical of this art form is characterized by its bright colors, detailed ornamentation, and blend of Persian and European motifs and themes.

Unlike East Asian lacquerware, which are made from tree resin, Qajar lacquerware is shellac-based. Shellac comes from the lac insect and was refined to be applied in layers to wood, paper mache, or other materials. Once sanded down, the top layer was decorated with the artwork that would cover the lacquer. The painted surface was then protected by a layer of transparent lacquer varnish.

The paintings beneath the layer of lacquer (shellac) feature a wide range of imagery including portraiture, calligraphy, foliage, animals, and romantic scenes. Some scenes depicted the idyllic life of the ruling class, including representations of members of the royal family and Qajar court enjoying feasts in lush gardens surrounded by beautiful women, servants, and the trappings of luxury. The most commonly found motif of the Qajar era were birds among flowers on a solid-colored background. Such floral imagery was popular in various arts and thus reflects the tastes of the time, but it also reflected the Qajars' interest in European arts. Moreover, trade with European countries increased at this time and, as a result, some artists began to "westernize" their art, blending both Persian and European styles.

Several prominent artists made names for themselves by either producing lacquerware, or developing their own styles. Some of the more notable artists were Mohammed Ali Ashraf, Mohammad Sadiq, Mohammed Baqir, and Abu Talib. Two different schools of art emerged during this period; the Abu Talib style, also known as the Machine Turning style, and the Imami School. The Machine Turning style is expressed in linear abstract designs while the Imami School is characterized by highly detailed florals.

== Calligraphy ==
Calligraphy is and has been the definitive Persian art form. There exists a prohibition in Islam against the depiction of sentient beings, similar to the Jewish rule against graven images, and as such, calligraphy and its associated art forms became a very important part of Islamic expression. Upon the introduction of the Arabic script to Iran, the people therein set themselves to making it their own.

=== The Shāhanshāhnāmeh ===
During the reign of Fath Ali Shah Qajar, a work of literature and art was commissioned that was intended to rival the Shāhnāmeh (شاهنامه, lit. "Book of Kings") which was written by Ferdowsi in the year 1000. This book was called the Shāhanshāhnāmeh (شاهنشاهنامه, lit. "Book of the King of Kings"). The Shahnameh chronicles the quasi-mythical founding of the Persian Empire and the heroes and villains who punctuated its inception. An exemplar of the Sahanshahnameh are now situated in the National Library of Austria.

== Textile arts ==
The sartorial inclinations of the Qajar era were not so very different from those of earlier periods until the latter half of the era. As is evidenced by the early portraiture of Fath Ali Shah Qajar and Mohammad Shah Qajar, the traditional styles of dress in Iran were preserved, but as Western influences became more and more prevalent, the royal portraits began to depict the Shah in a more Western, military style garb (such as the portrait of Naser ad-Din Shah Qajar above). This is not to say, however, that the traditional textile arts of Iran had fallen into disuse. While the Shah wished to appear advanced and western to European monarchs and diplomats, it was still his duty to exude the pride and ancient glory of the Persian Empire, so court dress retained very strong elements of traditional dress.

== Architecture ==
Architecture of the Qajar era is marked by a deliberate revival of pre-Islamic Persian motifs from Achaemenid (550–330 BCE) and Sasanian (224–651 CE) architectural styles, alongside an eclectic adoption of Western styles such as Neoclassical, Neo-Baroque and Neo-Byzantine.

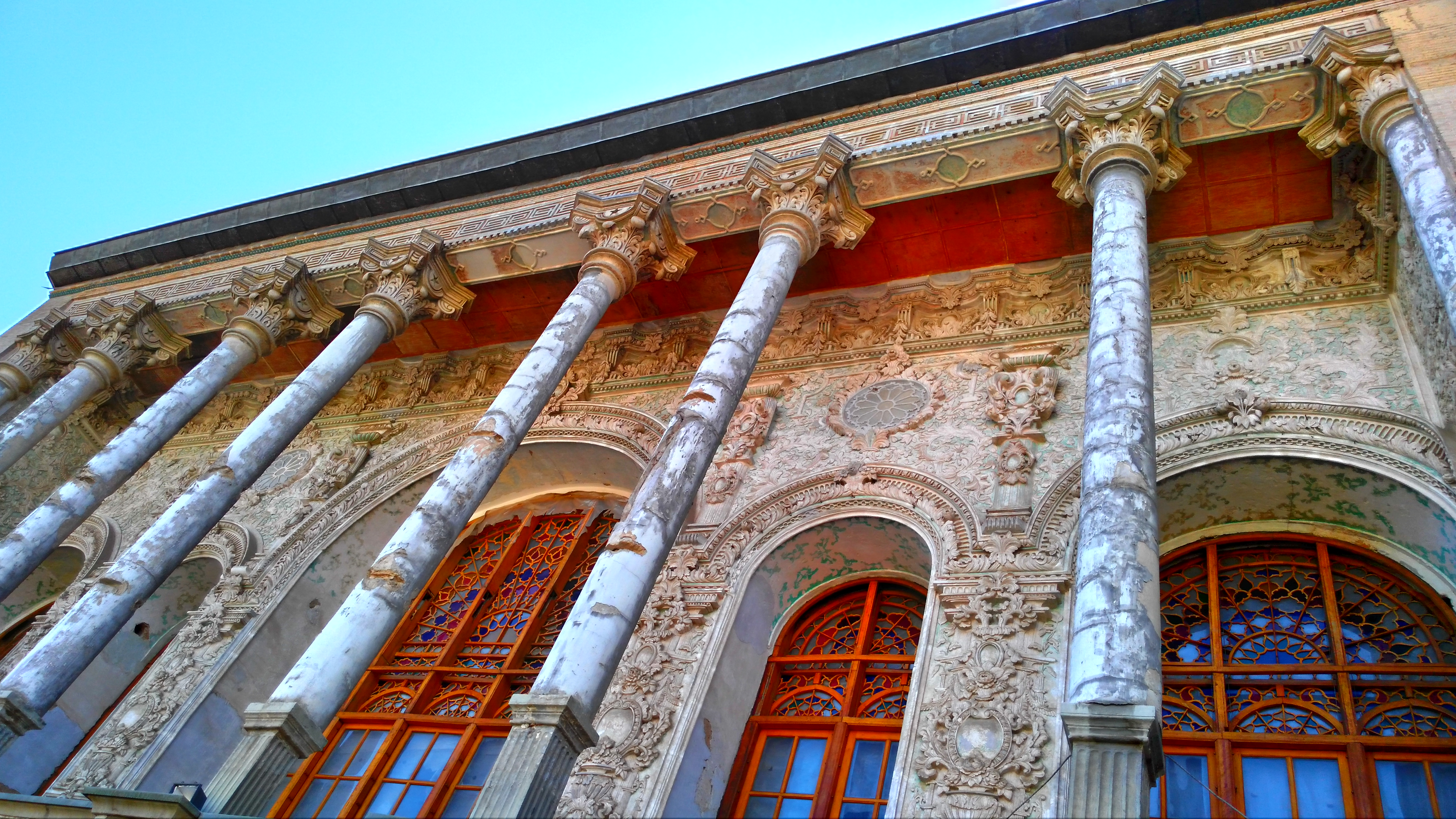
A facade of the Masoudieh Mansion Complex in Tehran, completed in 1878

Examples of Qajar-era architecture and landscape design Include:

- Constitution House, in Tabriz
- Nasir-ol-Molk Mosque, in Shiraz
- Golestan Palace Complex, in Tehran
- The Shams-ol-Emareh Palace (1860s) – first iron (steel) building in the city
- The Niavaran Palace Complex, in Tehran
- The Sahebgharaniyeh Palace
- The Ahmad Shahi pavilion
- Sa'dabad Palace Complex, in Tehran
- The Green Palace
- Eram Garden (Bāgh-e Eram) Persian gardens, in Shiraz
- Shazdeh Garden (1890s), in Kerman
- Abbas Mirza Mosque, in Yerevan (largely destroyed)
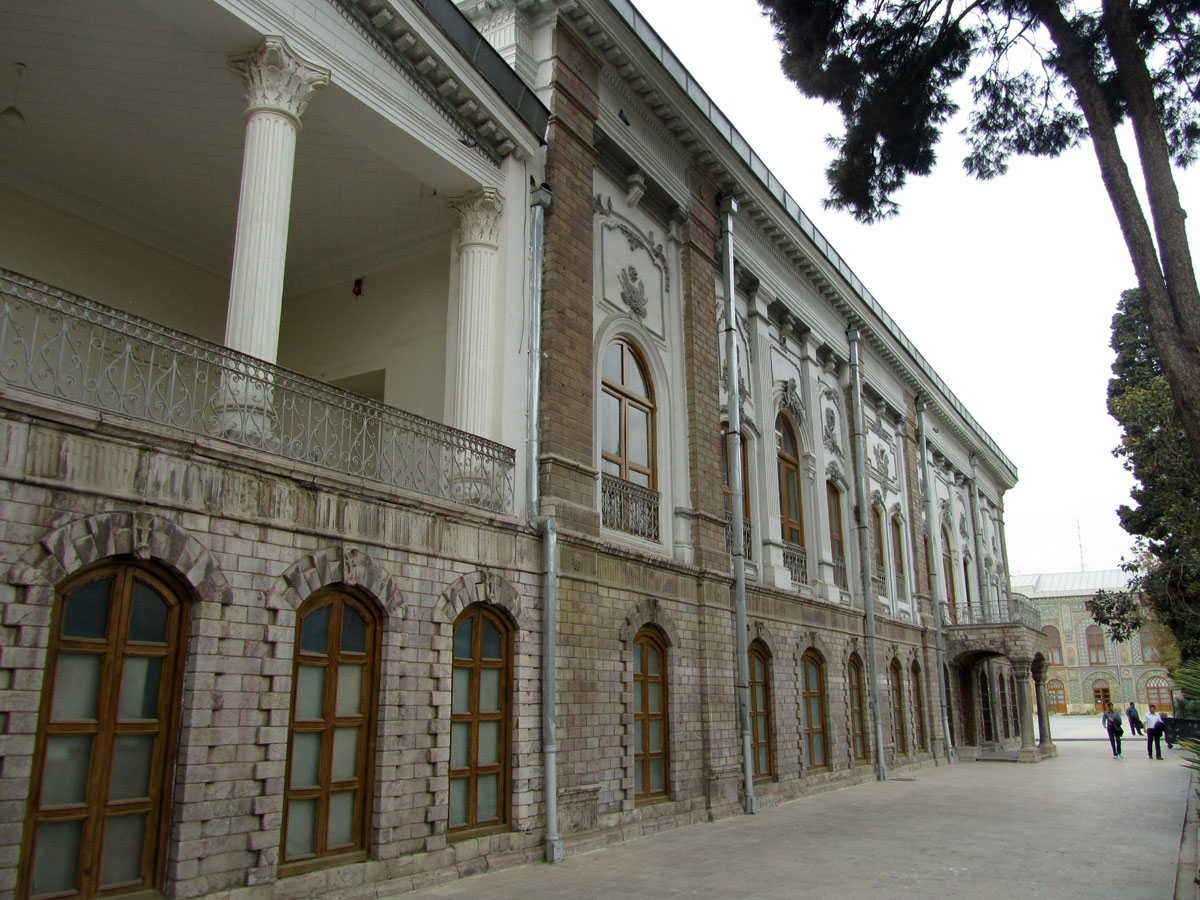
Museum of Anthropology Tehran in Abyaz palace, Golestan Palace

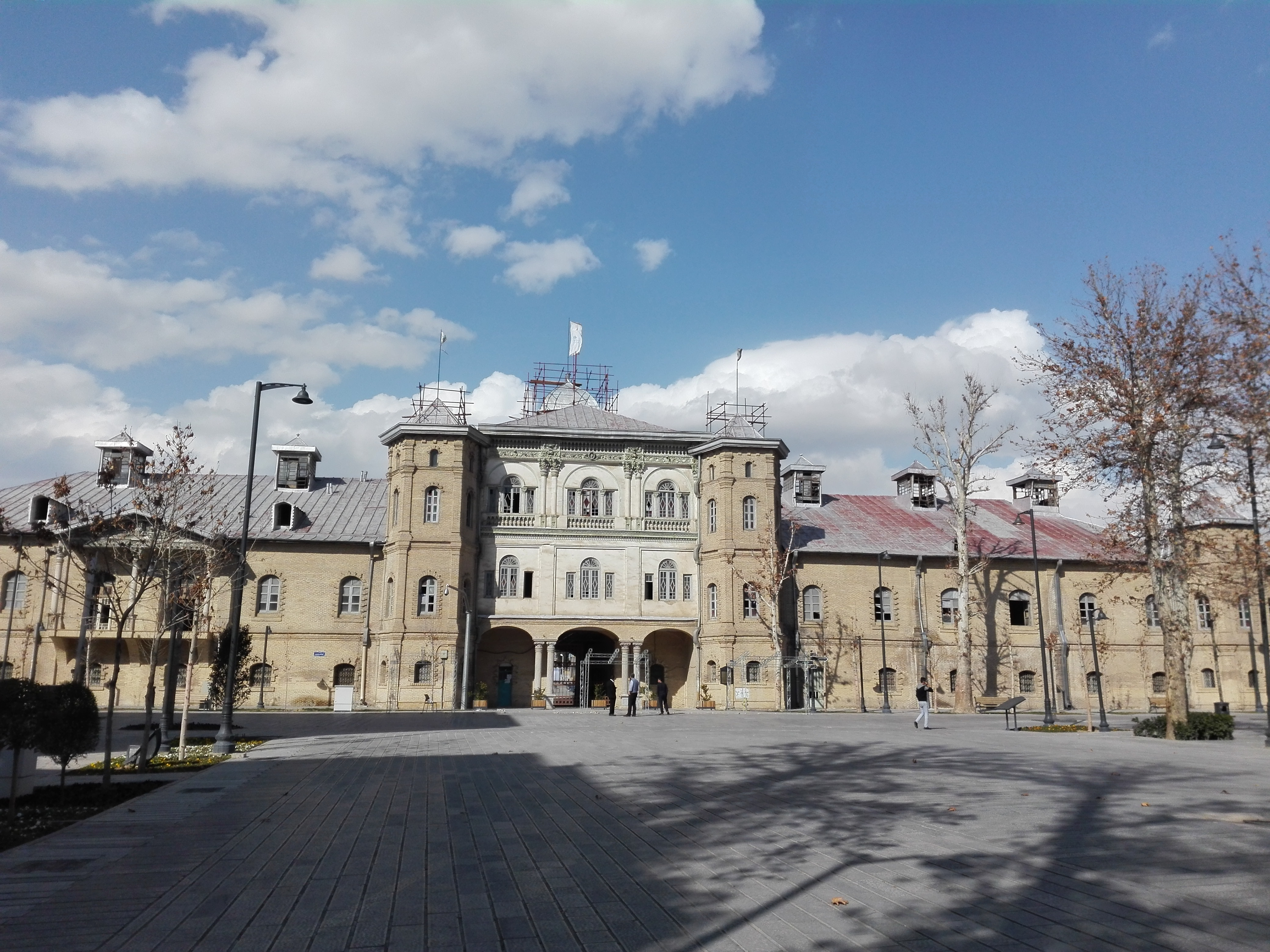
Qazaq Khaneh (1873) in the National Garden, Tehran

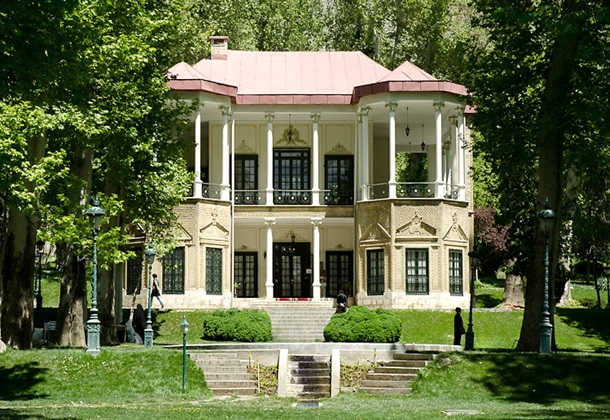
Ahmad Shahi Pavilion (1910s)

== Photography ==
Many new technologies were adopted under the rule of Naser al-Din Shah (ruled 1848 to 1896). Photography became popular in Iran during the late Qajar era and was embraced enthusiastically by Naser al-Din Shah who famously photographed many of the women of the Qajar court. During his rule, the interaction between photography and painting grew, both in terms of style and composition.

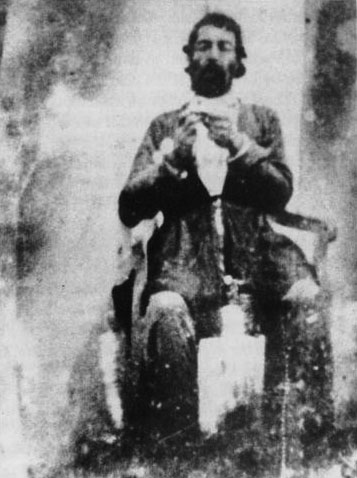
Prince Malek Qasem Mirza's daguerreotype self-portrait. He is seen with a watch in his hand to measure the exposure time.

In the 1840s daguerreotype were introduced to Iran and paved the way for more photographic instruments to be introduced to Iran. Unlike the Ottoman Empire, where photography was seen as sinful, in Iran it was accepted and largely used. The only surviving daguerreotype photograph is a self-portrait by Prince Malek Qasem Mirza, Naser al-din Shah's uncle.

In 1889, the first essay on photography in Iran entitled Aksiyeh Hashariyeh was written by Mohammad ibn-Ali Meshkat al-Molk.

=== Women in Iranian photography ===
The first photographer to depict women in photos presumably was Naser al-Din Shah. The shah's mother, Malek Jahan Khanum, is the first Iranian woman to be depicted. Starting in 1858, shah started taking photographs of his harem's residents. Art historian Pamela Karimi also notes that some women from shah's harem were depicted unveiled and "in erotic poses". In addition to photographing himself, he taught and encouraged his servants to acquire this skill. While cultural and religious restrictions limited women from being depicted in photos, the shah ignored these limitations. Likewise, with the spread of photography as a profession, female rather than male foreign photographers had easier access to photograph Iranian women due to gender restrictions.

Jane Dieulafoy (1851–1916), Isabella Lucy Bishop-Bird (1868–1926), and Gertrude Margaret Lowthian Bell (1868–1926) are three western female travelers in Iran during the Qajar era, who were active in photographing both men, women, and social groups. Under the patronage of Naser al-din Shah, Dieulafoy photographed shah's family members, specifically his wife and daughters. Bird, in her turn, was less interested in depicting women, whereas, in her travelogue Journeys in Persian and Kurdistan on Horseback in 1890 , she writes about female daily life and culture in Iran. Gertrude Bell, traveling through Iran in 1911, motivated by archaeological research, was rather concentrated on depicting Iranian landscapes and nature sites, rather than women. However, while photos of men are included in her artistic heritage, there is only one woman among all the photographs done by Bell, and only as a part of a family portrait.

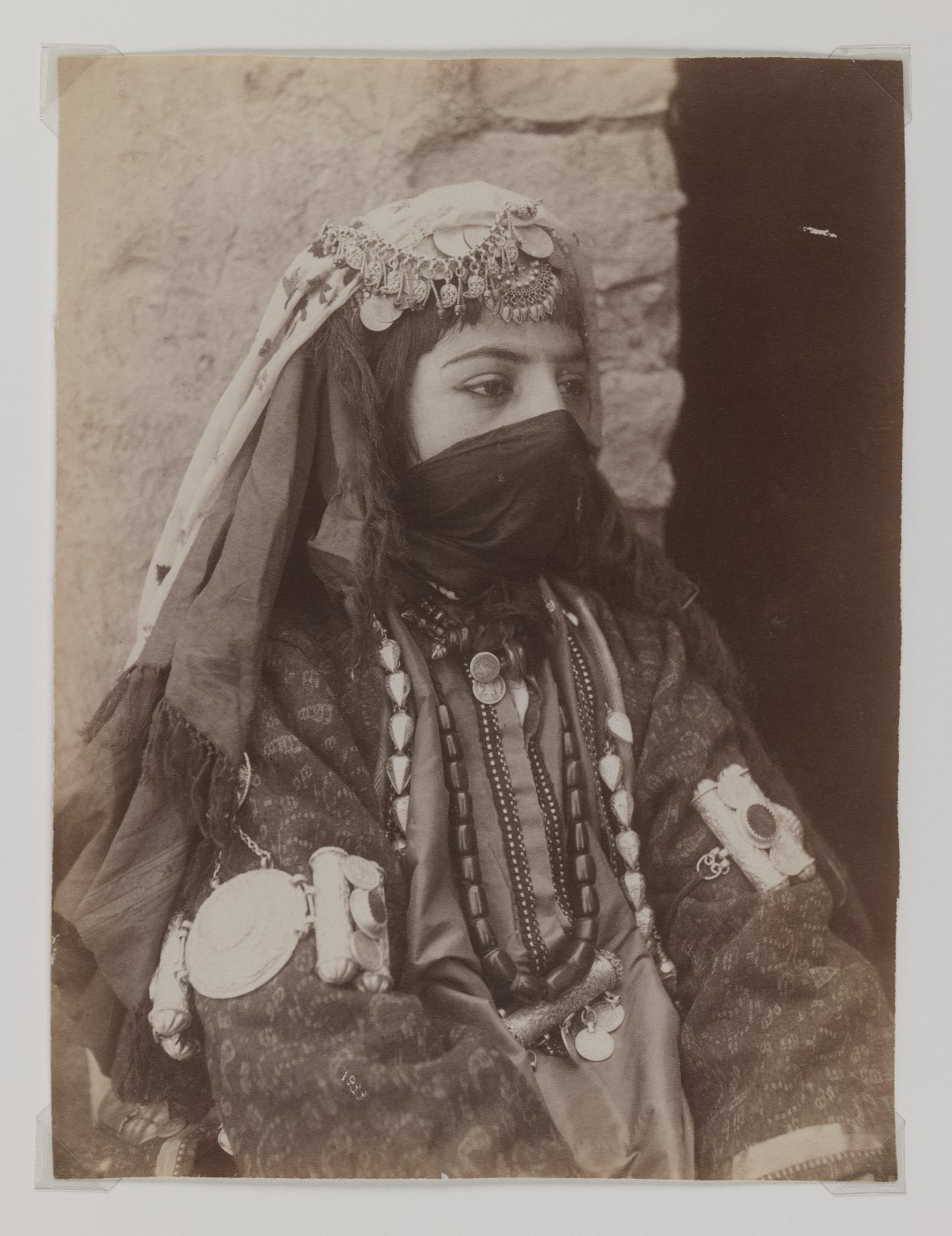
Portrait of a Female Member of the Shah's Family, late 19th-early 20th century.

In 1858, male French photographer Frances Carhlian was appointed by the court to teach photography, propagating the collodion method in the state. Carhlian is the first male foreign photographer to depict Iranian women. As for the Iranian photographers except for shah, only members of nobility had an opportunity to develop in photography, since such a hobby required high expenses, inaccessible to all layers of society. Dust Mohammed Khan Mo'ayyer-ol-Mamalek (1856–1912), husband of one of the shah's daughters, together with his brother Mirza, established a photo studio in their house. Possessing fully equipped cameras, they soon became professional photographers, being the first among noblemen, to photograph women. With the spread of female photography, the cultural and religious taboo was gradually declining. Coupled with innovations introduced by western-educated photographers, both Iranian and foreign, court women started to be photographed more often and with time, in a less modest dress. Whereas previously, they were required to be fully veiled in the photos.

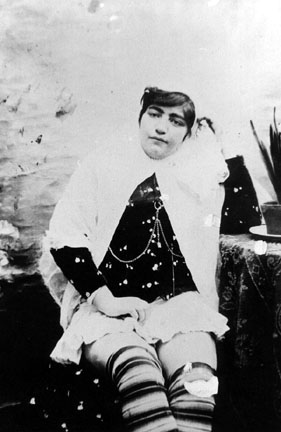
An Iranian woman photographed during the Qajar era

With the increasing mobility of Iranian men at the end of the 19th century (their ability to travel to Europe and get an education), their awareness of the female "presence" in the European societies, coupled with the Constitutional Revolution, helped to significantly change the perception of women in Iranian society. New cultural appropriations changed the depiction of women in the arts as well. For instance, such a genre as family photography emerged, whereas before, only fathers with their children were depicted in photos, excluding mothers. At the end of the 19th and the beginning of the 20th century, women activated to demand more rights. As a rule, education was a privilege of elites. As such educated women with upper-class backgrounds were the ones who started to publish their own newspapers, aiming at combating female illiteracy, and being the mobilizers of women's social movements. With the increase in female opportunities, schools for girls started to be established. And in 1909, Tehran's Naseri Girls' School adopted photography as one of the subjects taught in the school, rising women's interest in accusing the skill professionally.

=== Iranian female photographers ===
As in any other field, women had limited opportunities in developing professionally, rather being tied to the domestic sphere. Moreover, in the majority of cases, history is depicted by men, who tend to bypass female inputs into society. Consequently, information on female Iranian photographers is significantly limited as well. From the only accessible sources, it is assumed that women from upper-class families and wives of photographers had the greatest opportunity to acquire the skill professionally. For example, Iranian princess Ashraf os-Saltaneh was a photographer. As Naomi Rosenblum concluded, after helping the husband in the photo business, a wife herself would frequently continue with it, after her spouse would pass away.

Ozra Khanom, wife of the court photographer Aqa Yusef Akkasbashi, together with her sister Soltan Khanom, worked as a family photographers. Ashraf-os-Saltane, the wife of one of the Naser al-Din Shah's minister and translator, also was active in photography.

== Popular literature ==
Popular literature of the Qajar era is of high historical importance since the era itself reflects a transitional time between tradition and modernity. Moreover, the Qajar era represents a period when printing emerged, enabling the development of new literate genres. It also marked a transition from oral propagation to printed literature as a main medium of story-telling. While printing greatly changed the perspective of story distribution, it was not comparable to 21st-century printing capabilities. Lithography is a printing technic that was used in Qajar times; it was invented at the end of the 18th century but has reached Iran only in the second half of the 19th century.

Eminent scholar and researcher of Iranian folklore Mohammad Ja'far Mahjub contributed to the study of the Qajar literature by outlining and classifying the main topics that were present in the literature of that period. These included:

- imagined stories
- stories with historical background
- stories inclusive of religious motives
- stories about the historical importance of religious actors
- adventure stories
- stories with animal actors
- classical Persian poetry

Many samples of Qajar-era popular literature have been lost or poorly preserved. Comparatively major holdings of Iranian literature heritage are mainly held in Iran, but also Russian, English, German and French libraries; and in personal collections.

=== Female input into Qajar literature ===
A period of Qajar rule was characterized by a move from neoclassic literary tradition inherent of conservative Islamic society to reformist aesthetics of pre-constitutional revolution. It served as a basis for significant changes in the perception of literature, and the role of women in producing it. Mohammad Shah (1834–1848) and Naser al-Din Shah were essential figures in "liberating" female creativity and promoting it. While there is a belief that women didn't contribute to the Iranian culture, in reality, women facilitated reformist ideas in their writings no less than men and were responsible for the establishment of girls' schools in Iran in the late Qajar and early Pahlavi eras.

=== Poetry ===
While female literacy used to be a privilege of elites, many women were enthusiastic admirers and compositors of poetry. Under the patronage of Iranian royalty, female poets were promoted, even though society saw women's writing as a transgressive act. It is also considered that Hajji Gawhar Khanum is the first female poet whose poetry has been published under Qajar rule. Her poetic inputs date back to the reign of Naser al-Dln Shah.

== Gallery ==
Qajar art

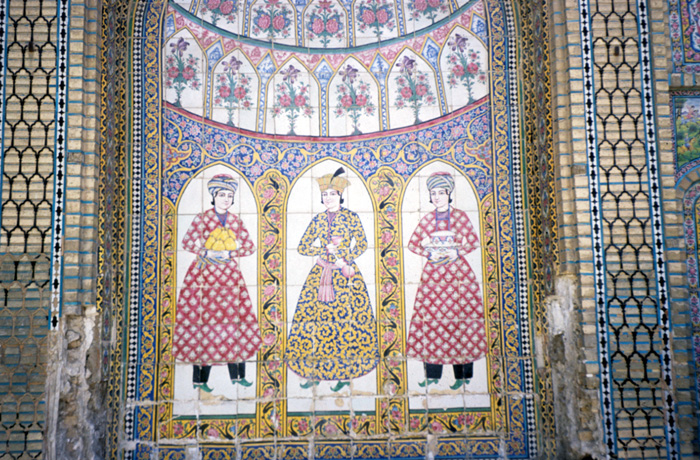
Qajari wall painting at Qavam House—Narenjestan e Qavam

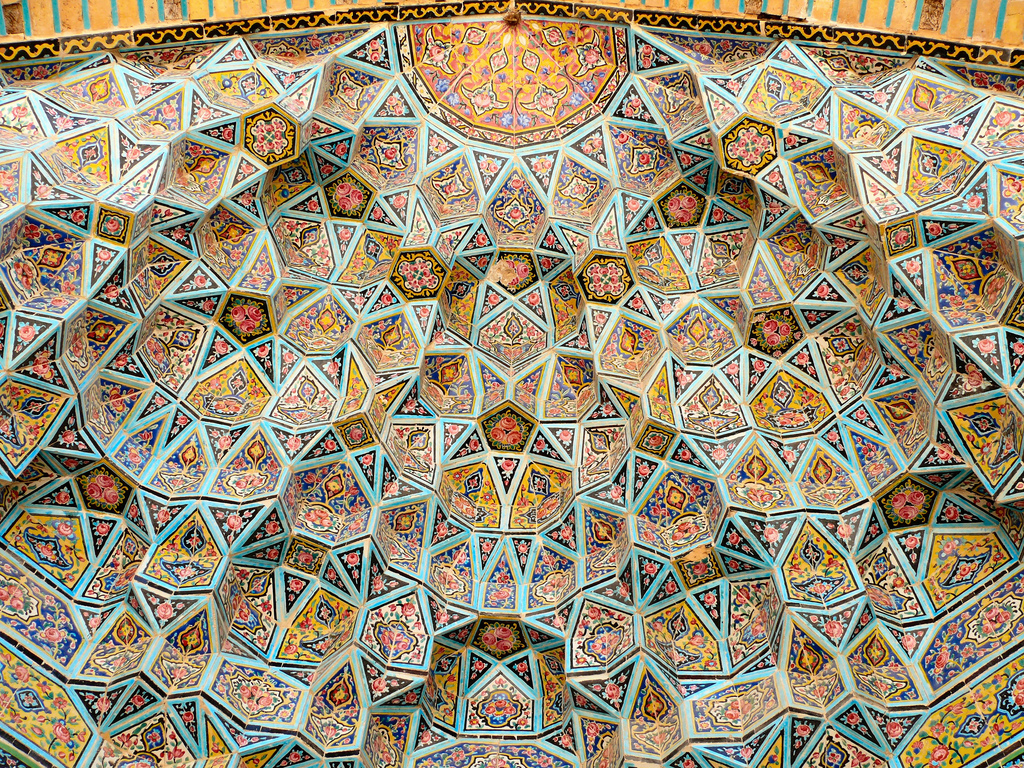
Muqarna at the Nasir-ol-Molk Mosque

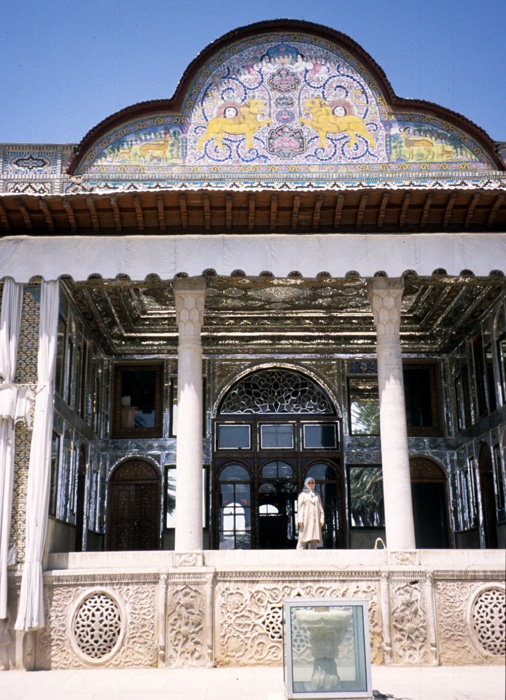
Qavam—Ghavam House, facade and balcony

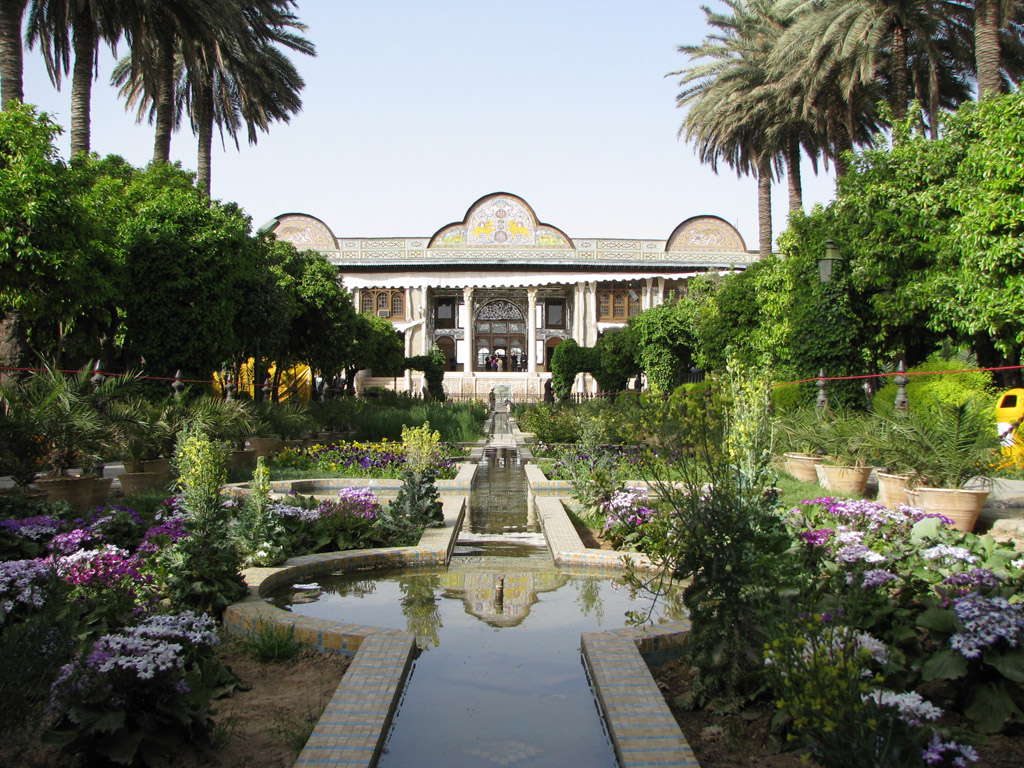
Qavam House

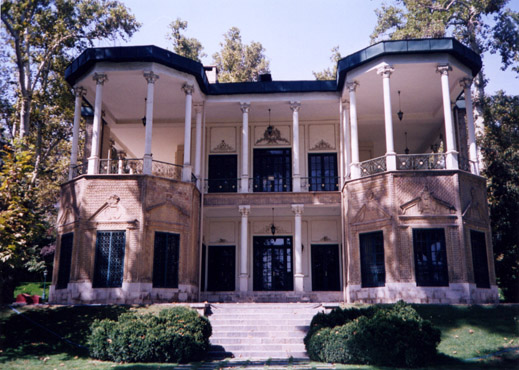
The Ahmad Shahi Pavilion at the Niavaran Palace Complex

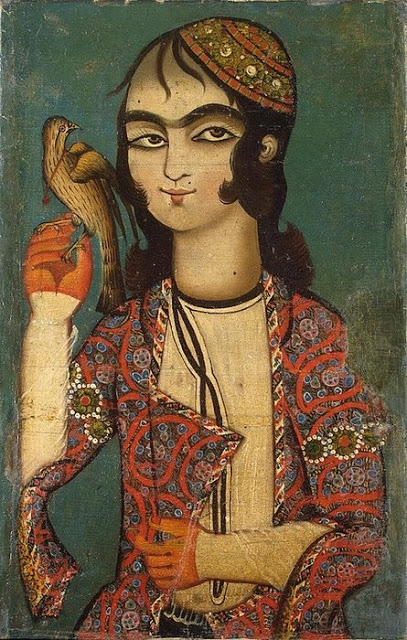
Boy Holding a Falcon

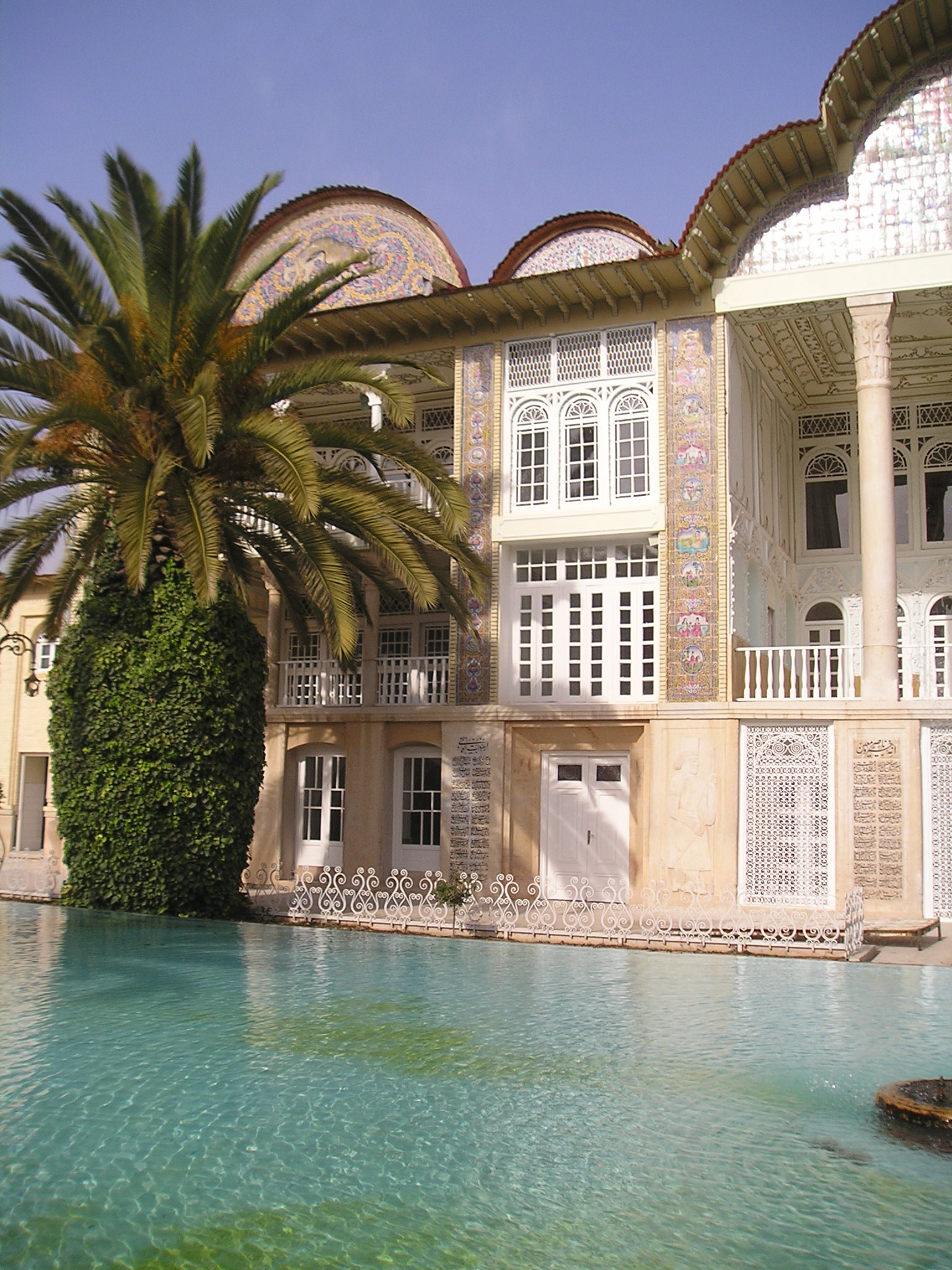
Eram garden

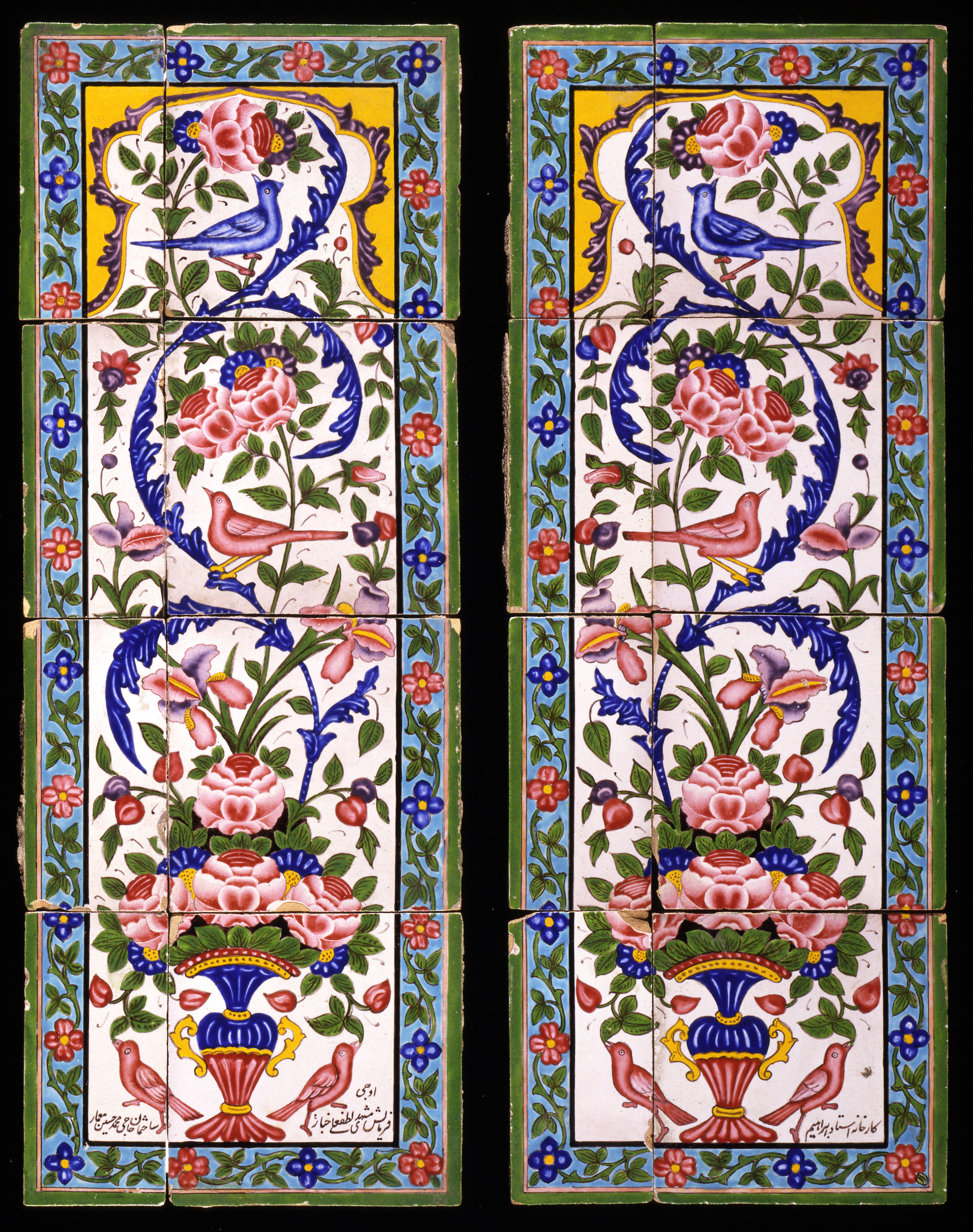
Tiles painted with polychrome glazes over a white glaze

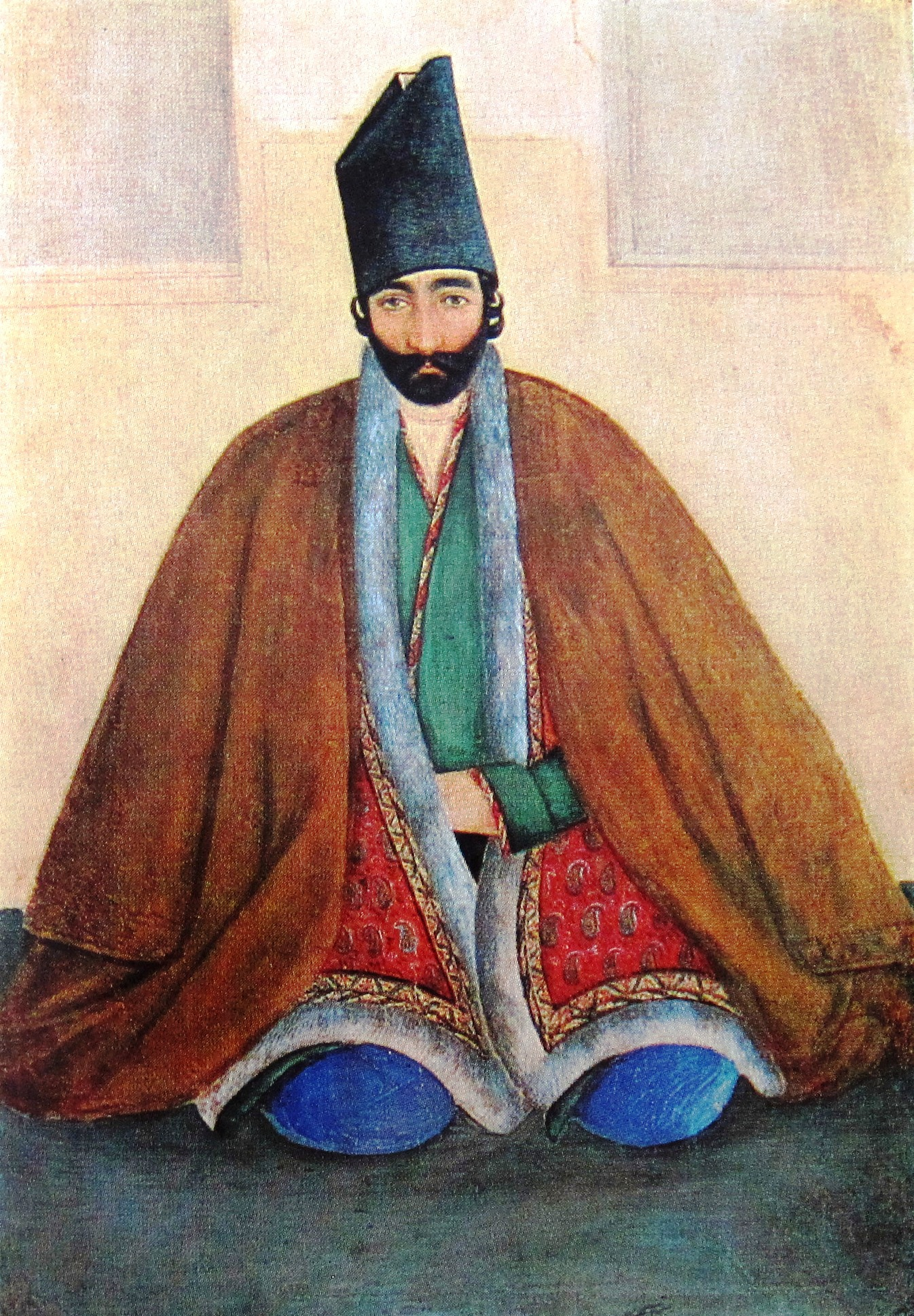
Beglyar Afshar. Portrait of Jamshid ed-Dowleh

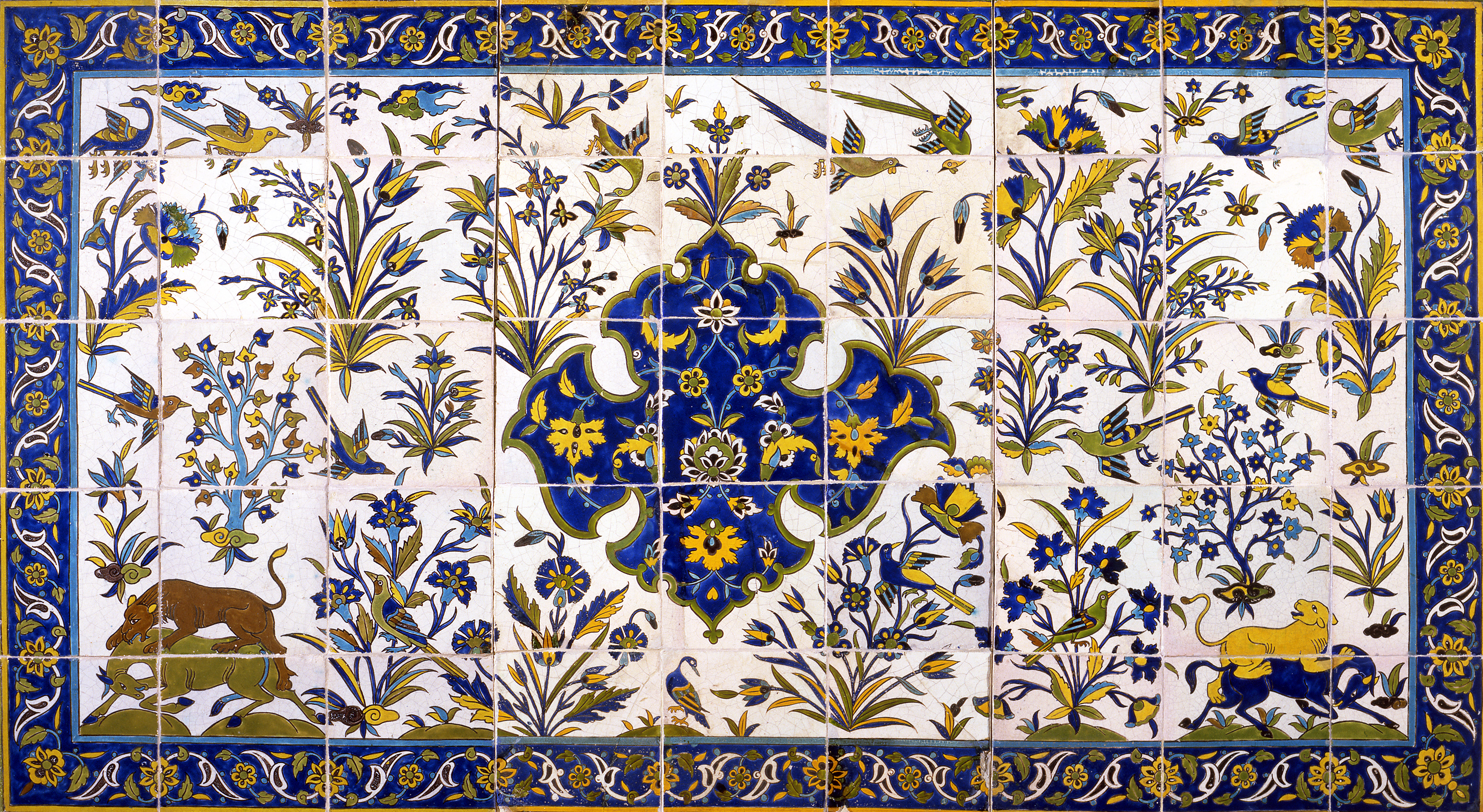
Painted tiles with design of hunting, birds, and flowers

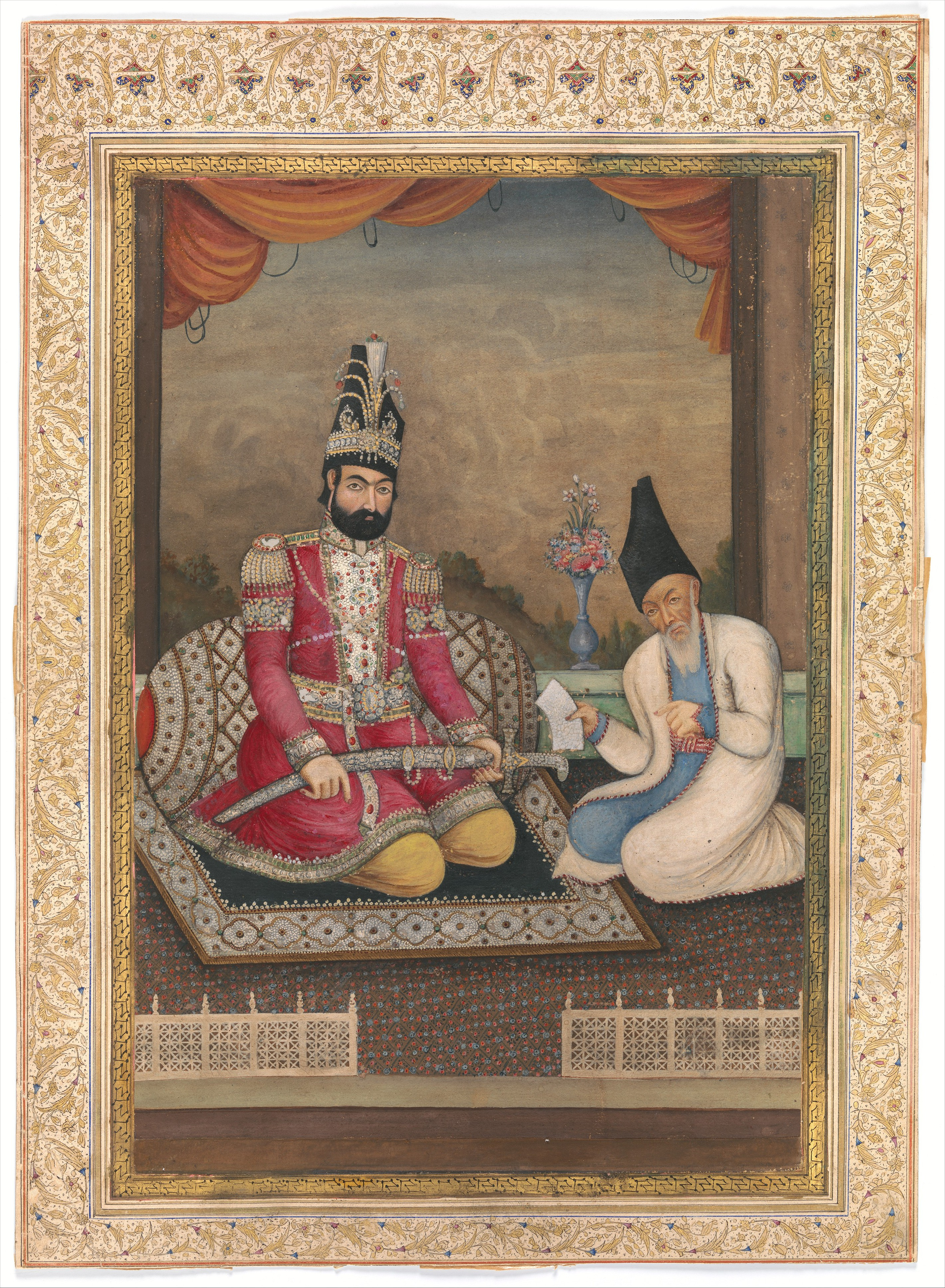
Portrait of Mohammad Shah Qajar and his Vizier Haji Mirza Aqasi, second quarter of the 19th century; ink, opaque watercolor, and gold on paper, collection of the Metropolitan Museum of Art

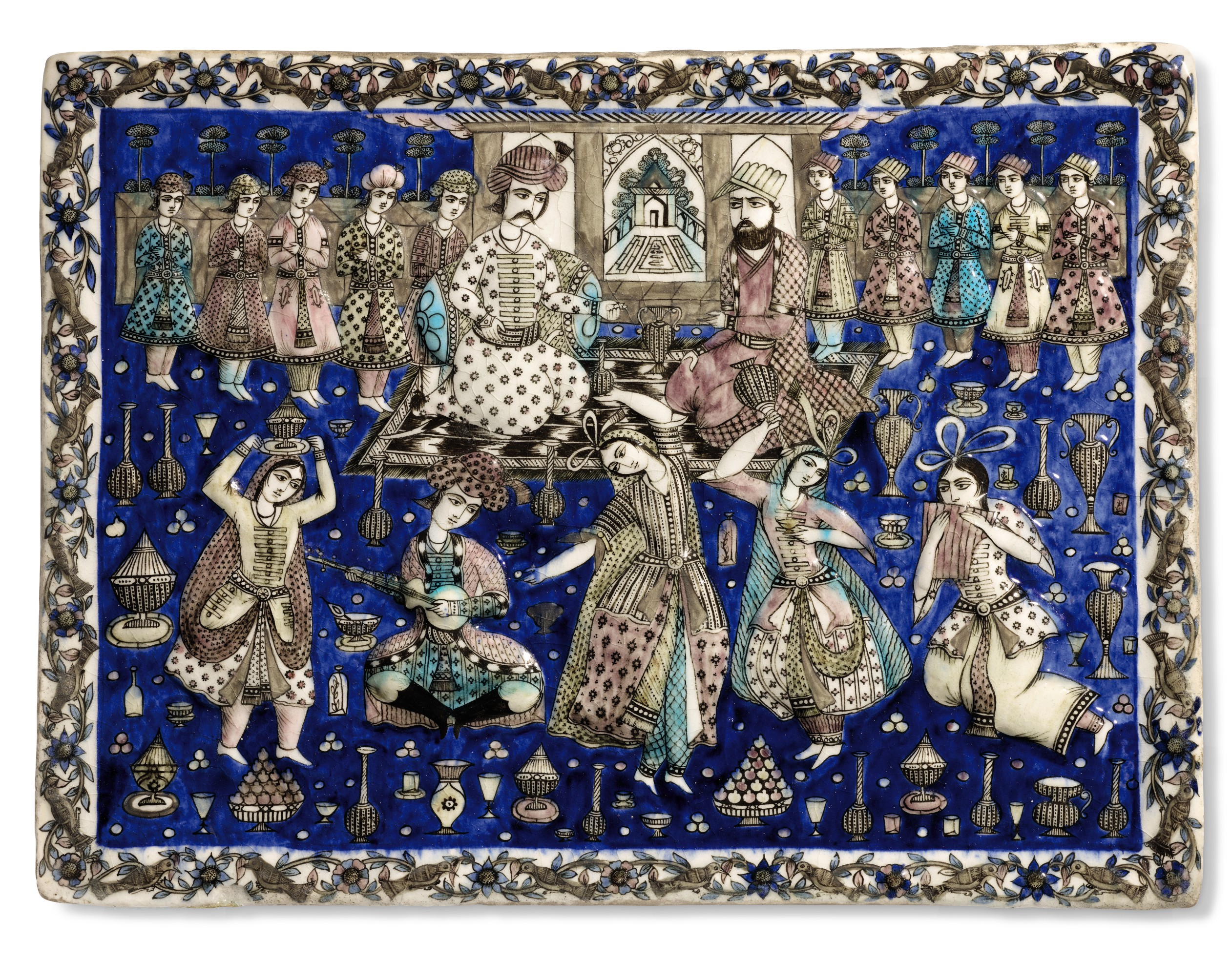
Pottery scene depicting two seated princely figures, surrounded by courtiers, musicians, and dancing girls, 19th-century

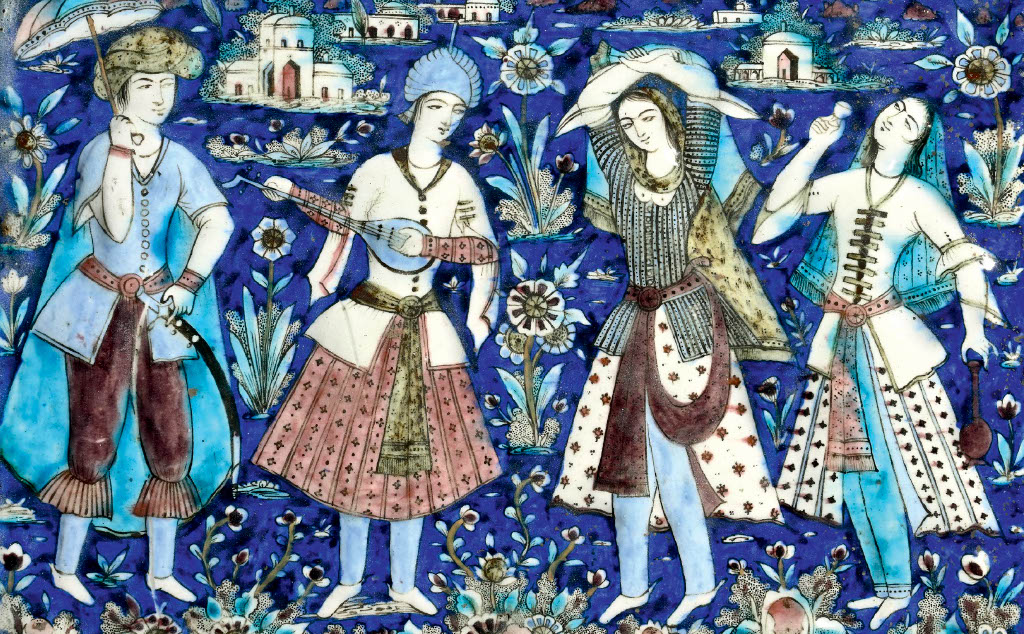
Qajar prince holding a parasol and watching a musician and two dancers, 19th century

== See also ==
- Royal Persian Paintings: The Qajar Epoch 1785–1925
- Malek National Museum and Library
- Ministry of Cultural Heritage, Tourism and Handicrafts
- Shangri La (Doris Duke)
- Esmail Jalayer
