= Central Tehran =

- District
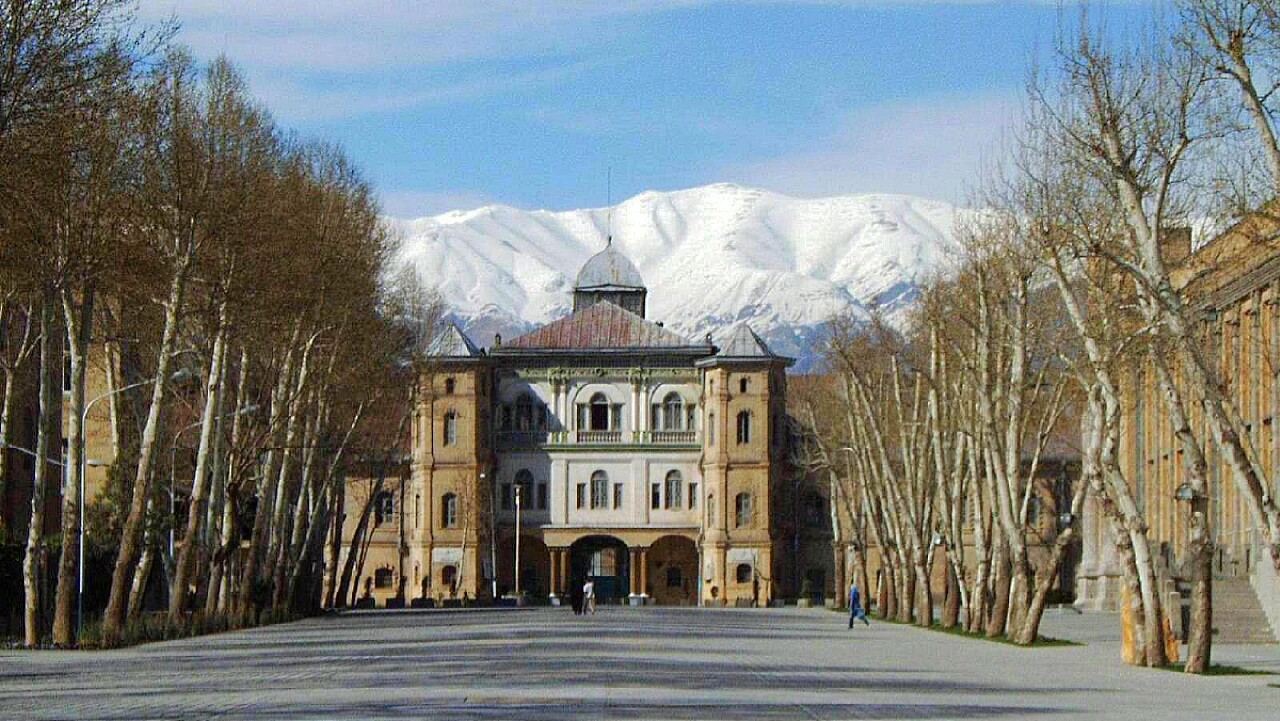
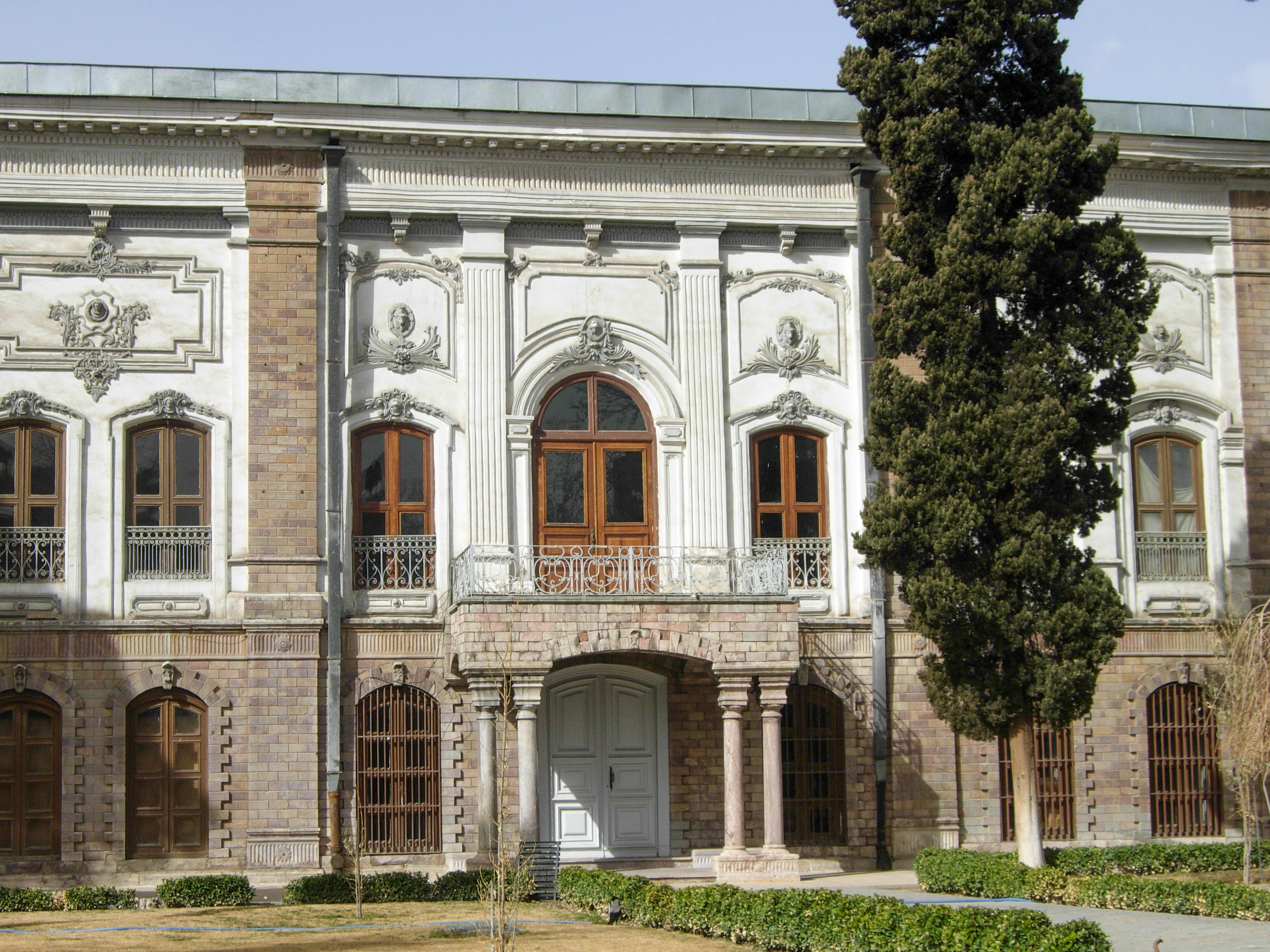
- National Garden Hasanabad Square Golestan Palace Masoudieh Mansion Museum of Anthropology

- Location within Iran
- Coordinates: 35°40′47″N 51°25′13″E
- Country: Iran

District 12 (Persian: منطقه ۱۲, also known as Central Tehran) is one of the 22 municipal districts of Tehran, Iran. Covering an area of approximately 16.91 square kilometers, it is widely regarded as the historical, cultural, and commercial nucleus of the Iranian capital.
