= Qajaresque Neo-Baroque architecture =

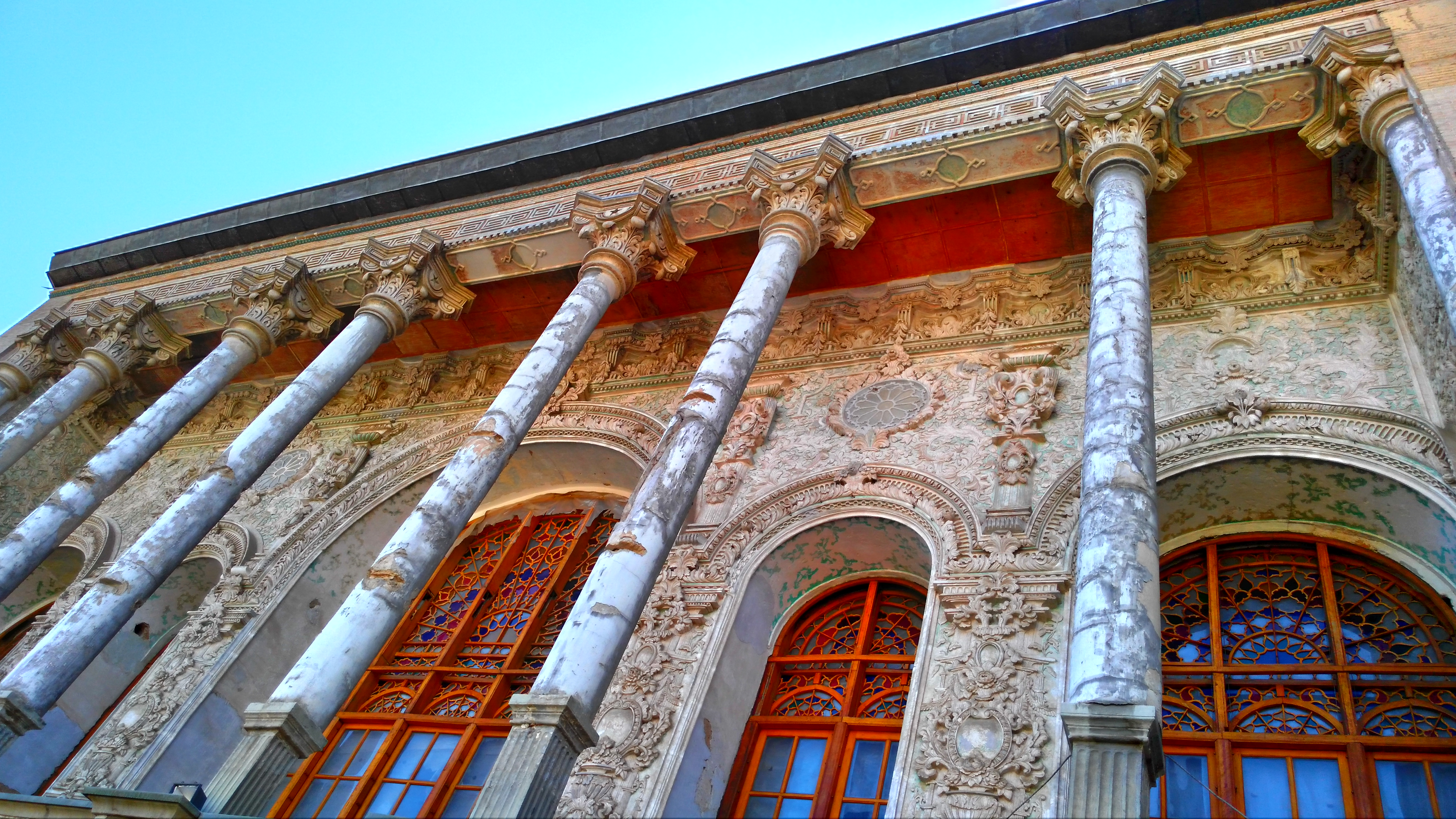
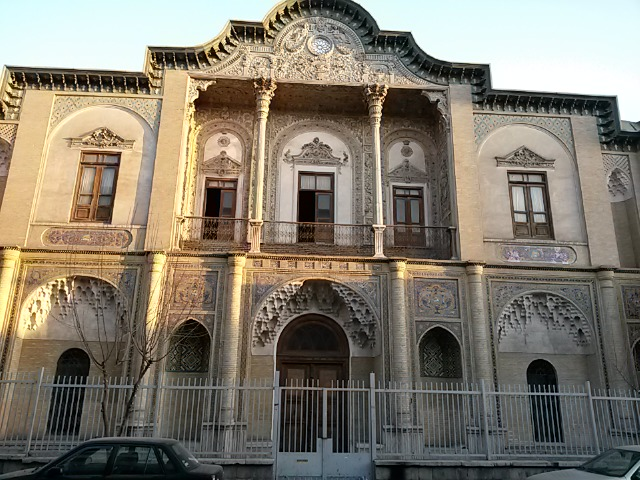
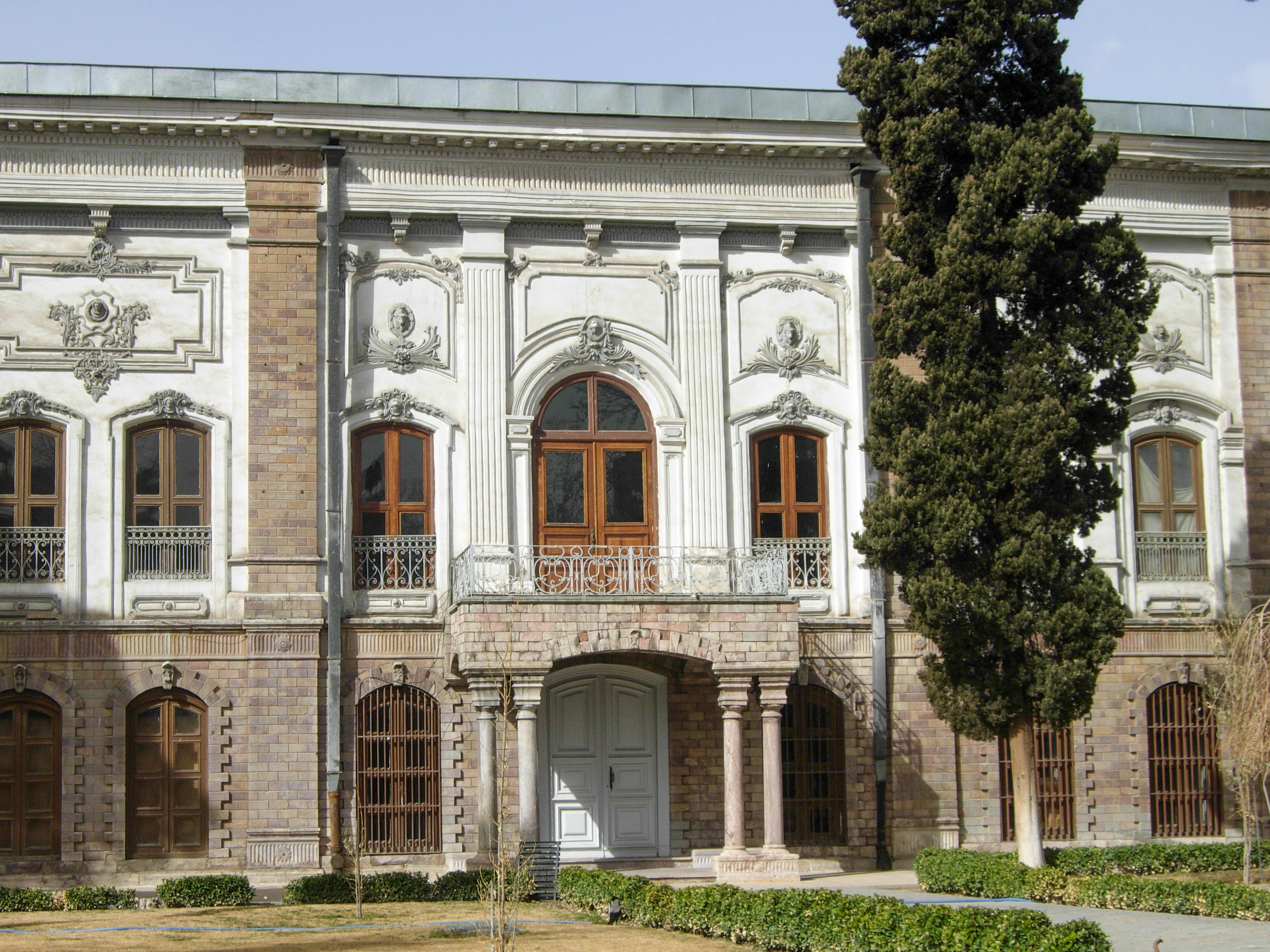
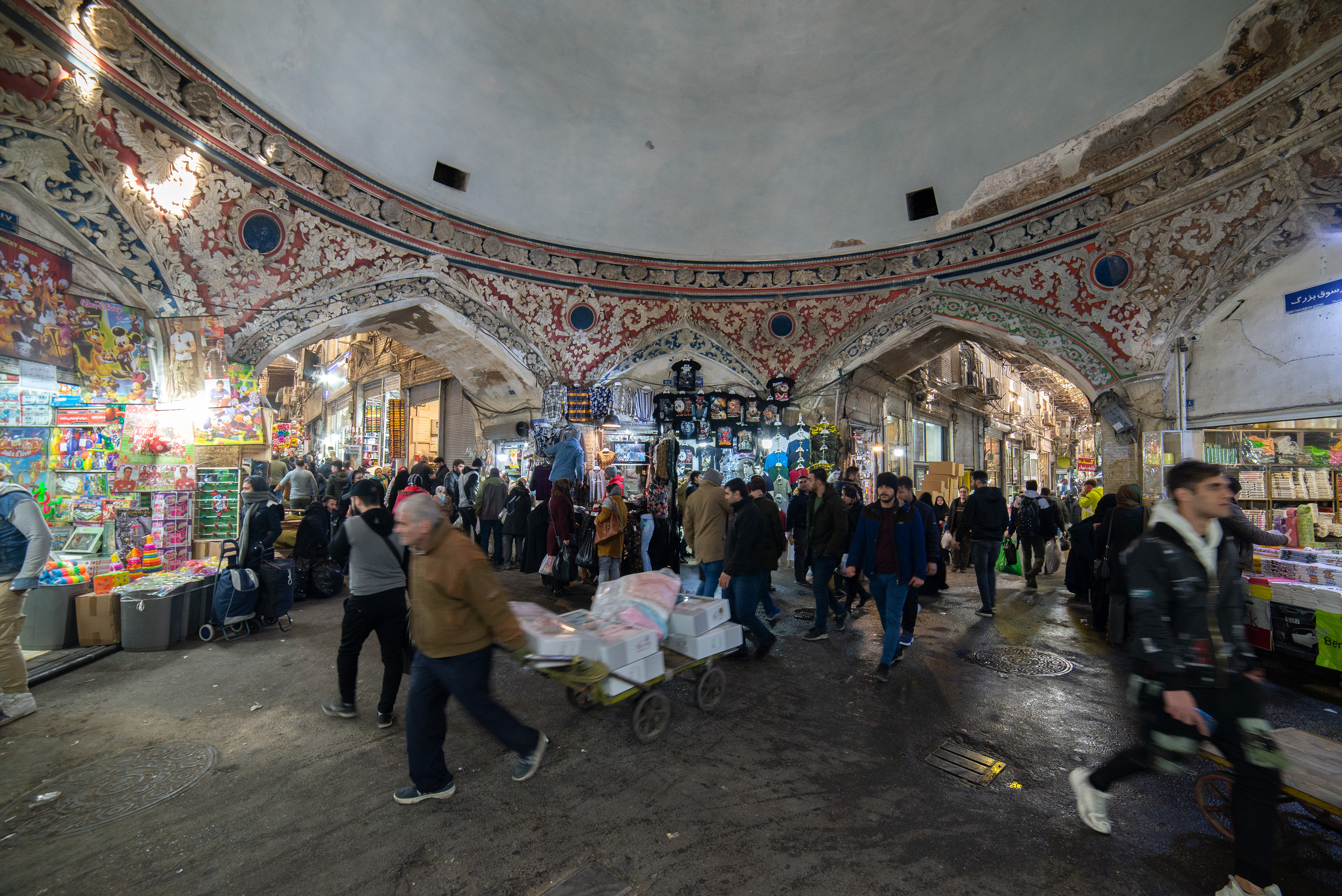
- Top: The Masoudieh Mansion; Centre: The Museum of Anthropology Tehran; Bottom: Grand Bazaar, Tehran
- Years active: mid-19th century
- Location: Iran

Qajaresque Neo-Baroque architecture is an extravagant, eclectic architectural style from 19th-century Persia that blends traditional Persian art with the theatrical luxury of Baroque Revival architecture. The style flourished in Qajar Iran, particularly under the reign of Naser al-Din Shah Qajar and is famous for its extreme use of Stucco.

== Exterior design ==
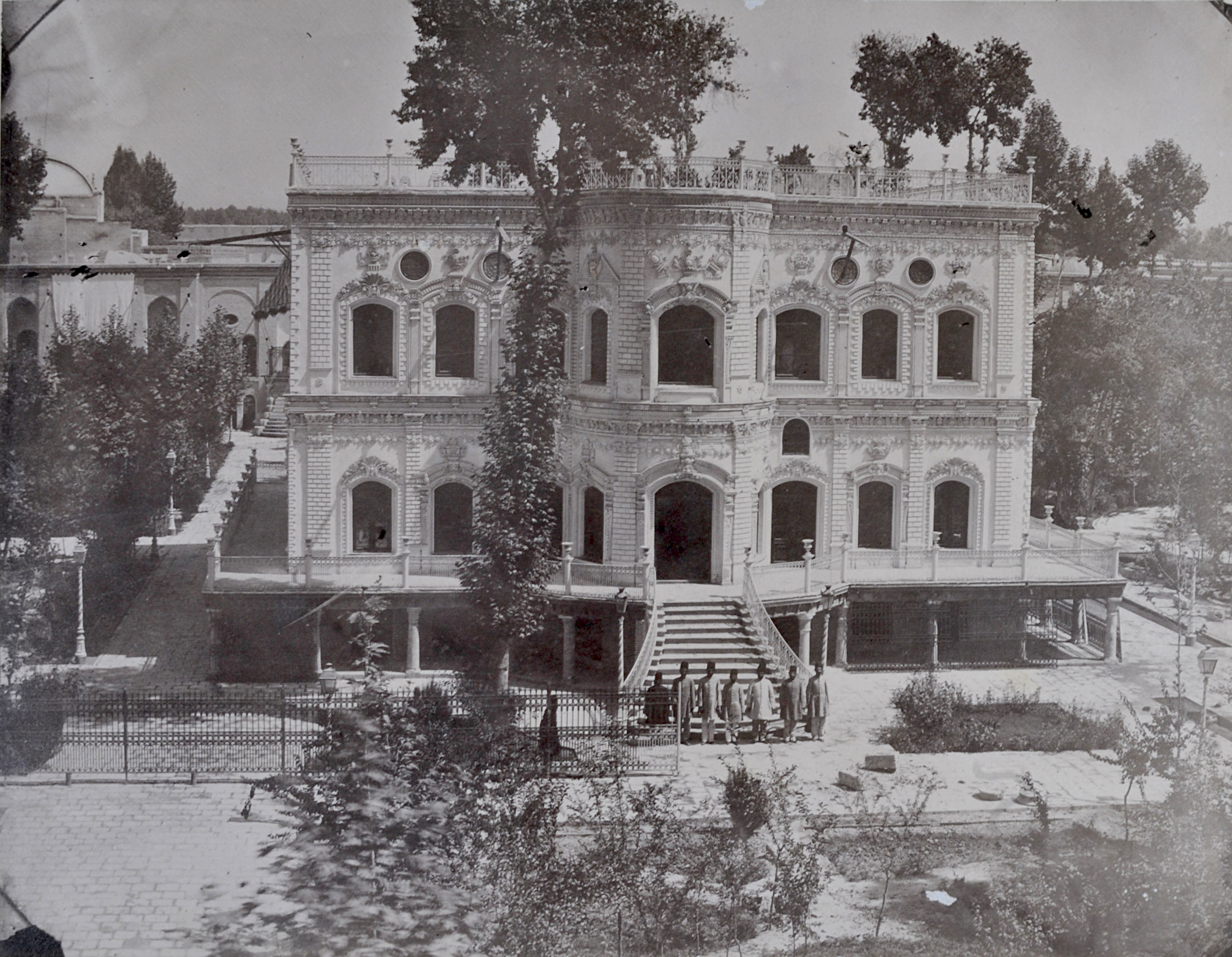
Emarat-e Khabgah, Golestan Palace, erected in 1885.

The historically dominant pointed arch was systemically replaced by the Roman semicircular arch and flat lintel systems across main portals and windows. Windows were no longer treated as simple openings; instead, they became prominent architectural features crowned by highly pronounced triangular, segmental, and broken pediments (santouri).

These elements projected sharply from the exterior brickwork to create a dynamic interplay of depth, light, and physical shadow across the building's face.

== Interior design ==
In the 19th century, the style inverted traditional Iranian residential layouts, shifting from inward-looking private spaces to outward-looking public displays. Interior architects re -engineered centralized reception halls (talar) to center on grand, double-flight imperial staircases. High, flat-framed ceilings replaced historical mud-brick vaults to allow natural light to stream down through massive, street-facing windows and deep exterior balconies.

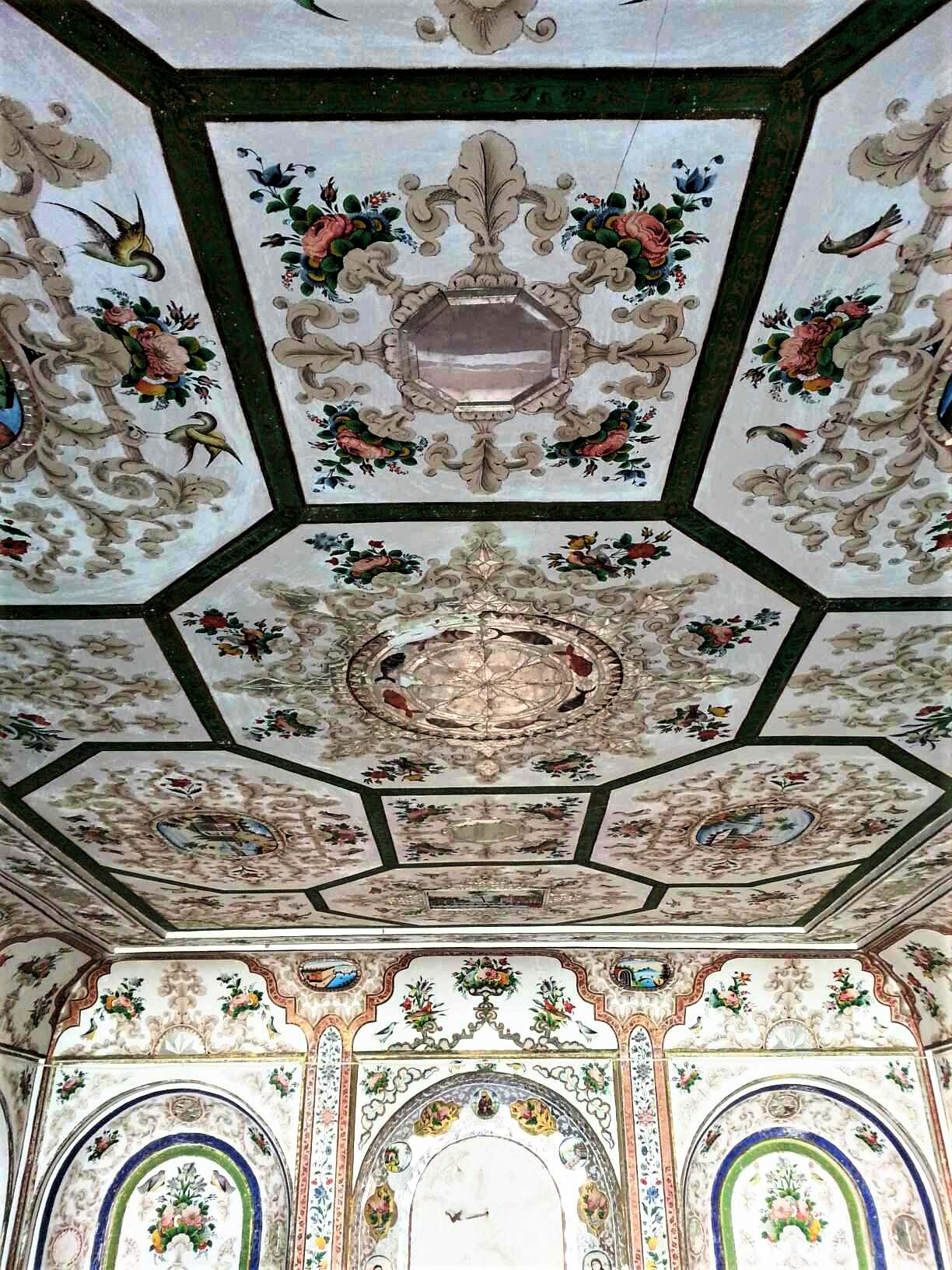
19th-century interior of the Taghavi House in Qehi, Isfahan province

Wall and ceiling decorations experienced a parallel shift from abstract patterns to Western-style figurative realism and oil painting techniques. Interior tilework abandoned Safavid geometric configurations in favor of pictorial paintings depicting realistic European landscapes, flowers, cherubs, and human figures, such as concubines of the Qajar harem, dressed in contemporary Victorian attire.

Ayeneh-kari

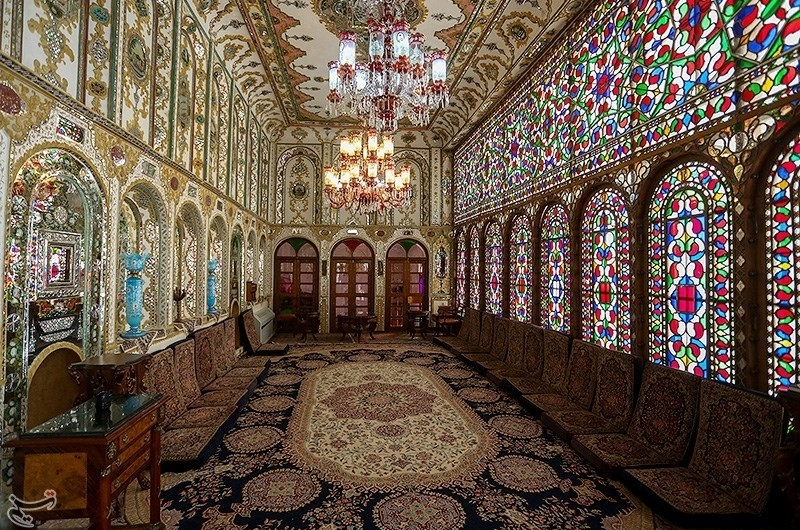
The mirrorwork of the Qajar-era Shah Neshin room in the Mollabashi House, Isfahan.

Traditional Iranian Ayeneh-kari underwent its most radical evolution during this style-period as local artisans merged centuries-old glass cutting techniques with Western architectural forms. Historically, Safavid and early Islamic mirror work relied on microscopic, diamond-cut geometric shapes arranged in intricate mathematical patterns to create a soft, glittering light distribution.

However, inspired by the grand, continuous mirror halls seen by Naser al-Din Shah Qajar during his European tours, late 19th-century master craftsmen transitioned to using massive, unbroken panels of imported Venetian sheet glass. Instead of traditional abstract arrangements, these large mirror surfaces were integrated into a deeply theatrical spatial strategy designed to maximize interior luminosity and project an image of royal opulence.

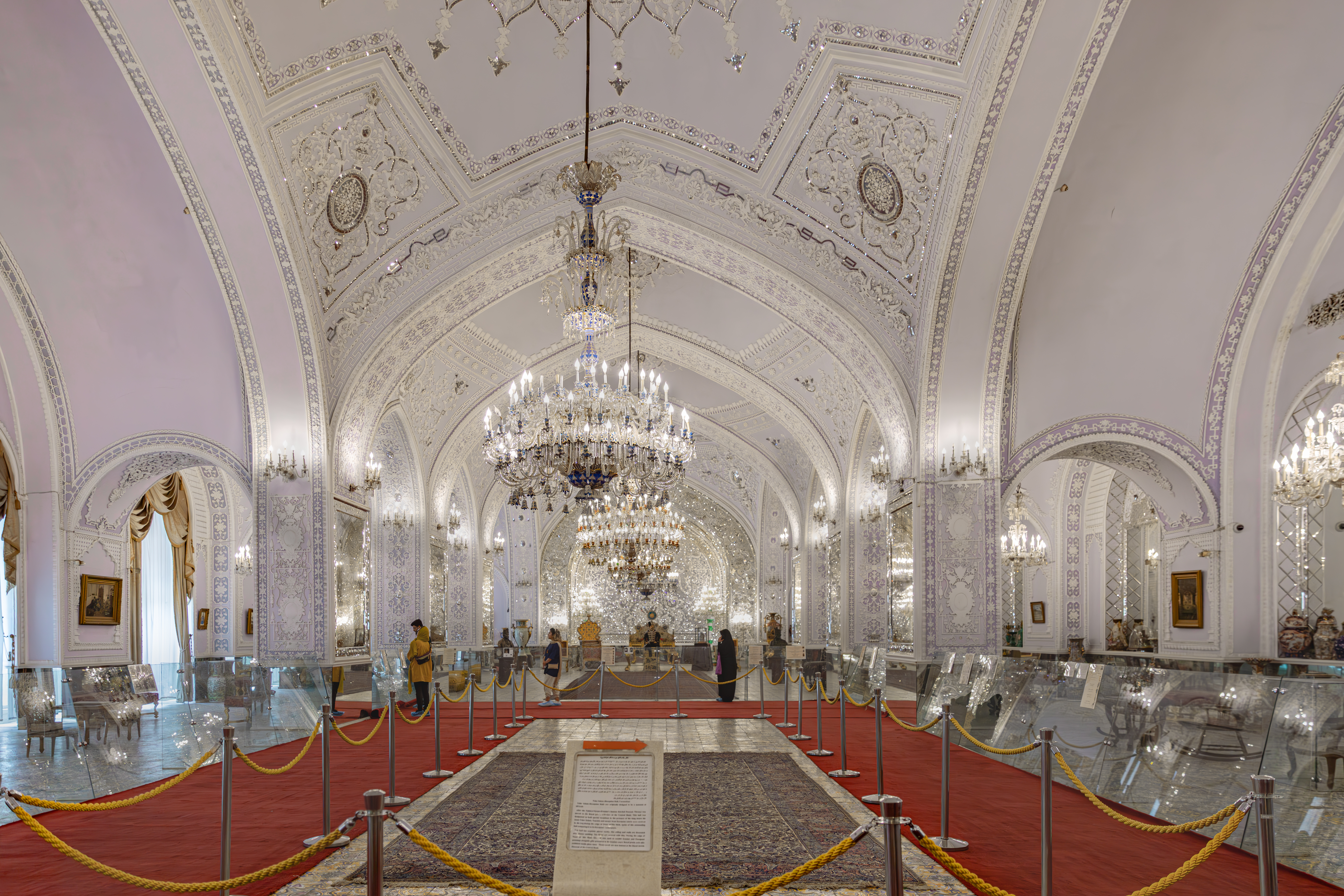
The Salam hall, initially constructed as a museum hall in 1873, Golestan Palace.

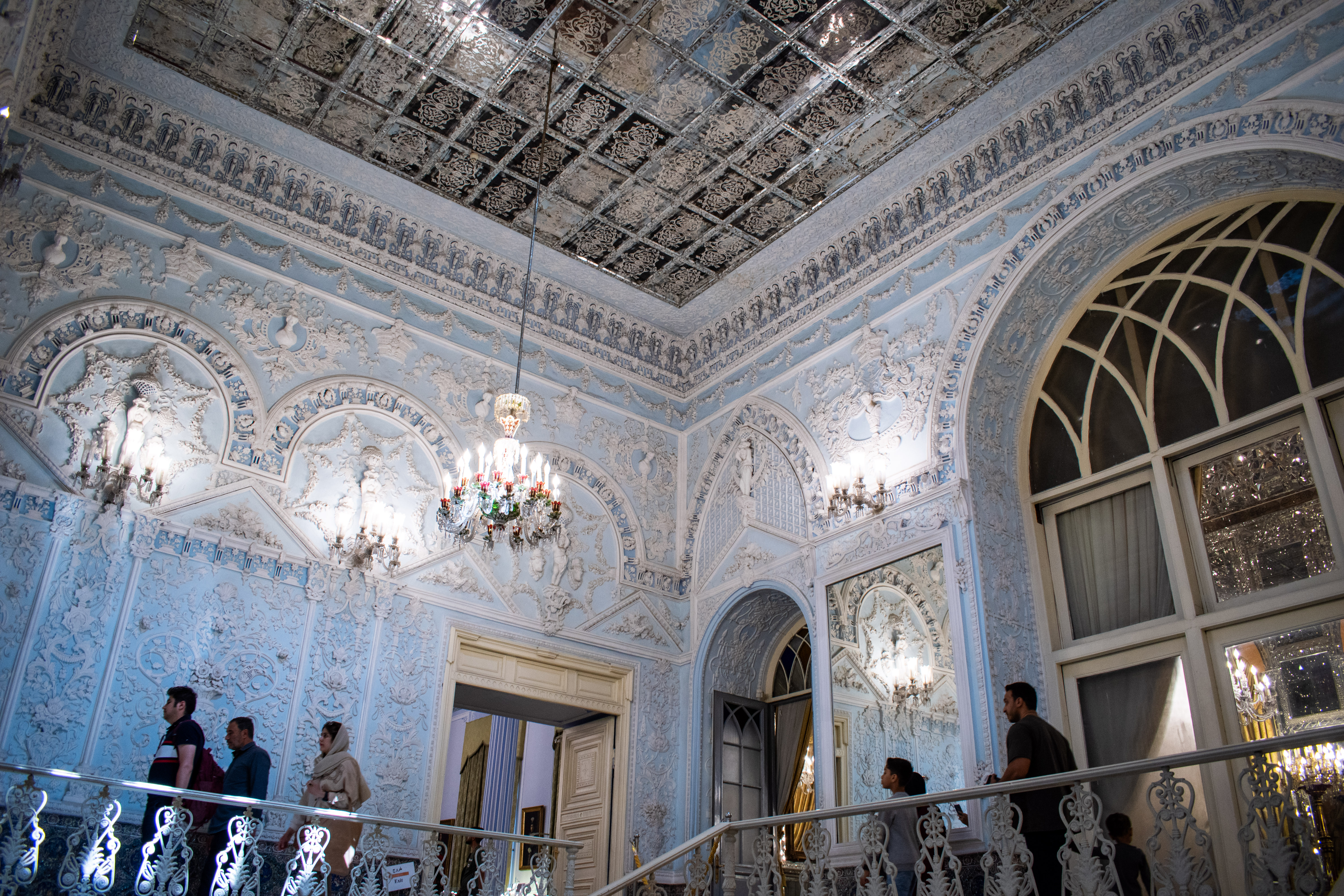
The stairs leading to the Salam hall, Golestan Palace

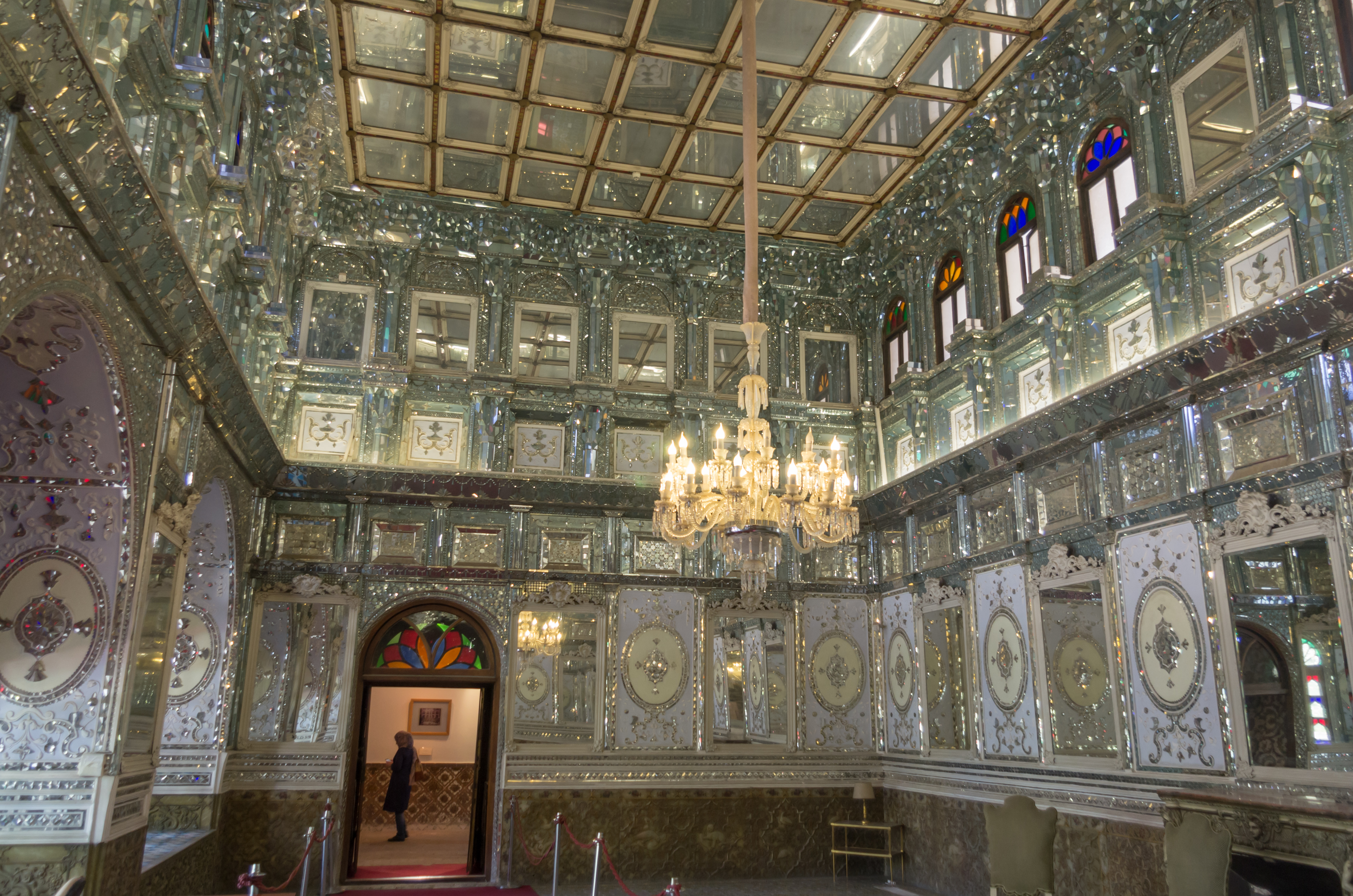
Shams-ol-Emareh, Golestan Palace

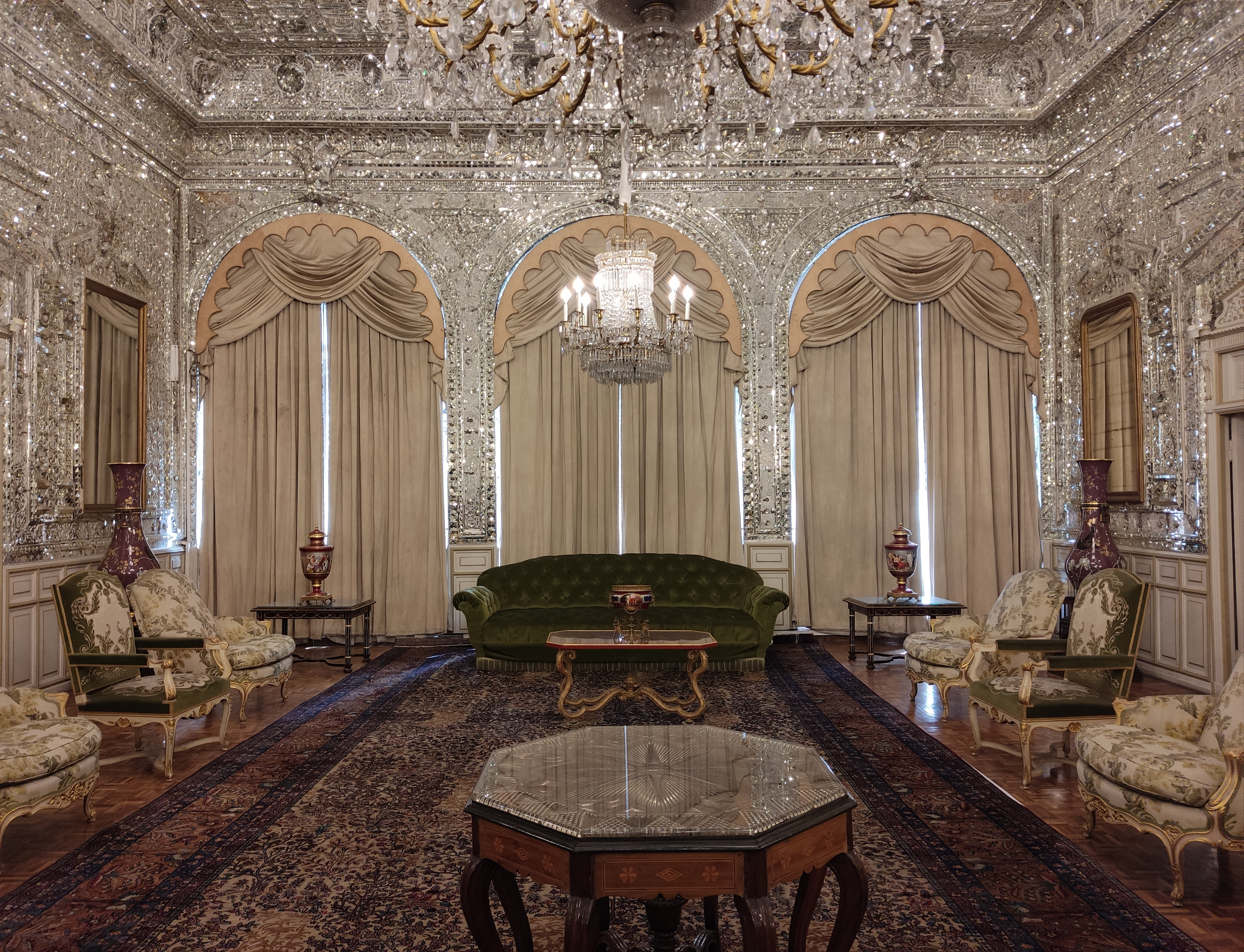
Berelian Hall, Golestan Palace

== Gallery ==
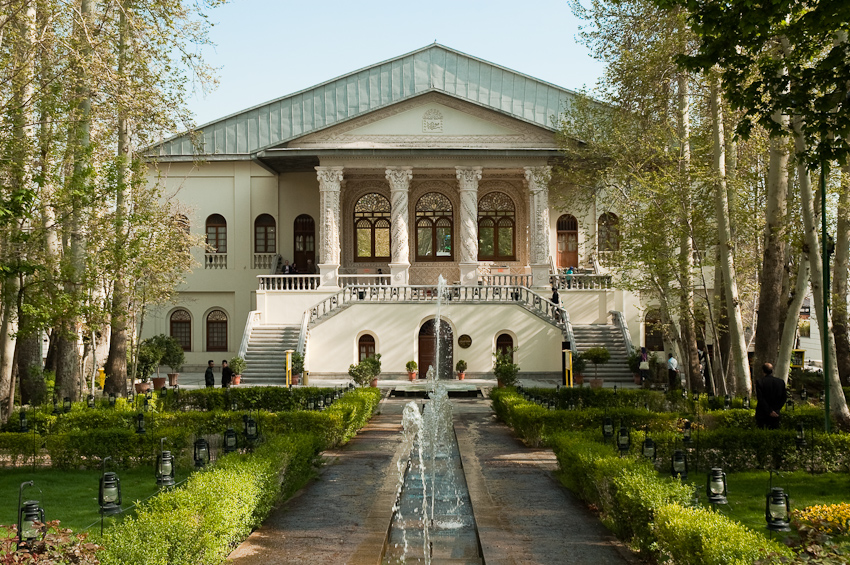
Ferdows Garden, 1840

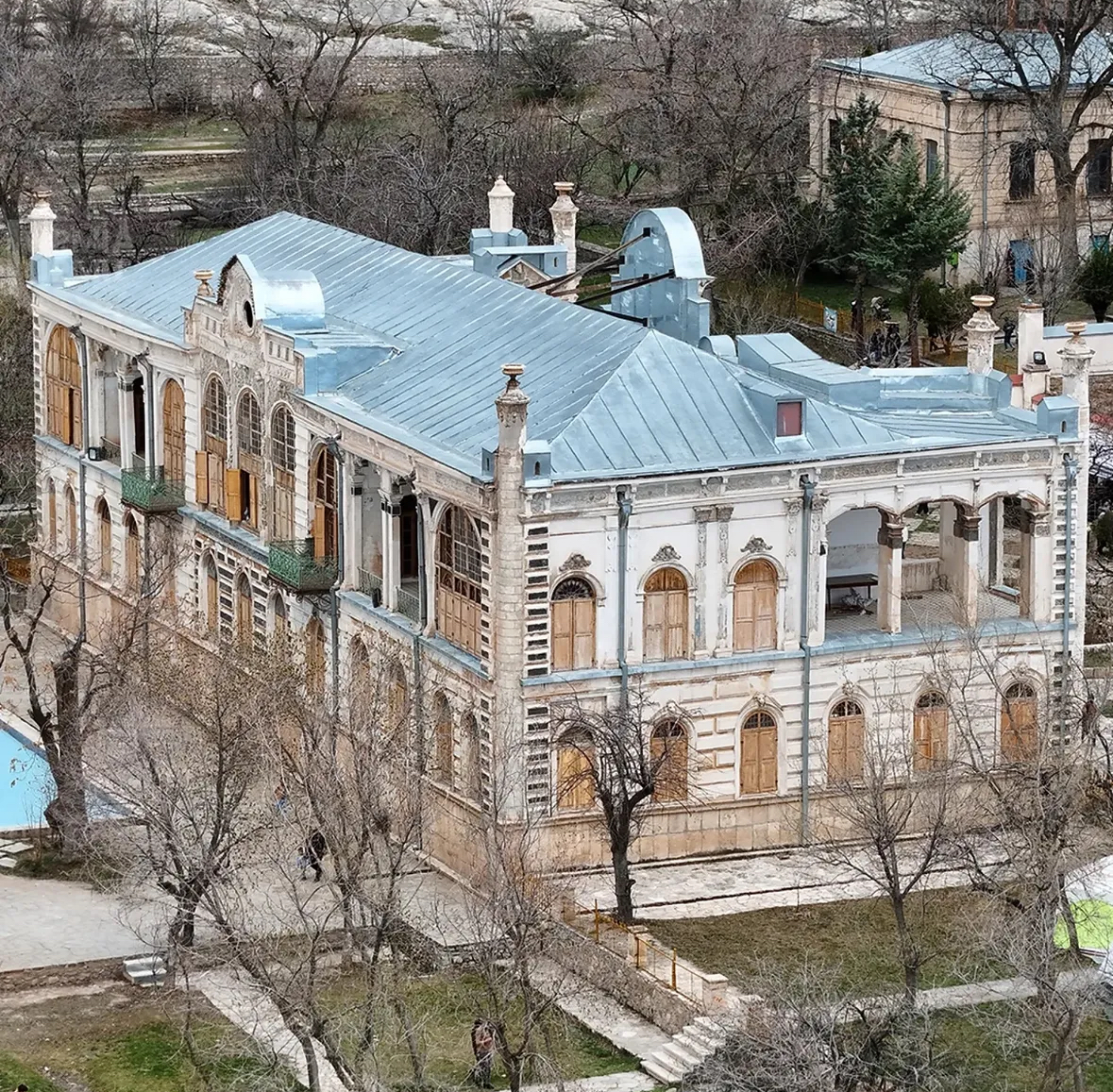
Baqcheh Jooq Palace, 1858

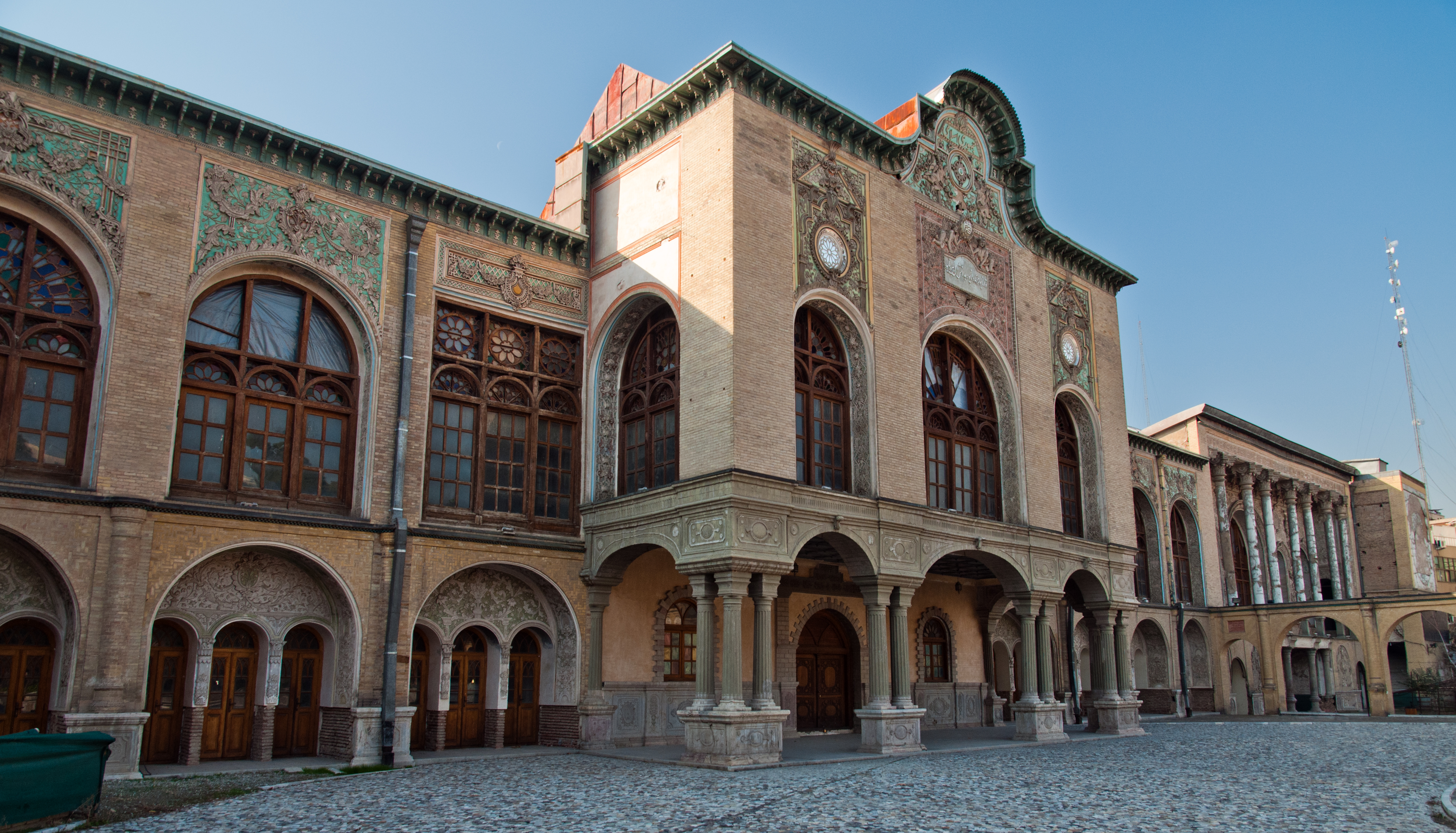
Masoudieh Mansion, 1878

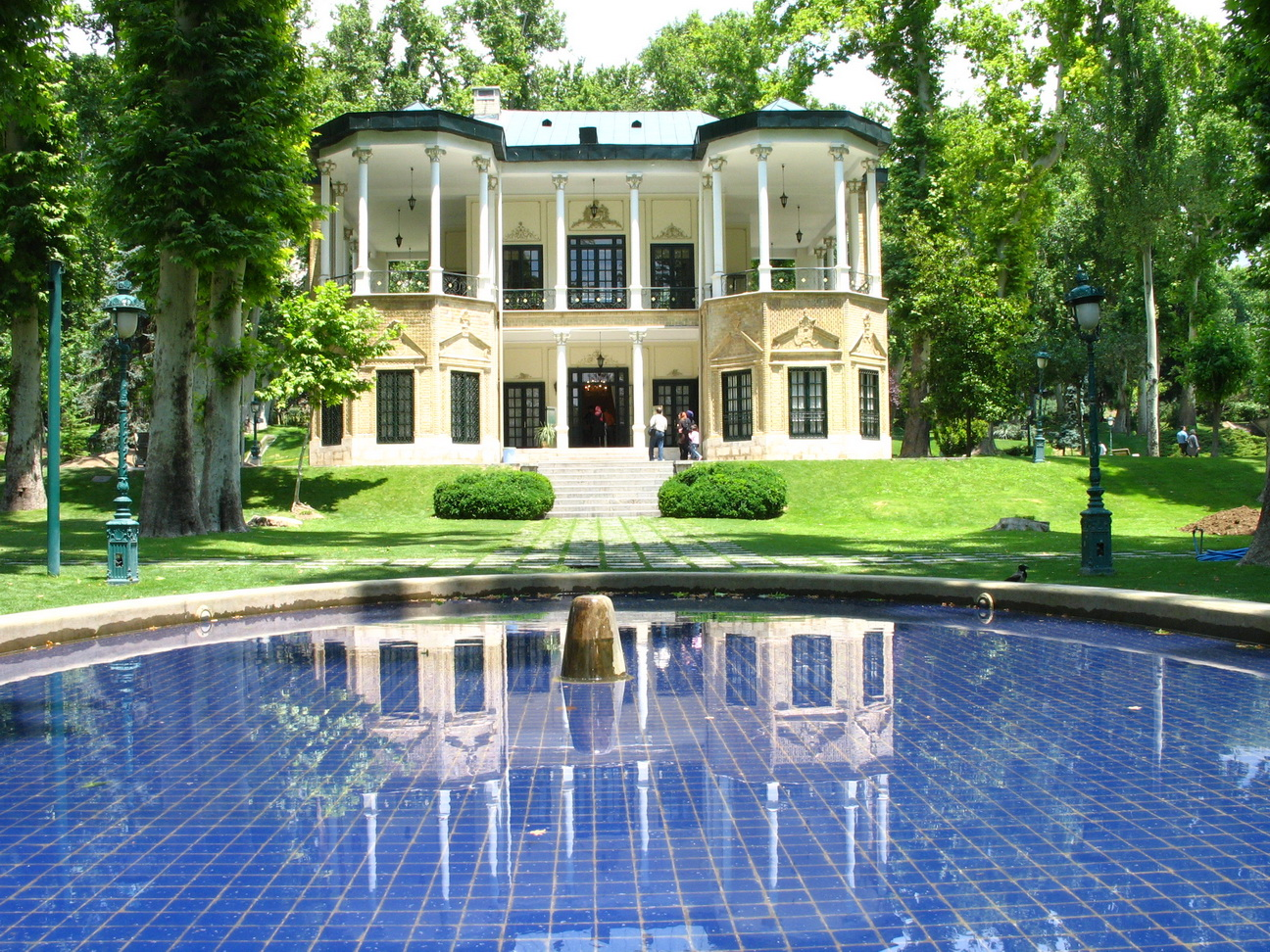
Ahmad Shahi Pavilion, 1910
