= Prime Minister of Iran =

Former political post in Iran

- نخست‌وزیر ایران
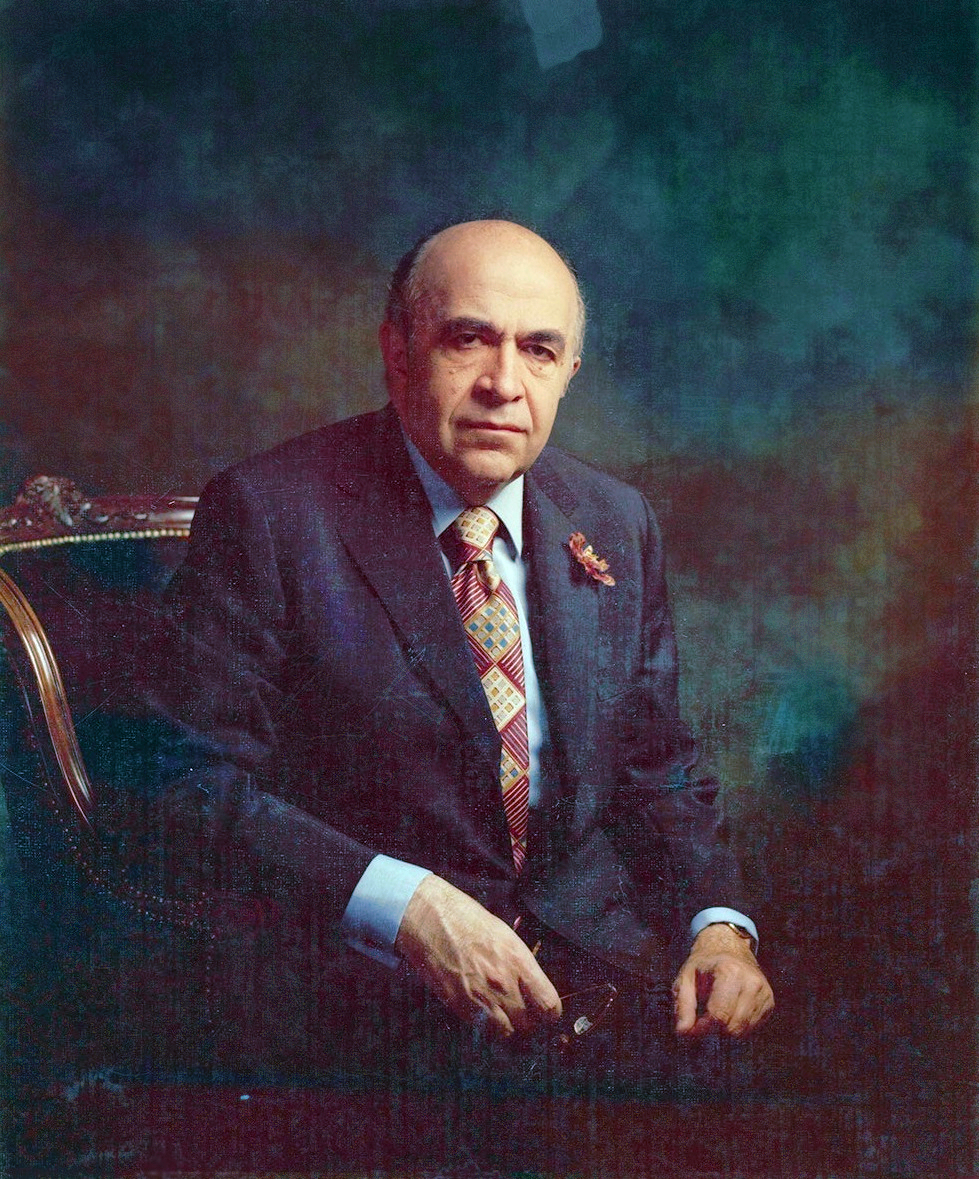
- Longest serving Amir-Abbas Hoveyda; 26 January 1965 – 7 August 1977
- Type: Head of government Commander-in-Chief of the Iranian Armed Forces (1925, 1952–1953)
- Status: Office abolished (Note: The post of prime minister was abolished as a result of the 1989 Iranian constitutional referendum.)
- Member of: Cabinet of Iran; Supreme National Security Council
- Residence: Palace Abyaz; Palace Prime Minister
- Nominator: President (1980–1989)
- Appointer: Shah (1906–1979) President (1980–1989), subject to the approval of Parliament (1980–1989)
- Constituting instrument: Supplementary Fundamental Law (1907); Constitution of the Islamic Republic (1979), Arts. 124 and 133–136
- Precursor: Grand Vizier of Persia
- Formation: 30 December 1906
- First holder: Mirza Nasrullah Khan
- Final holder: Mir-Hossein Mousavi
- Abolished: 16 August 1989
- Succession: President of Iran (as head of government)

Prime minister of Iran was a political post in Iran (Persia) during much of the 20th century. It began in 1906 during the Qajar dynasty, and continued into the Pahlavi dynasty from 1923 and, following the 1979 Iranian Revolution, into the Islamic Republic of Iran, before being abolished in 1989. After 1989 the responsibilities of prime minister were divided between the president and first vice president.

The constitution of the Constitutional Revolution contained no article defining the office, which developed instead through parliamentary convention. It was given a detailed definition for the first time in the 1979 constitution, which created a dual executive in which the president nominated the prime minister but could not remove him. Persistent conflict between the two offices was among the stated reasons for the constitutional revision of 1989, which abolished the post.

== History of the office ==
=== Qajar era ===
In the Qajar era, prime ministers were known by different titles. The post itself was mainly known as ataabak or ataabak-e a'zam (grand ataabak), or sometimes sadr-e a'zam (premier) at the beginning, but became ra'is ol-vozaraa (head of ministers) at the end. The title of nakhost vazir (prime minister) was rarely used. The prime minister was usually called by the honorific title hazrat-e ashraf. Reza Khan Sardar Sepah became the last prime minister of the Qajar dynasty in 1923.

For a list of Iranian 'prime ministers' prior to 1907 see List of grand viziers of Persia.

=== Pahlavi era ===
In 1925, Reza Shah became the Shah of Iran. He installed Mohammad Ali Foroughi as the prime minister. In 1941 his son Mohammad Reza Pahlavi became Shah. He installed Mohammad-Ali Foroughi as the prime minister too. In 1951, Mohammad Mosaddegh became Prime Minister but was overthrown in a coup d'état in 1953. Amir-Abbas Hoveyda became Prime minister of Iran in 1965 and remained in office until 1977, he was the longest to serve the title. Shapour Bakhtiar was the last Prime Minister of the Pahlavi era.

=== Islamic Republic of Iran ===
After the Iranian Revolution of 1979, Ayatollah Ruhollah Khomeini installed Mehdi Bazargan as the Prime Minister of an interim government, which served until November 1979. Bazargan's resignation letter is dated 14 Aban 1358 (5 November 1979), the day after the seizure of the United States embassy. It does not mention the embassy, citing instead "interference, obstruction, opposition and differences of opinion" and the need for unity of management. Khomeini accepted the resignation the following day and entrusted the administration of the country to the Revolutionary Council.

The post was left empty until Abolhassan Banisadr became president in January 1980 and chose Mohammad-Ali Rajai as his prime minister, mainly because of pressures imposed by Majlis representatives, especially those close to the Islamic Republican Party. Rajai served in the post until Banisadr's impeachment in June 1981, and was elected as president in the elections of July 24, 1981. Rajai chose Mohammad Javad Bahonar as his prime minister, but they were assassinated together in the Prime Minister's office only a few weeks later on August 30, 1981.

When Ali Khamenei became president in the elections of October 1981, he first introduced right-leaning Ali Akbar Velayati to the Majlis as his prime minister, but he was voted down by the then left-leaning majority of the parliament, which then forced their preferred prime minister to Khamenei, namely Mir-Hossein Mousavi. The dispute finally ended following intervention by the Supreme Leader, Ayatollah Khomeini, who advised the president to accept Mousavi.

Mousavi served under the title until 1989, when the constitution was amended to abolish the title of Prime Minister and divide his responsibilities between the president and a newly created title of first Vice President.

== Constitutional basis ==
=== Constitutional Revolution and the Pahlavi era ===
The Supplementary Fundamental Law of 1907 made ministers individually and collectively responsible to the two chambers of parliament and treated their appointment and dismissal as a prerogative of the shah, but it contained no article defining the office of head of government in its own right. The position of the raʾis al-vozarāʾ therefore took shape largely through convention, including the practice of seeking a vote of inclination (raʾy-e tamāyol) from the Majlis before a royal decree of appointment was issued.

According to Abbas Amanat, the ministers of the Pahlavi period were "a modern equivalent of the old divan" and were exposed even more than their Qajar predecessors to the wishes of the shah, a continuity he attributes to the tenacity of a political culture that persisted after the Constitutional Revolution. Much of the political conflict of Mohammad Mosaddegh's two years in office took the form of a constitutional crisis over the extent of the prime minister's powers.

=== Provisional government, 1979 ===
By a decree dated 15 Bahman 1357 (4 February 1979), read publicly the following day, Ruhollah Khomeini appointed Mehdi Bazargan to form a provisional government. The decree grounded the appointment not in any constitution but in what it described as a legitimate religious right together with a legal right "arising from the votes of the overwhelming majority of the people of Iran", expressed through mass demonstrations. For several days Iran had two prime ministers, since Shapour Bakhtiar, appointed by Mohammad Reza Pahlavi and confirmed by a parliamentary vote of confidence, continued to describe himself as the constitutional prime minister until his government collapsed on 11 February 1979.

The provisional government operated with no new constitution in force. By Bazargan's own account, the statute drawn up for the Revolutionary Council provided that the existing constitution would remain the framework, minus those provisions concerning the shah, which passed to the leader of the revolution, and that the Council would take the place of parliament. Bazargan described the arrangement publicly as the existing constitution "minus the monarchy" remaining in force. The Council was at the same time treated as the country's legislative authority, and hundreds of measures issued from it. The government was meanwhile confronted by the parallel institutions of the revolutionary committees, courts and guards, which successive attempts at subordination left more firmly established.

Bazargan's resignation letter is dated 14 Aban 1358 (5 November 1979), the day after the seizure of the United States embassy. It makes no mention of the embassy, citing instead "interference, obstruction, opposition and differences of opinion" and the need for unity of management. Khomeini accepted the resignation the next day in a decree that simultaneously charged the Revolutionary Council with "the administration of the affairs of the country in the period of transition", together with preparing the constitutional referendum, parliamentary elections and the election of a president. The office itself was left vacant.

=== The 1979 constitution ===
The constitution approved in December 1979 defined the office in detail for the first time and gave it a separate subsection. With the approval of the Majlis the president could appoint a prime minister (Article 124), but the prime minister could be dismissed only by the Majlis through a vote of no confidence (Article 135). The result was a dual executive in which authority was divided between an elected president and a premier who did not depend on him for his tenure, and disputes between the two offices recurred from the presidency of Abolhassan Banisadr onwards.

=== 1989 revision and abolition ===
Friction between President Ali Khamenei and the government led by Mir-Hossein Mousavi over reconstruction policy intensified after the July 1988 ceasefire with Iraq, and led to open expressions of dissatisfaction with the constitutional division of executive power between the president and the prime minister. On 4 Ordibehesht 1368 (24 April 1989) Khomeini ordered a revision of the constitution, setting out eight subjects for the assembly to consider. The second consisted of eight words: "concentration in the management of the executive". Mousavi was himself named among the twenty members of the revision council.

The amendments were approved in the referendum of 28 July 1989. The post of prime minister was abolished and its functions transferred to the president, and Article 124, which had previously governed the nomination of the prime minister, was rewritten to allow the president to appoint deputies, the first of whom would direct the cabinet. The constitution has not been amended since.

== See also ==
- List of grand viziers of Persia
- History of Iran
- List of prime ministers of Iran

== Sources ==
- For a full list of Viziers of Iran in the last 2000 years, see: "Iranian Viziers: From Bozorgmehr to Amir Kabir" (وزیران ایرانی از بزرگمهر تا امیر کبیر) by Abdolrafi' Haqiqat (عبدالرفیع حقیقت). Perry–Castañeda Library collection DS 271 F34 1995
- Mohammad Taghi Bahar, Taarikh-e Mokhtasar-e Ahzaab-e Siaasi-e Iraan (A Short History of Political Parties of Iran), Amirkabir, 1978.
- Encyclopædia Iranica's entries on "Ala-al-Saltana, Mohammad-Ali" and "Akbar Sepahdar-e Azam, Fathallah"
- various articles in The Persian Encyclopedia
- 'Alí Rizā Awsatí (عليرضا اوسطى), Iran in the Past Three Centuries (Irān dar Se Qarn-e Goz̲ashteh - ايران در سه قرن گذشته), Volumes 1 and 2 (Paktāb Publishing - انتشارات پاکتاب, Tehran, Iran, 2003). ISBN 964-93406-6-1 (Vol. 1), ISBN 964-93406-5-3 (Vol. 2).

Head of government of Iran
Preceded by Grand Vizier of Iran	Prime Minister of Iran; 1906–1989	Succeeded by President of Iran
