= Masoudieh Mansion =

National heritage site in Tehran, Iran

Coordinates: 35.6890°N 51.4281°E

Masoudieh mansion
- عمارت مسعودیه
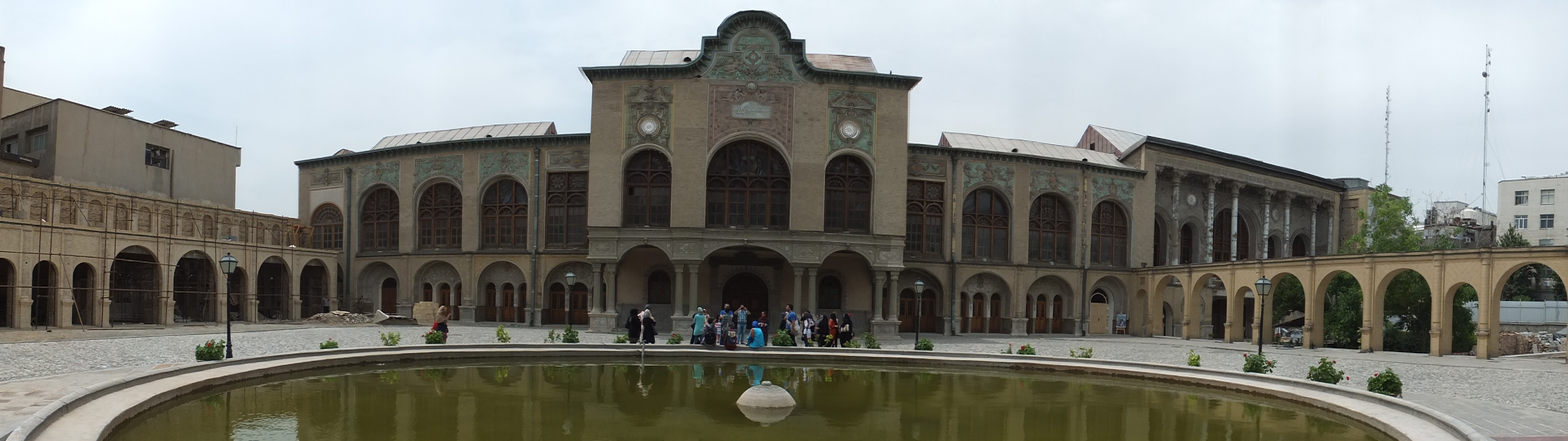
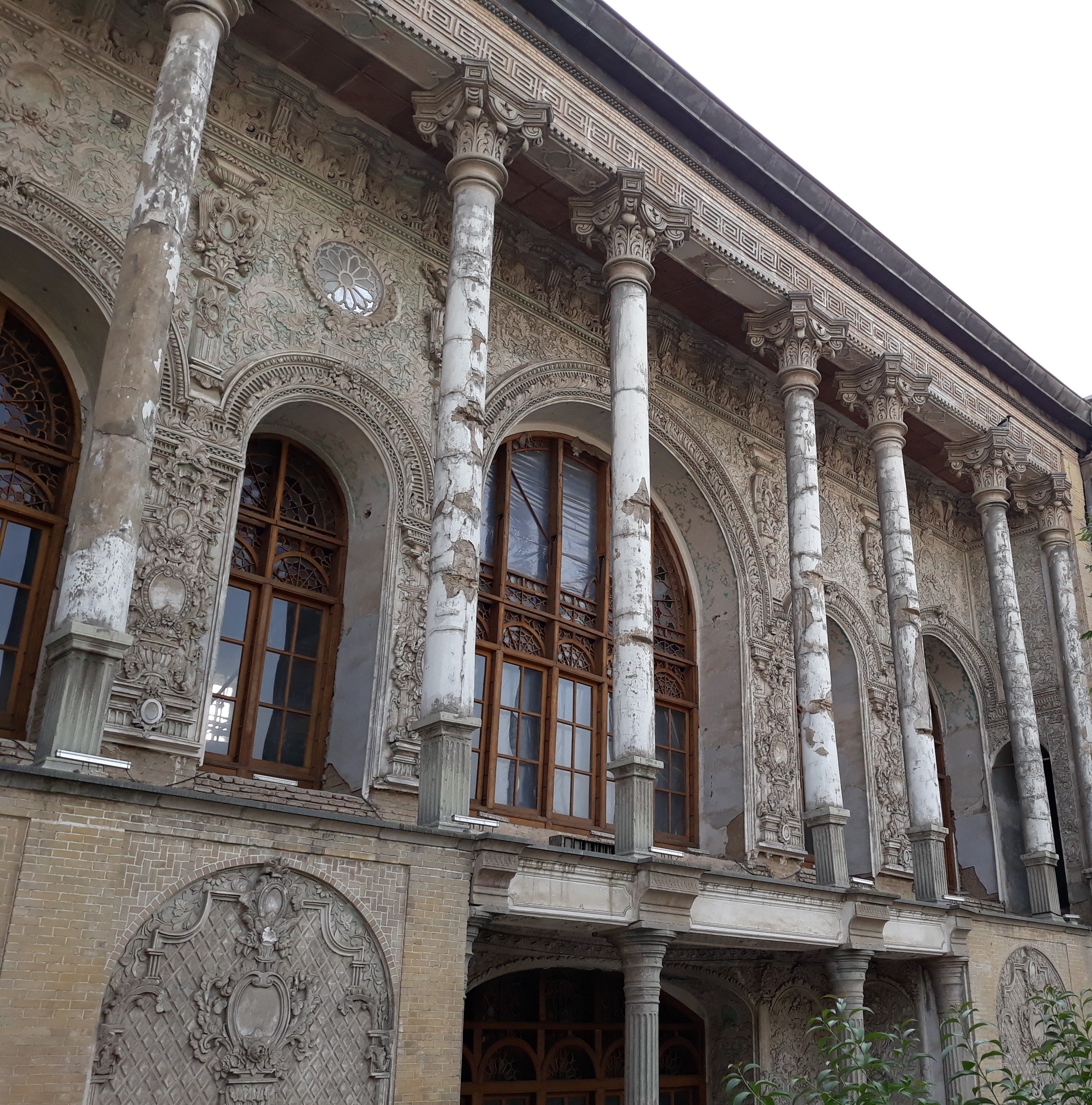
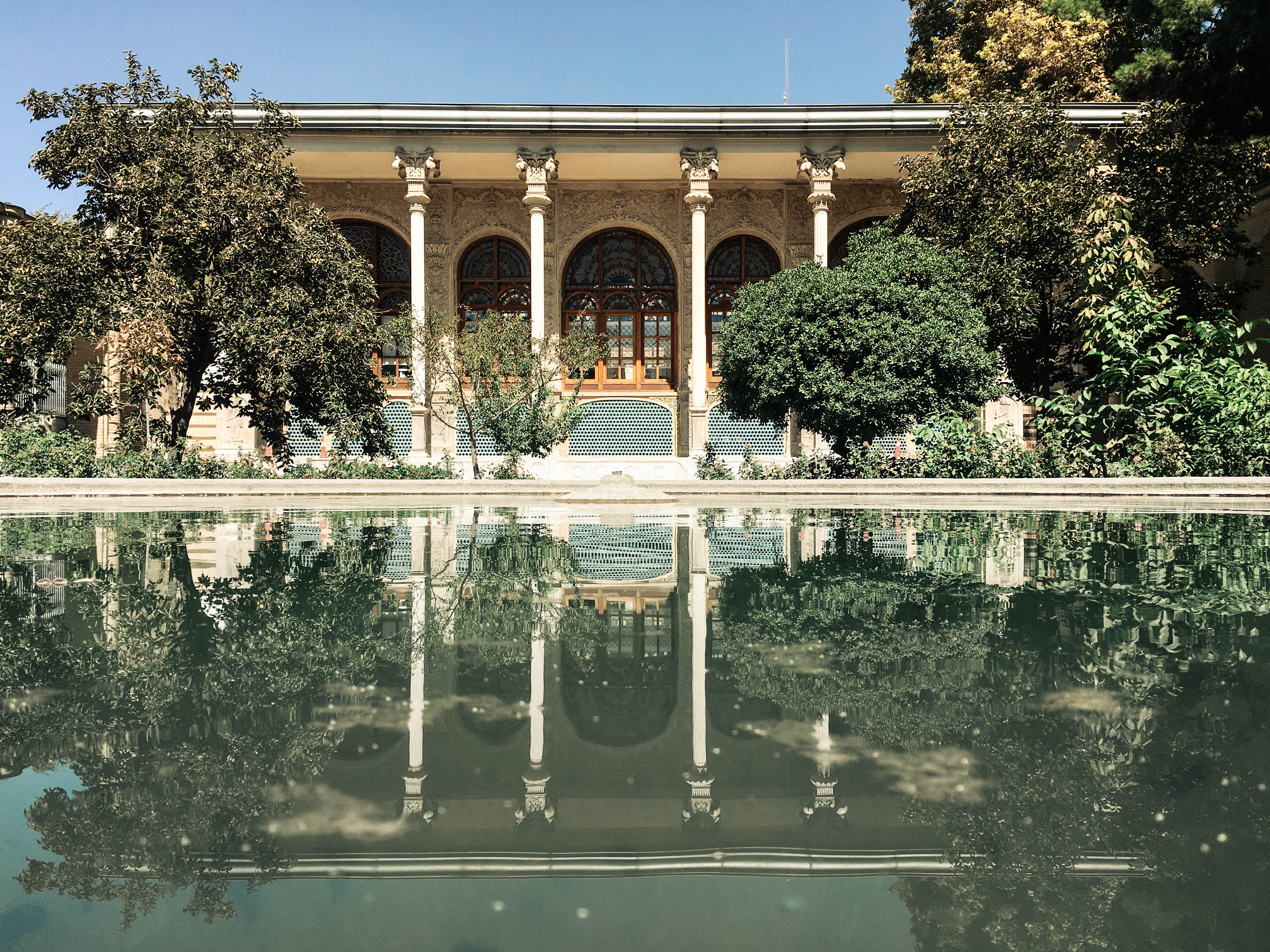
- Interactive map of the Masoudieh mansion area

General information
- Architectural style: Qajaresque Neo-Baroque architecture
- Location: Tehran, Iran, Baharestan square
- Completed: 1878

The Masoudieh Mansion (Persian: عمارت مسعودیه, romanized: Emarat-e Masoudieh) is a historic mansion in Tehran, Iran. It was built as a residence for the Qajar prince Mass'oud Mirza Zell-e Soltan in 1878, hence the name Masoudieh.

== History ==
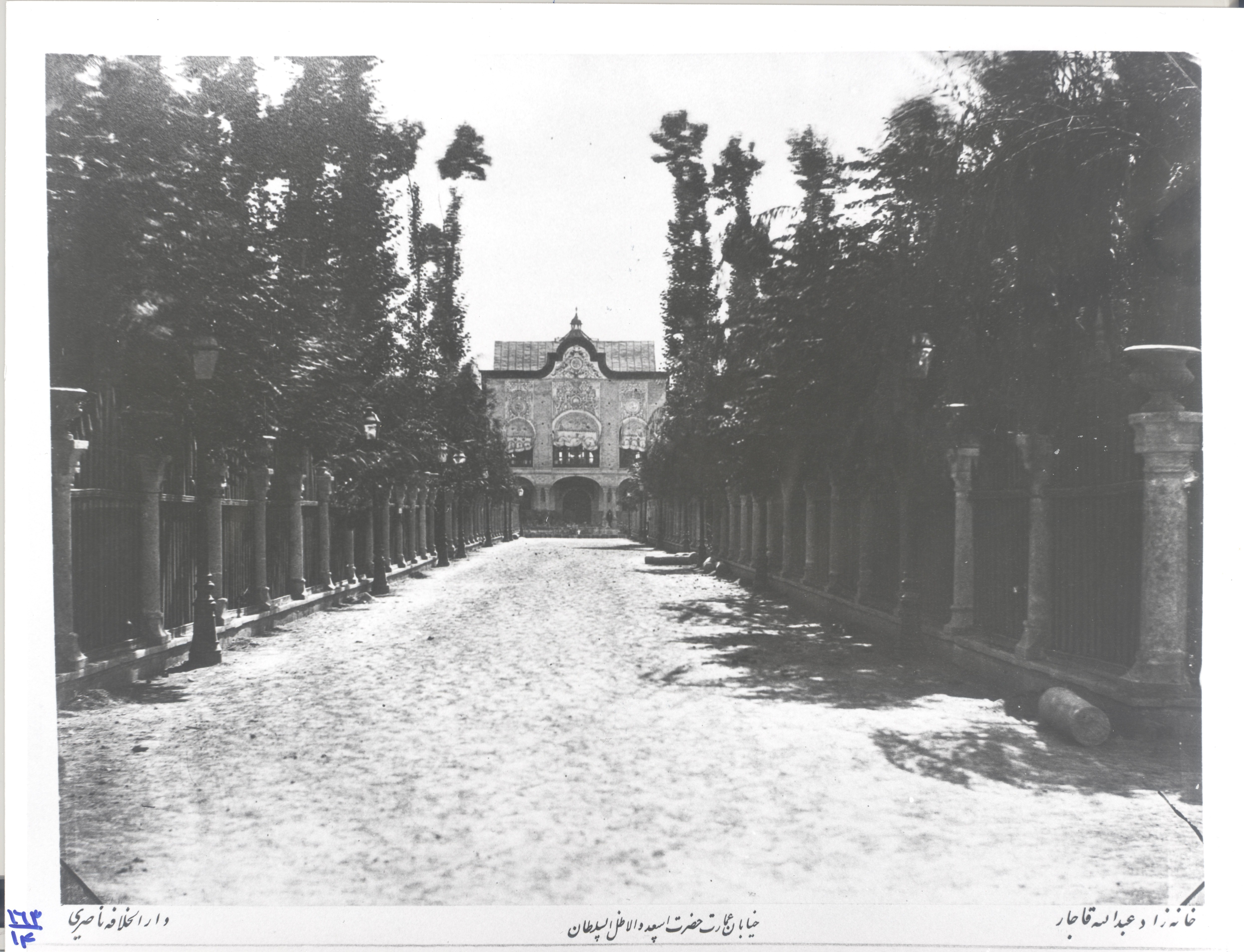
Photograph of Masoudieh mansion by Abdollah Mirza Qajar, late 19th century

Masoudieh has gone through many historical events ever since it was built. During the Persian Constitutional Revolution, due to the disagreements between Zell-e Soltan and Mozaffar ad-Din Shah (and later Mohammad Ali Shah), the mansion became a revolutionary foothold. In 1908, a handmade bomb exploded under the Shah's carriage near the mansion, causing him to initiate the 1908 bombardment of the parliament.

Many of the first cultural institutions of Iran were first founded in Masoudieh. For example, the first national library and the first National Museum of Iran were established in this place.

For a short time between 1963–1964, the mansion was used as military college. It was later given to the Ministry of Education after its establishment. On 1 March 1998, the government decided to give the building to the Society for the National Heritage of Iran (that had not yet become a ministry and operated under Ministry of Culture and Islamic Guidance). On 17 January 1999, it was listed among Iran's National Heritage List as the number 2190 in the list. In 2011–2013, its Qajar remains were investigated by the Iranian archaeologist Naser Norouzadeh Chegini.

== Architecture ==
The garden of the Masoudieh Mansion was built by the order of Mass'oud Mirza Zell-e Soltan, a son of Naser al-Din Shah Qajar, in 1295. It was built by the work of Reza Qoli Khan (nicknamed Siraj al-Mulk) on a land with an area of about 4000 square meters, with an exterior (diwan house) and an interior, alongside annexes.

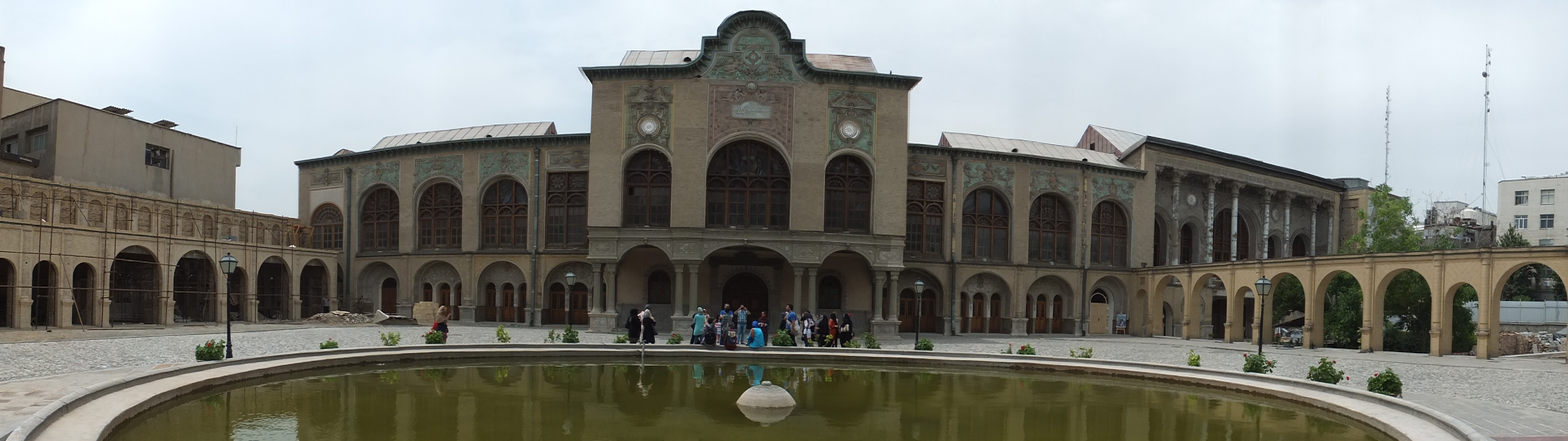
Entrance of Masoudiyeh mansion, Baharestan square

== Gallery ==
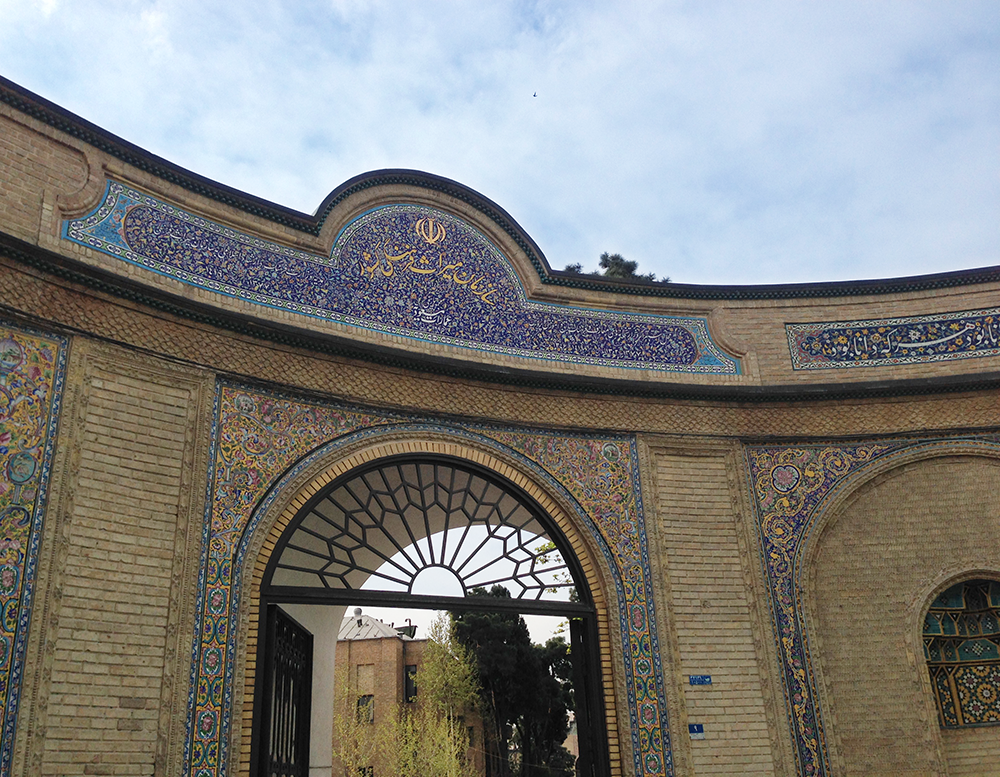
Entrance of Masoudiyeh mansion, Baharestan square

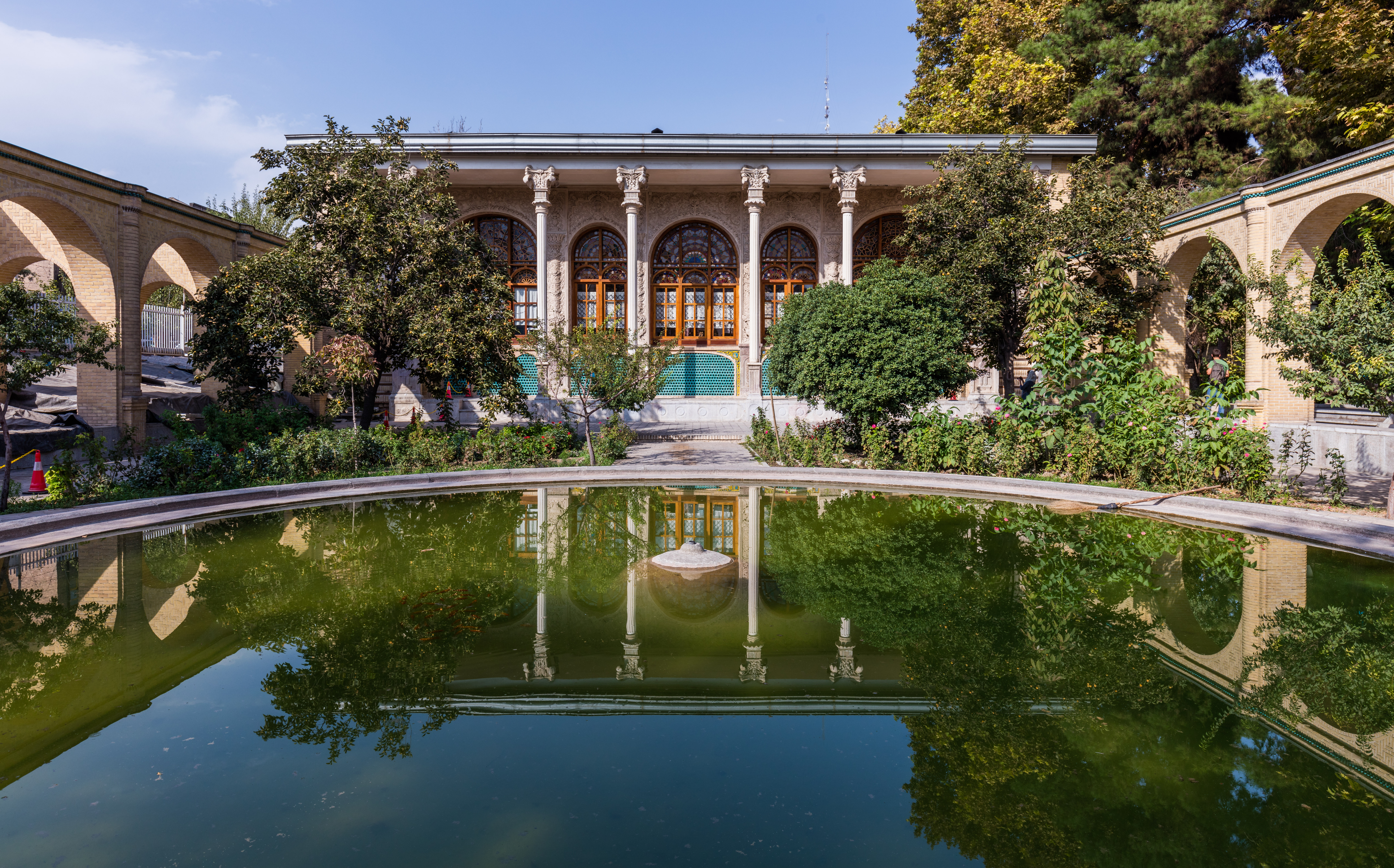

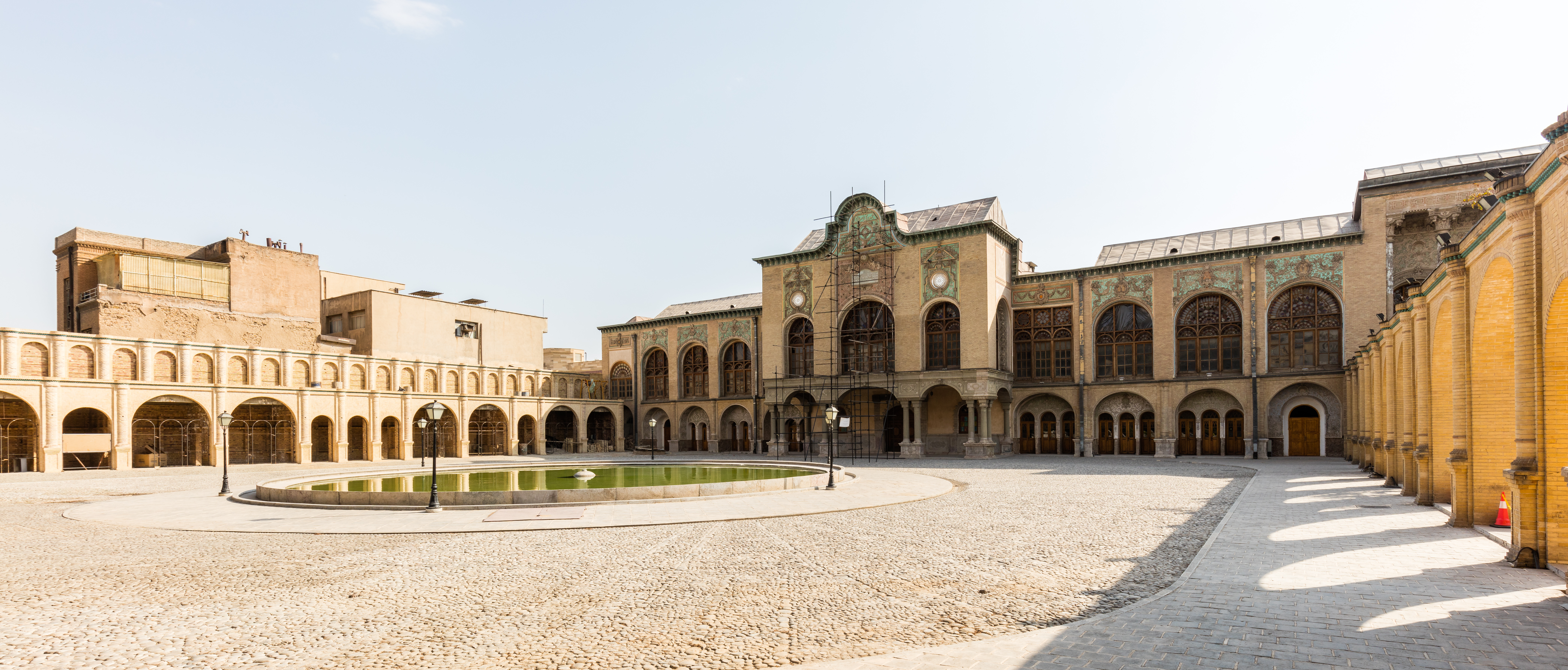

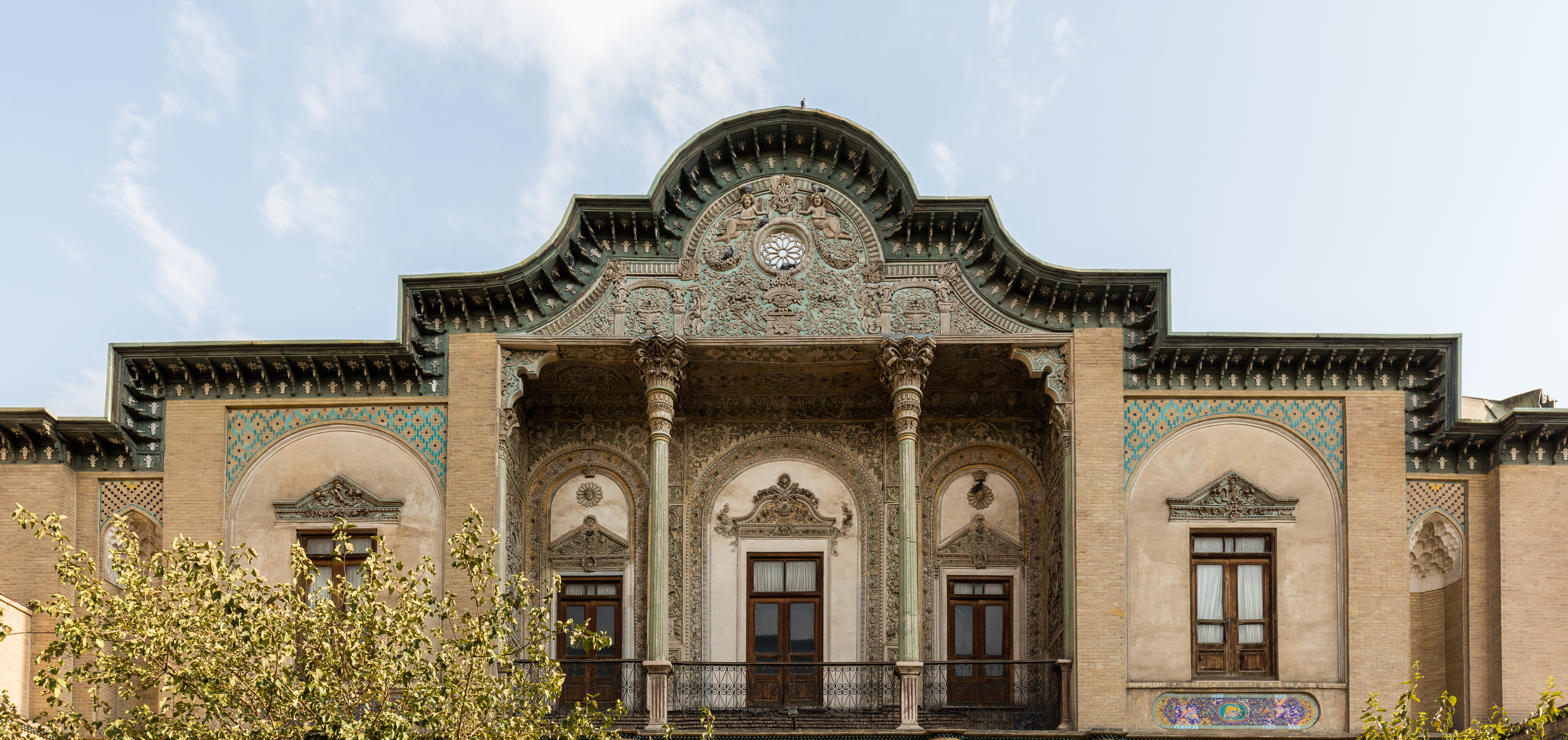

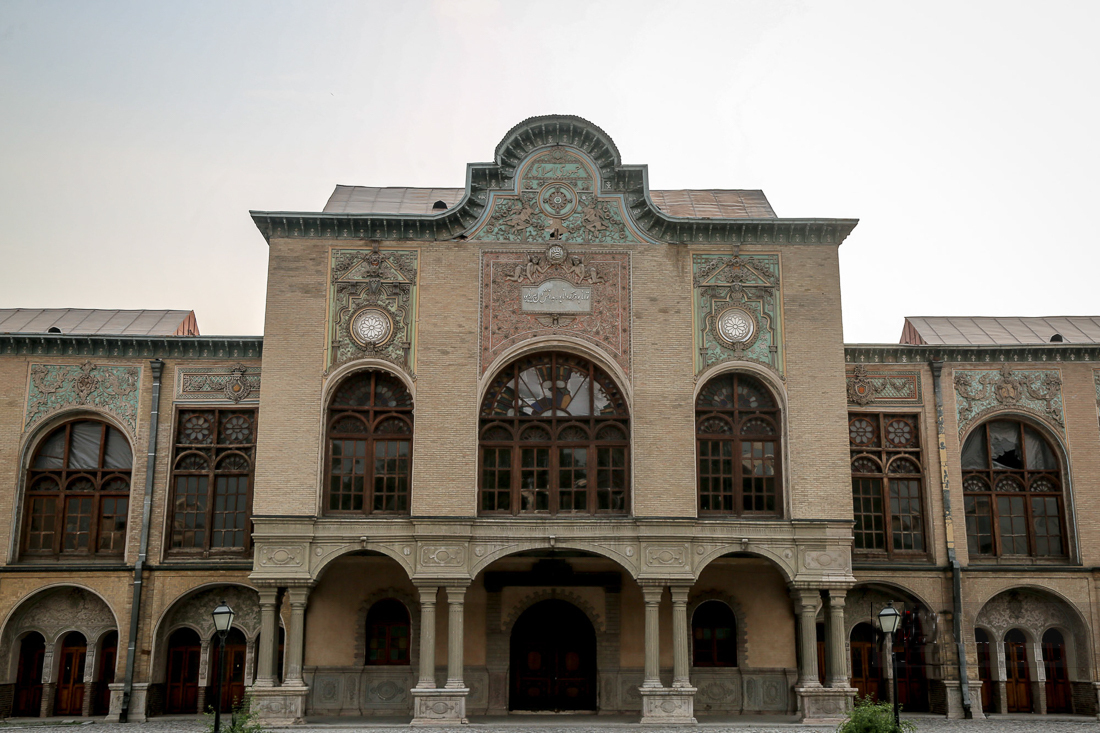

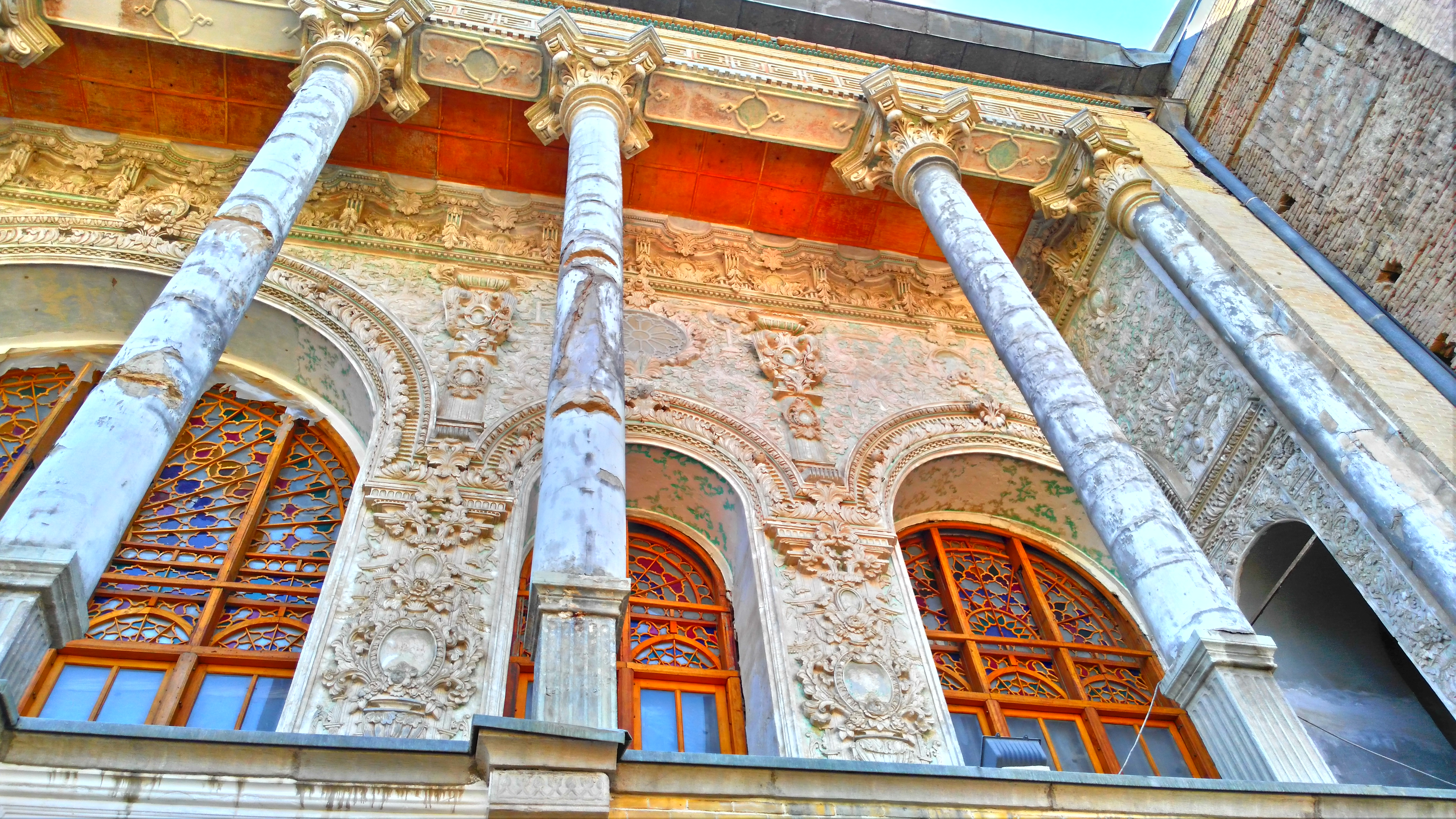

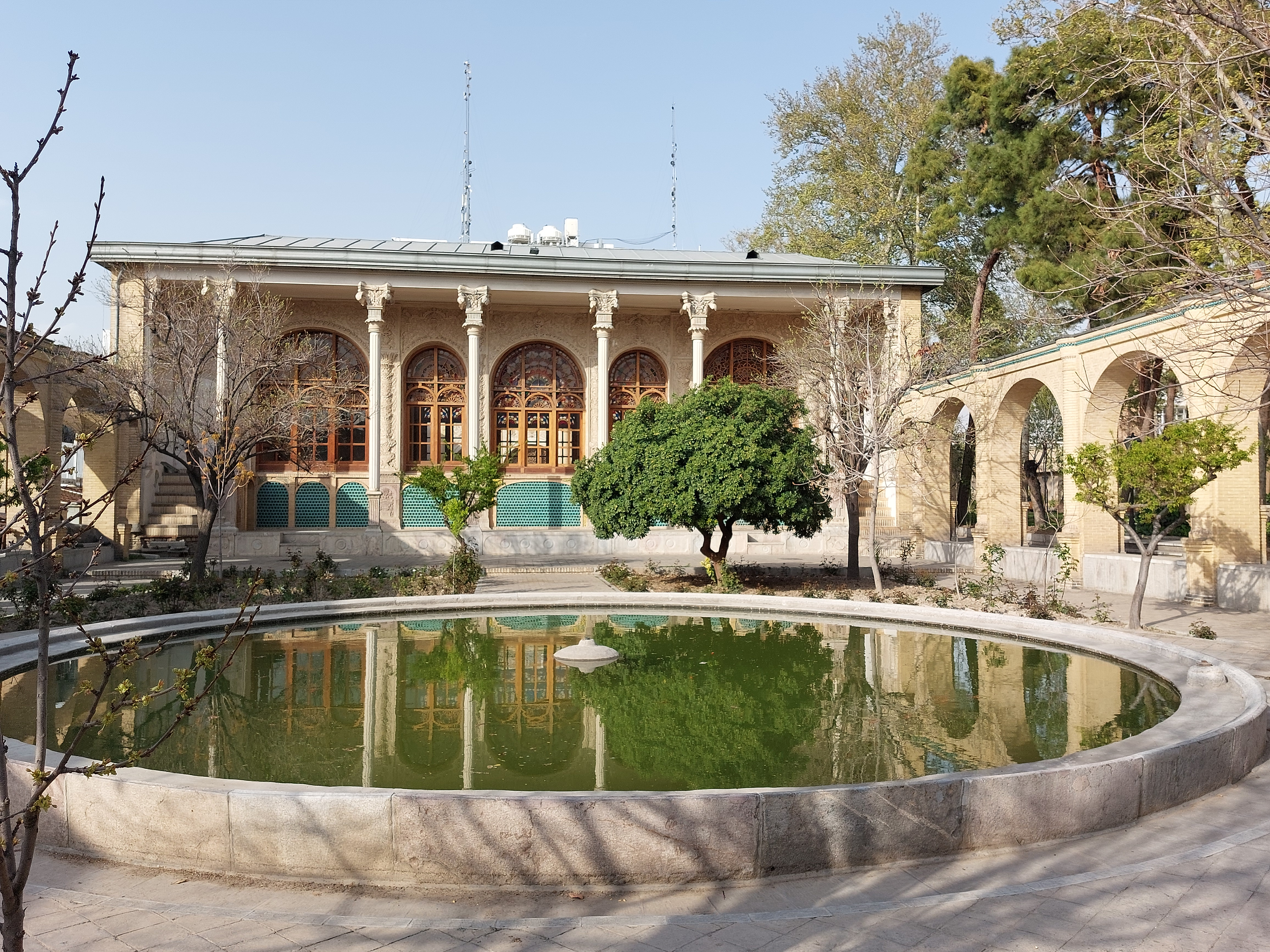

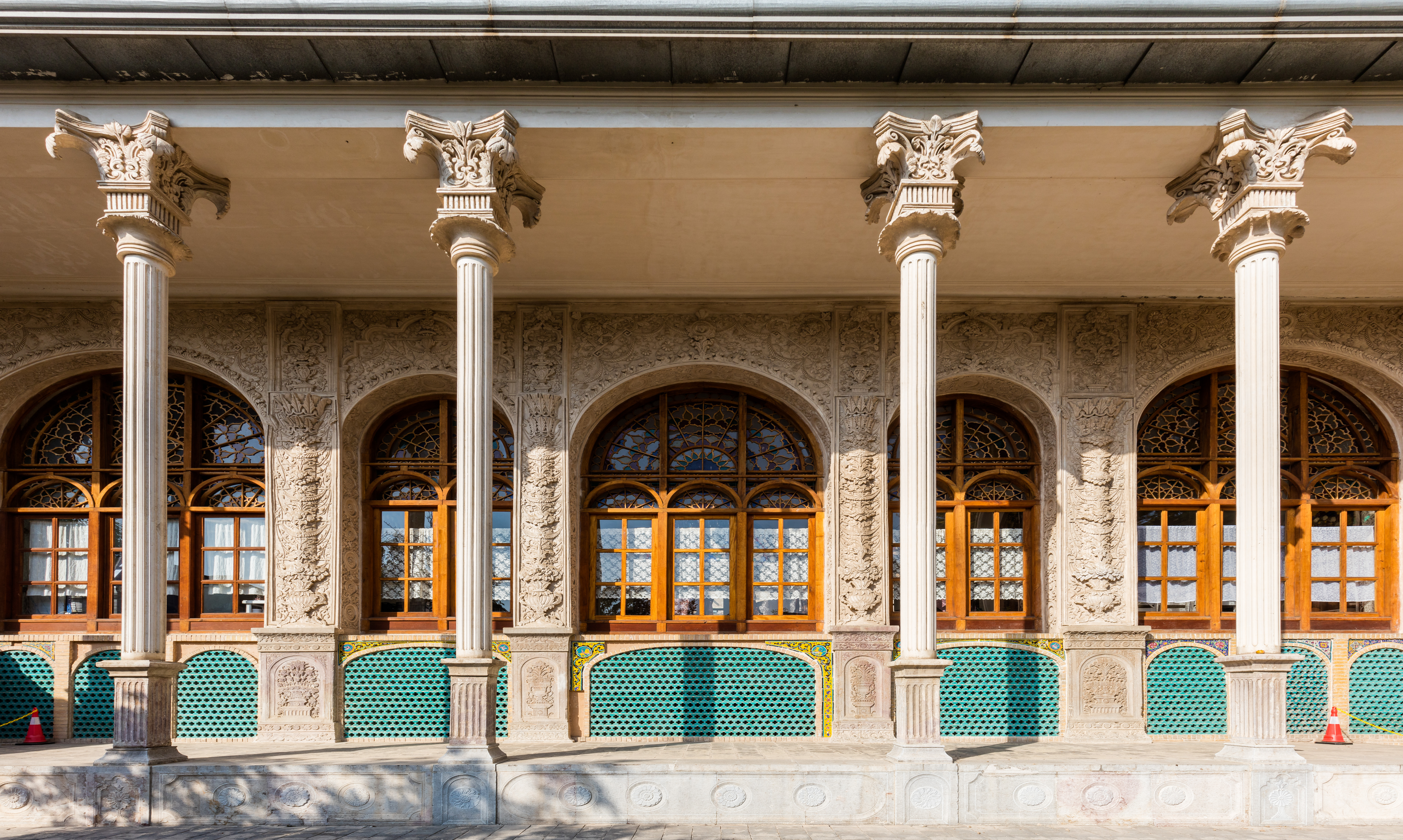

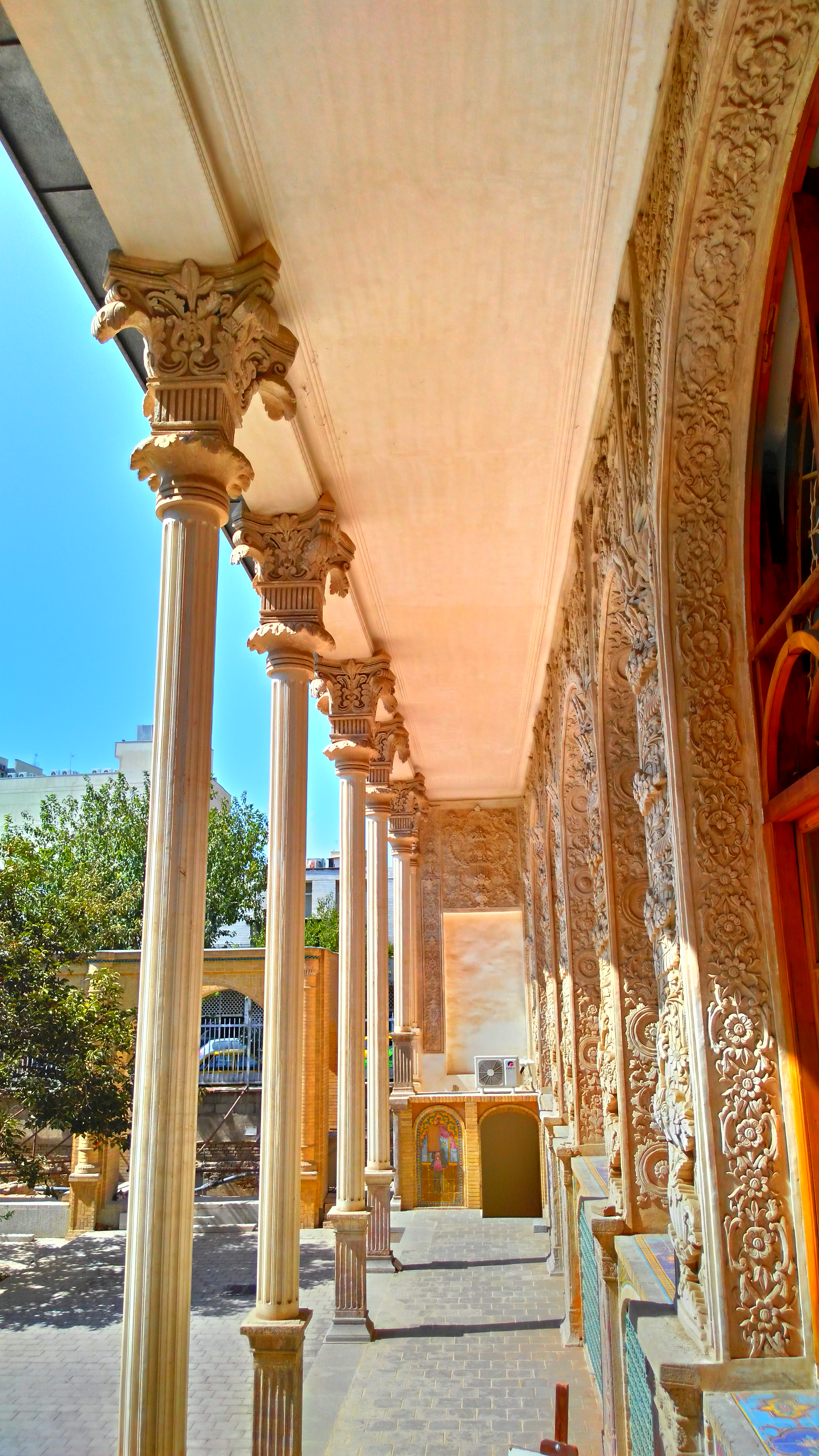

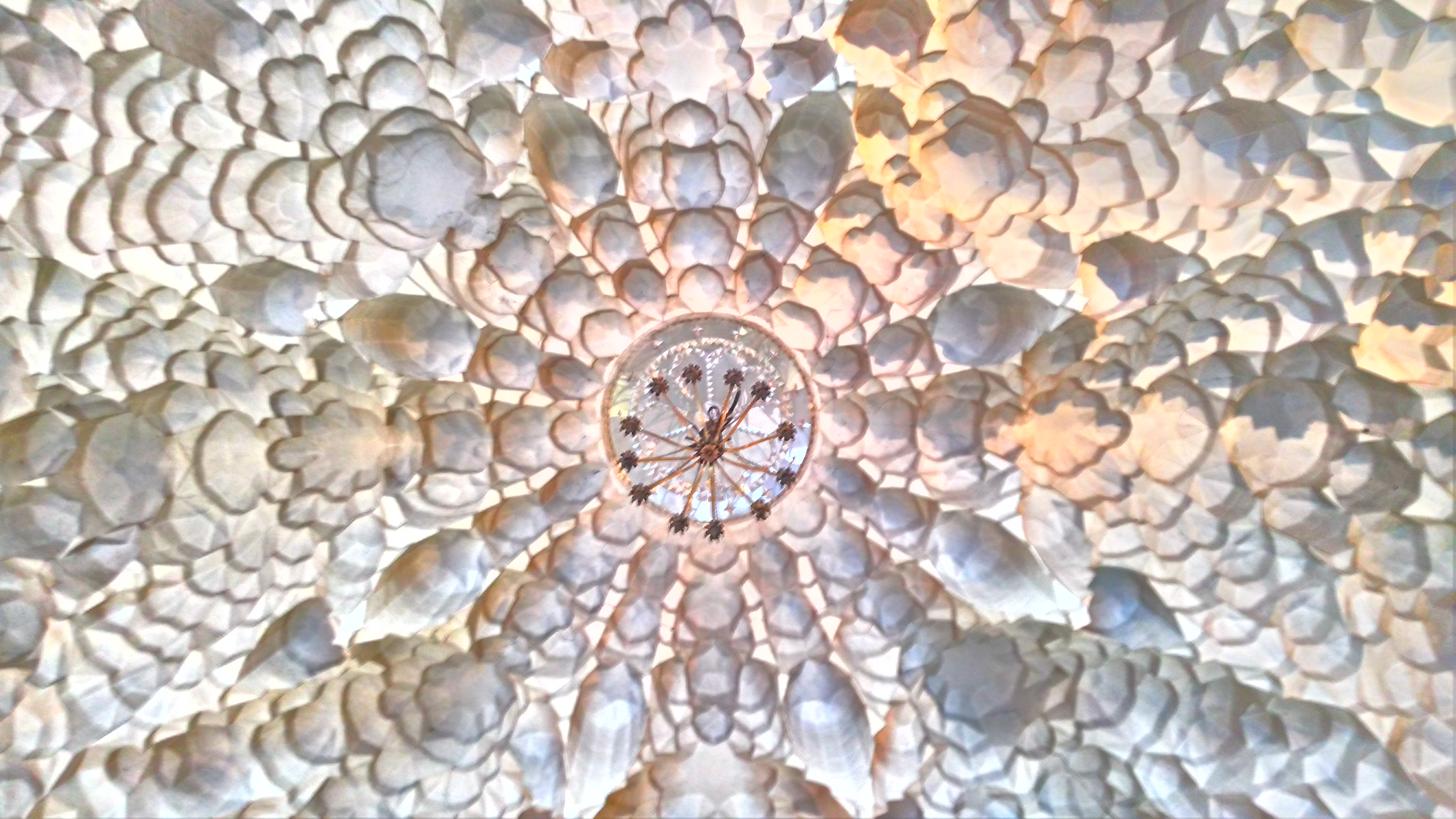

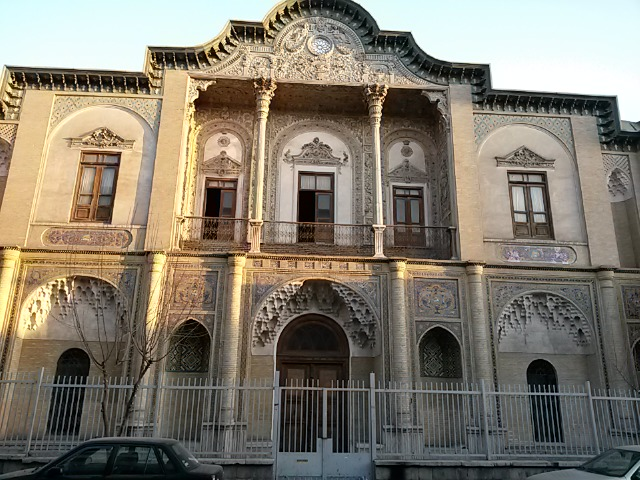

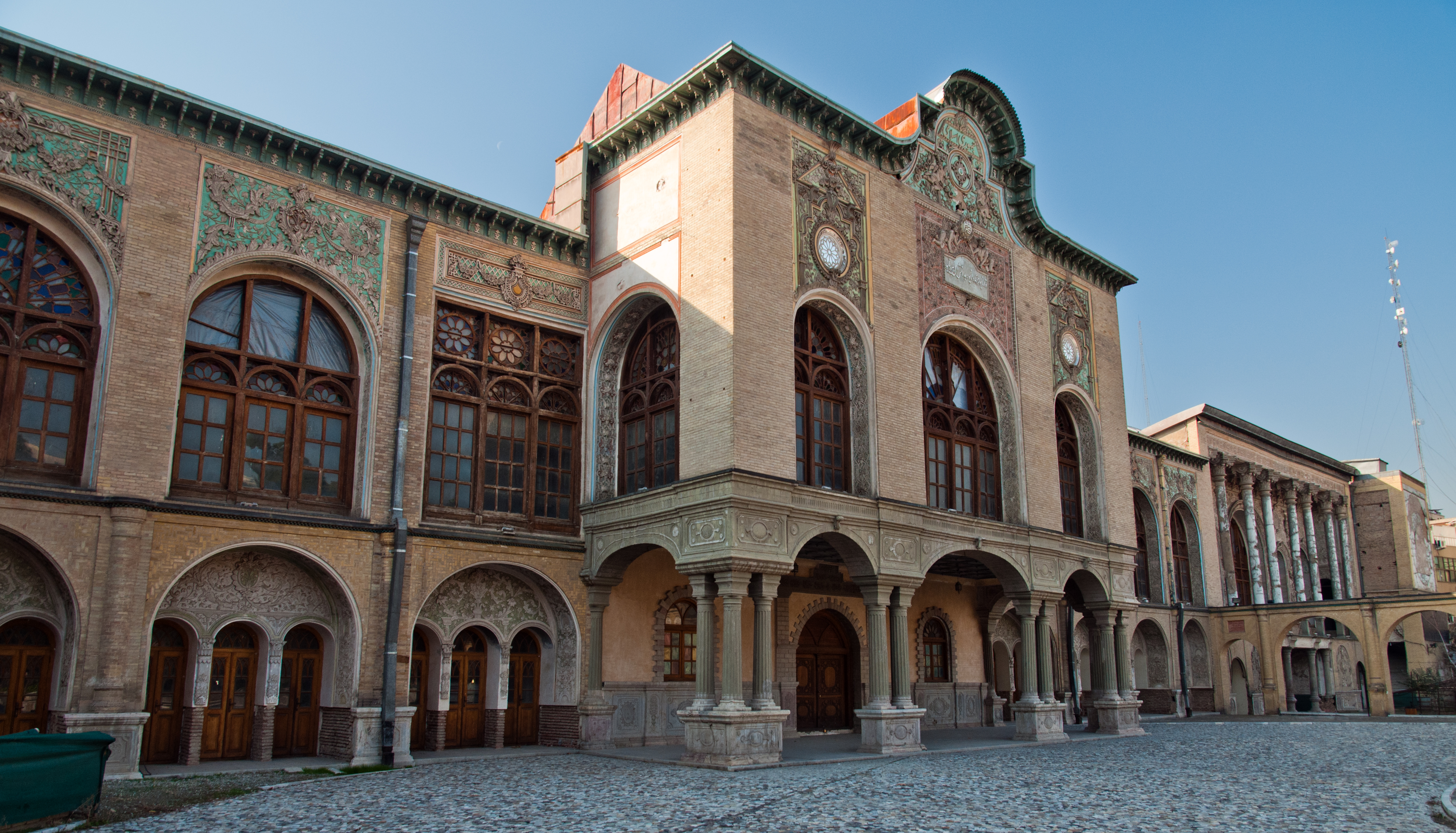

== See also ==
- Iran National Heritage List
- Baharestan Palace
- Negarestan Palace
