= Museum of Anthropology Tehran =

Museum in Tehran, Iran

Coordinates: 35.6794°N 51.4201°E

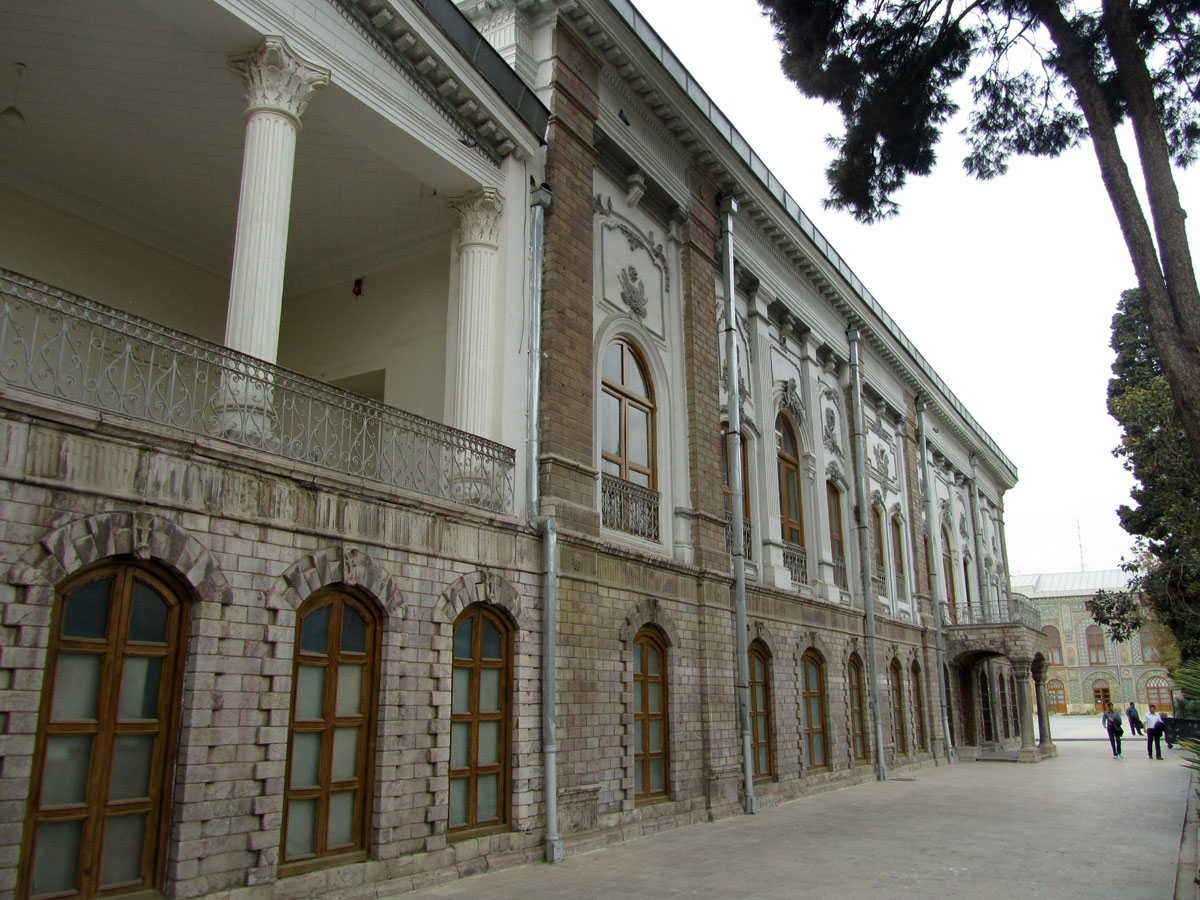

Museum of Anthropology (Persian: موزه مردم‌شناسی تهران) is a museum in Tehran, Iran. It was founded in 1935 and houses works created by people across Iran during the Qajar era and afterwards.

In 1968, the Museum of Anthropology was transferred from its former place to the Abyaz Palace in Golestan Palace. The museum has workshops for calligraphy, photography, sculpture, carpentry as well as a library with a reading room. It also has a lecture hall and forty-seven booths for works assembled from all over Iran. Relics in the museum are classified and displayed in a thematic way.

== Abyaz Palace ==
The Abyaz Palace is located in the Golestan Palace complex by Tehran's Arg Square. Completed in 1883, its was constructed by the orders of Naser al-Din Shah Qajar to exhibit gifts sent by the Ottoman sultan, Abdul Hamid II. It is an example of Baroque Revival architecture and features Louis XVI style living room decors, velvet curtains, gold and bronze statues and Turkish rugs. The external white façade of the building led to it gradually being called “Abyaz” (White).

== Gallery ==
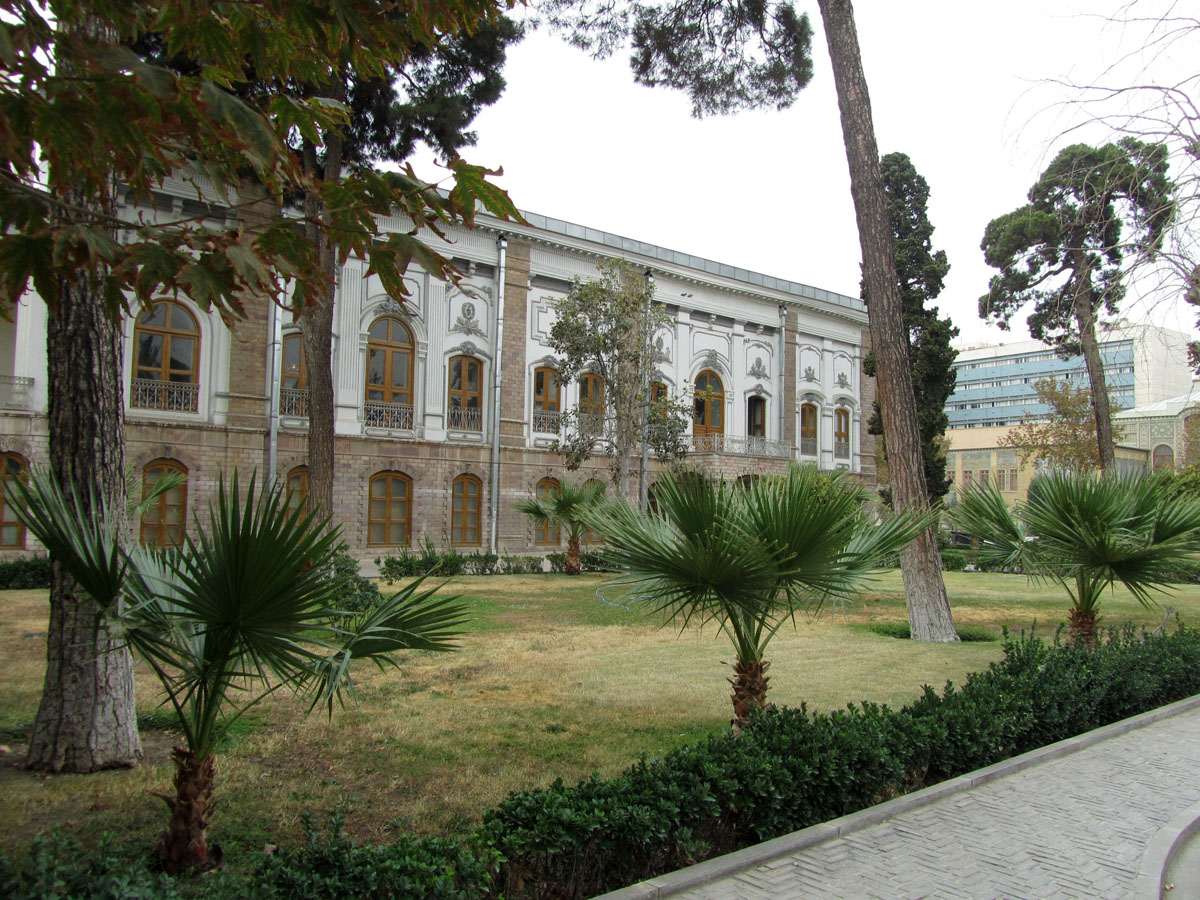
Exterior view of Abyaz Palace

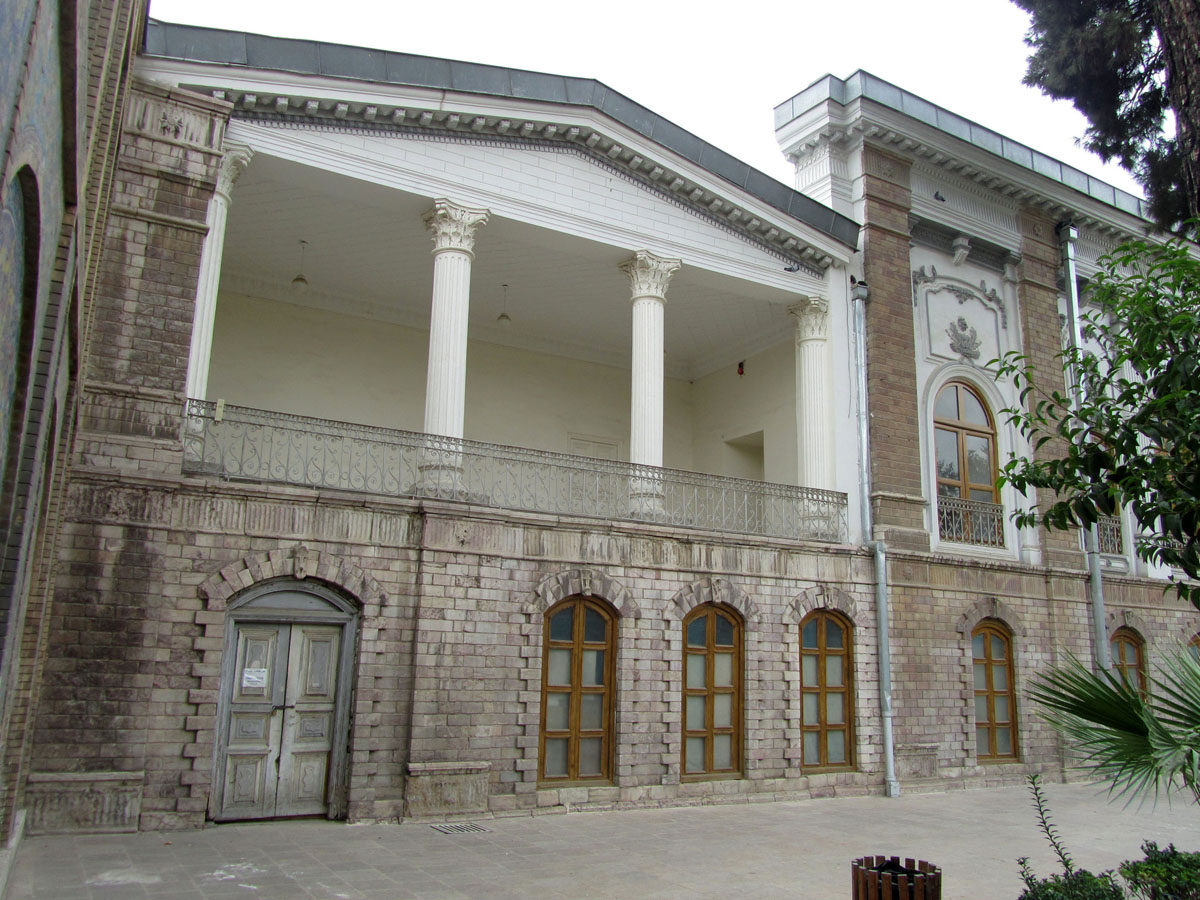
Exterior view of Abyaz Palace

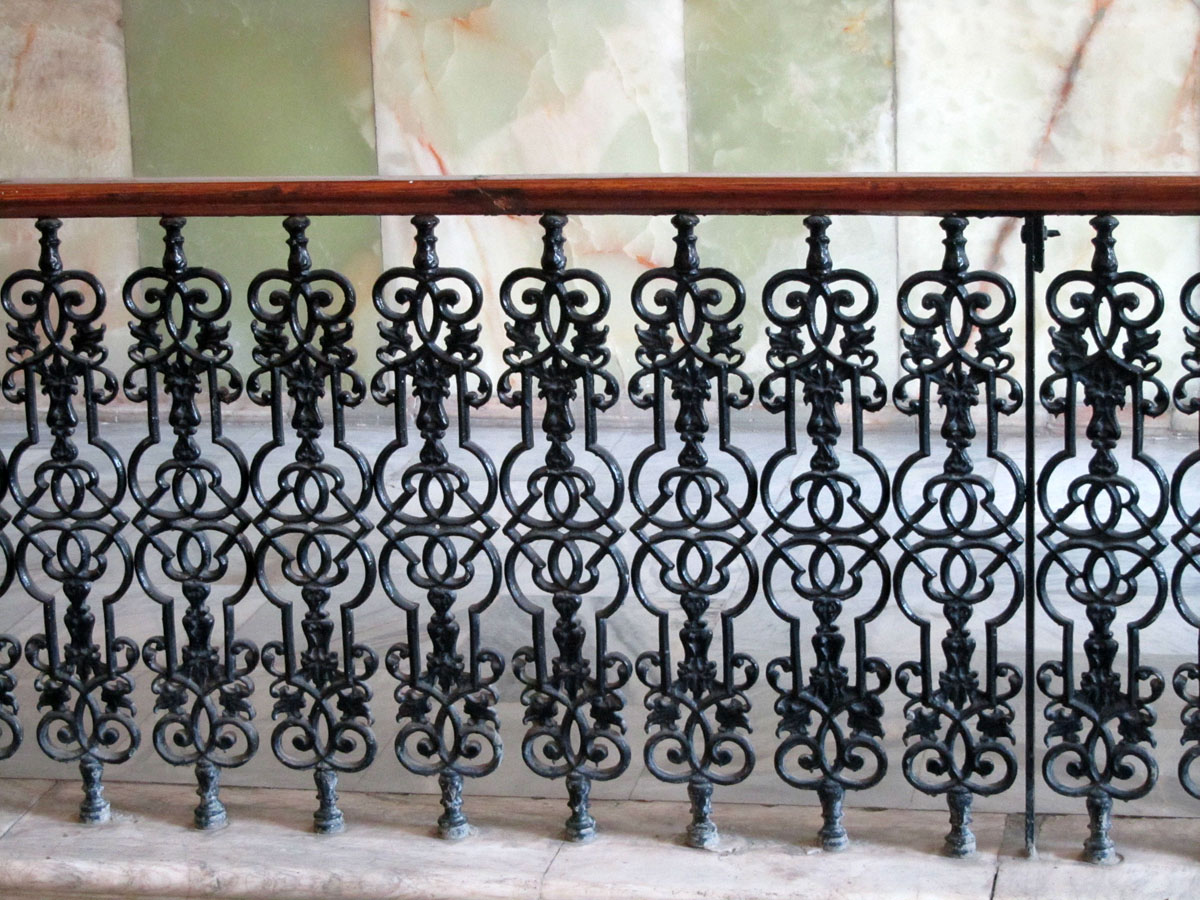
Railings at Abyaz Palace
