= Hossein-Ali Khan Moayyer ol-Mamalek =

Iranian treasurer (1798–1858)

- حسینعلی‌ خان معیرالممالک
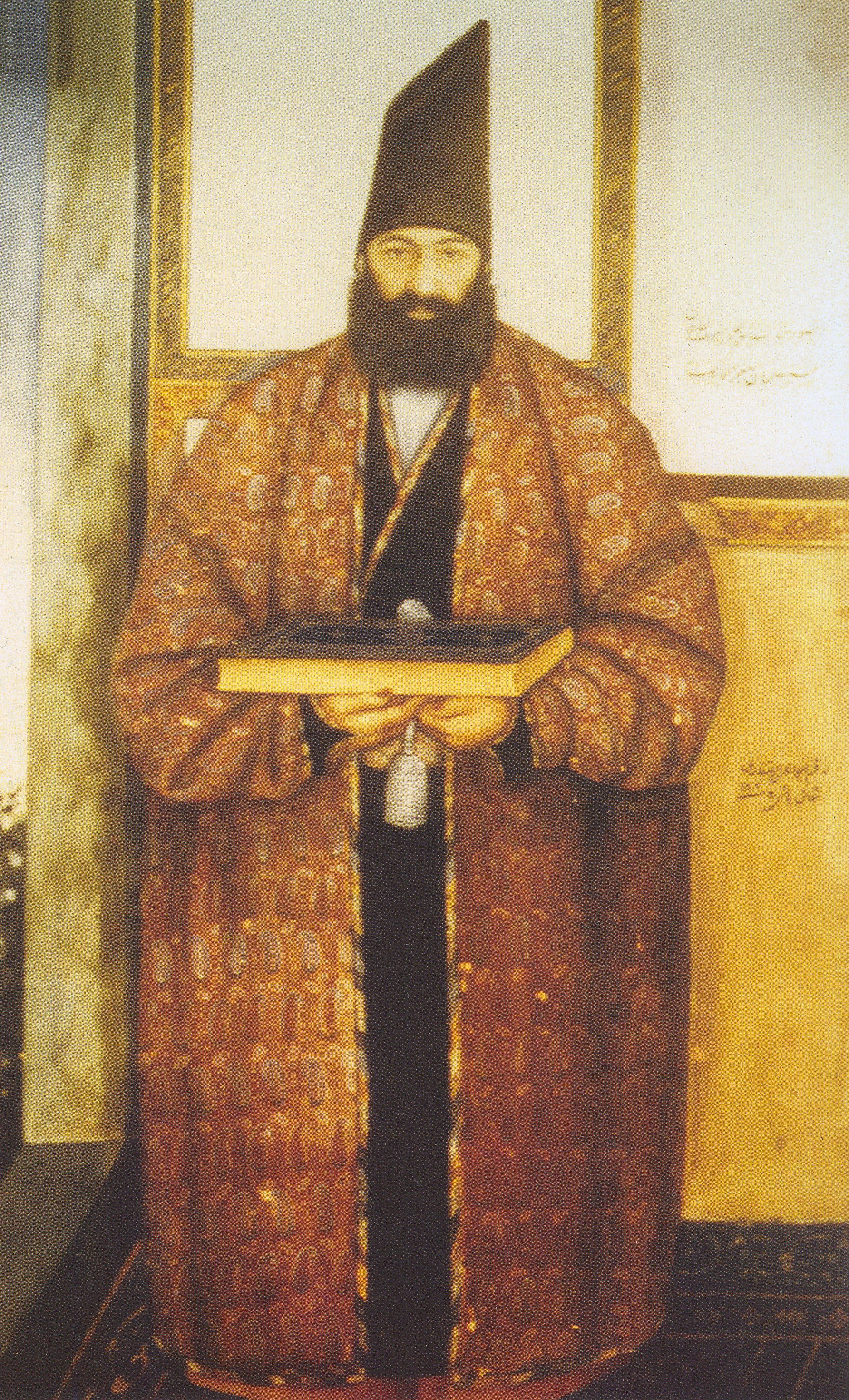
- Hossein-Ali Khan Mo'ayyer ol-Mamalek by Abu'l-Hasan Ghaffari

Personal details
- Born: 1798
- Died: 1858 (aged 59–60)
- Resting place: Karbala, Ottoman Iraq (present-day Iraq)
- Spouse: Farzaneh Begom Khanum
- Children: 3, among them; Dost Ali Khan Moayyer ol-Mamalek
- Parents: Dost Ali Khan (father); Hajjiyeh Khanom (mother)
- Occupation: Statesmen, treasurer

Hossein-Ali Khan Moayyer ol-Mamalek (Persian: حسینعلی‌خان معیرالممالک; 1798–1858), was an Iranian statesman of the Qajar era who served as Treasurer and coin assayer during the reigns of Mohammad Shah Qajar and Naser al-Din Shah Qajar.

== Family ==
His father, Dost Ali Khan Moʿayyer al-Mamālek, was treasurer under Agha Mohammad Khan Qajar and Fath-Ali Shah Qajar. His mother was named Hajjiyeh Khanom. The Moʿayeri family originated from the village of Abrasj near Bastam. Hajjiyeh Khanom was companion and close attendant of Asiye Khanum, the mother of Fath-Ali Shah Qajar.

== Life ==
In his youth, he married Farzaneh Khanom, the daughter of Fath-Ali Shah Qajar. Due to his father’s numerous services, he was exempted from paying the customary fees and gifts required for marriage to a Qajar princess. Moʿayyer al-Mamālek accompanied Mohammad Shah Qajar during First Herat War took part in campaign. During the premiership of Amir Kabir, the latter’s opposition to and distrust of Moʿayyer al-Mamālek led to his estrangement from the royal court. In addition to serving as treasurer and coin assayer, he was repeatedly appointed governor of Yazd and Rasht. Hosein-Ali Khan commissioned the construction of Ferdows Garden in Tehran. Moʿayyer al-Mamālek died in 1858 and buried in Karbala.

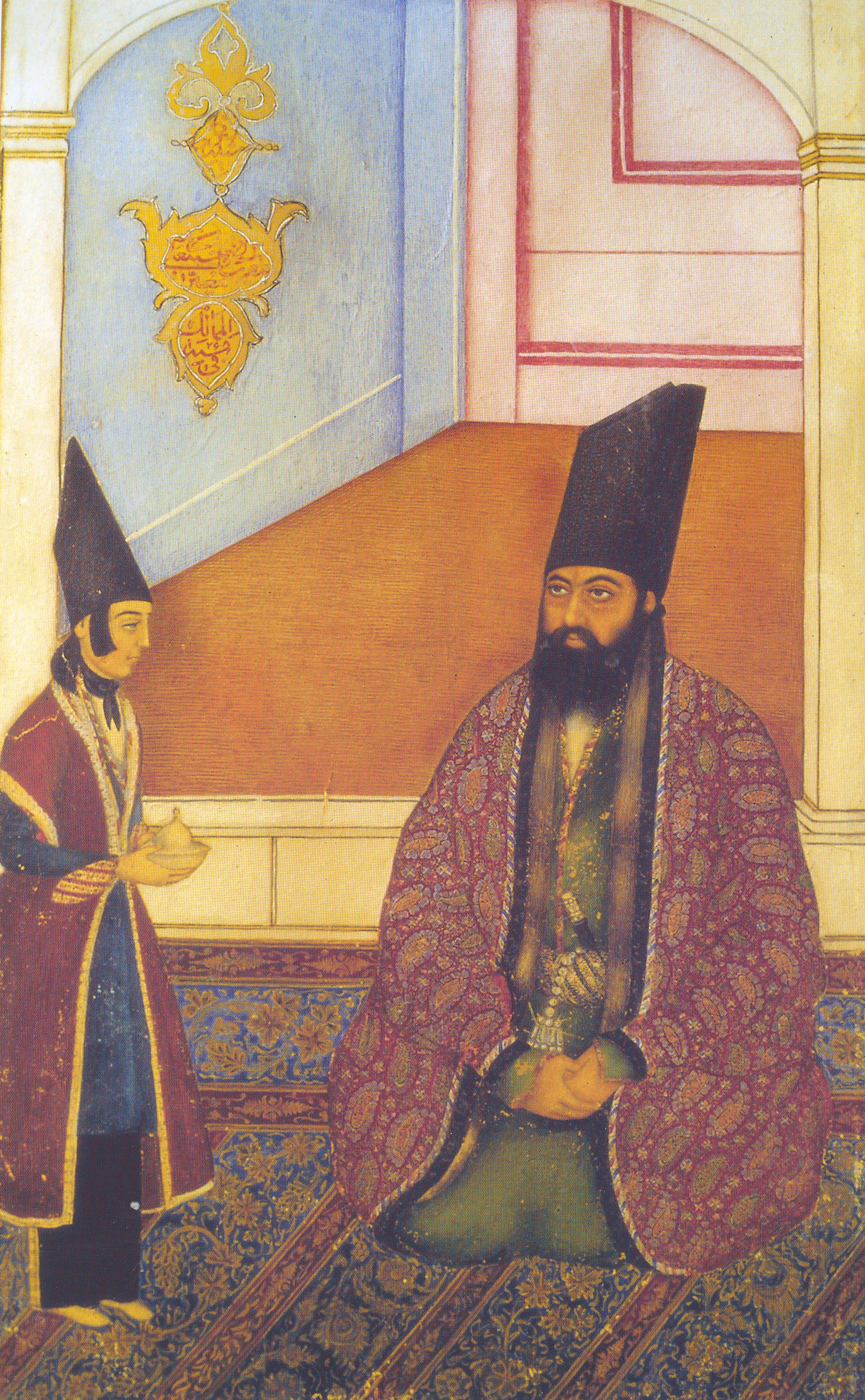
Hossein-Ali Khan and son (possibly Dost Ali Khan) by Sani ol-Molk

Hossein-Ali Khan had two daughters with Farzaneh Khanom, both of whom died in their youth, and son named Dost Ali Khan Nezam al-Dowleh.

== Sources ==
- Khavari, Mirza Fazlollah Shirazi (1845). Tarikh Zol Qarnein (تاریخ ذوالقرنین) (in Persian). Ministry of Culture and Islamic Guidance of Iran.
- Bamdad, Mehdi (1979). شرح حال رجال ایران در قرن ۱۲ و ۱۳ و ۱۴ هجری [Biographies of Iran's Elites in 1688-1979] (in Persian). Zavar.
- Azodi, Ahmad Mirza Azdo-Dowleh (1887). تاریخ عضدی [Azodi History] (in Persian). Maharat.
- E'temad os-Saltaneh, Mohammad Hasan Khan (1883–1886). Matla' al-Shams (in Persian). Tehran.
- Azod od-Dowleh, Soltan Ahmad Mirza (1975). Tarikh-e Azodi (in Persian). Tehran: Entesharat-e Babak.
- Moʿayyer al-Mamālek, Doost-Ali Khan (1983). Yāddāsht-hā-ye Zendegī-ye Khosūsī-ye Nāser al-Dīn Shāh (in Persian). Tehran: Tarikh-e Iran.
- Farahmand, Jalal. "The Moʿayyer al-Mamālek Family". Baharestan Electronic Monthly (in Persian).
- "History of Ferdows Garden". Iran Cinema Museum (in Persian). 30 September 2011.
- Diba, Layla (1998). Royal Persian Paintings : The Qajar Epoch 1785 - 1925. I.B Tauris Publishers.
