= Ferdows Garden =

Historic complex in Tehran, Iran

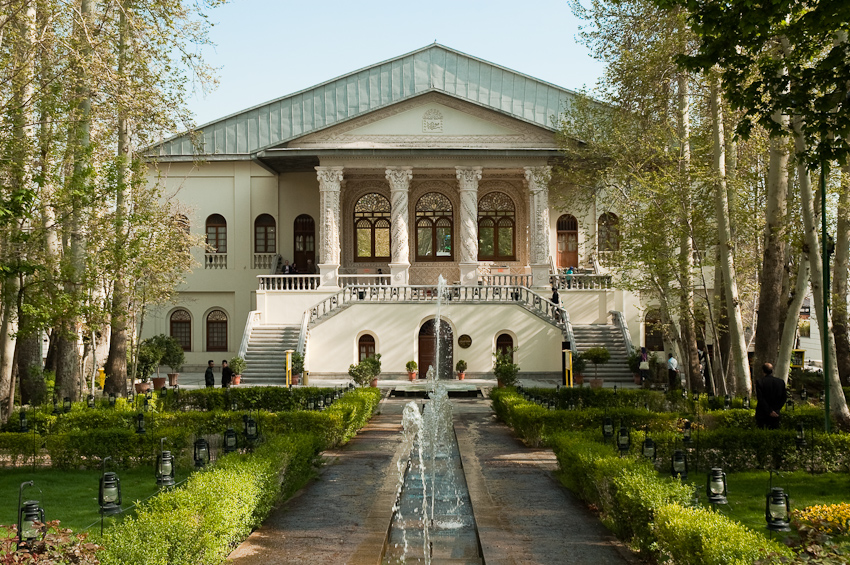
- The Cinema Museum, Ferdows Garden.
- Interactive map of Ferdows Garden
- Location: Shemiran (northern Tehran), Iran
- Coordinates: 35.7261°N 51.3086°E
- Area: 2.6 miles (4.2 km)

Ferdows Garden (Persian: باغ فردوس, romanized: Bāq-e Ferdows) is a historic complex located in the district of Tajrish in Shemiran (northern Tehran), Iran.

The complex dates back to the Qajar era, and includes a mansion which houses the Cinema Museum of Iran since 2002.

== Etymology ==
By the Achaemenid era, the term pairidaēza (Avestan) referred to the extensive gardens built all over the empire. It derived from the Proto-Iranian paridaiźa, literally meaning "circular boundary". Modern Persian ferdows (فردوس) and pardis (پردیس) are derivatives of the same word, which occurred in Greek as parádeisos (παράδεισος) and entered English as paradise.

According to the Oxford English Dictionary, as well as the Dehkhoda Dictionary, this word entered Hebrew as pardēs (Hebrew: פַּרְדֵּס), following the arrival of the Jews in Babylon in the 5th century BC. In the sections of the Old Testament that predate this arrival, the notions of "heaven" and "hell" are not specific; only later has pārdēs, originally meaning "garden" and "orchard", been endowed with the spiritual meaning that is signified by this word.

Dehkhoda notes that pardēs has been used as a synonym for the Hebrew word gān, meaning "the Garden of Eden". He also states that the word firdaws, used twice in the Quran, has its root in Judaism and Christianity.

== History ==
The origin of complex dates back to the reign of Mohammad Shah Qajar (1808–1848) who ordered the construction of a mansion named Mohammadieh (محمدیه) in Tajrish. He died on 5 September 1848, and the unfinished structure was subsequently disused.

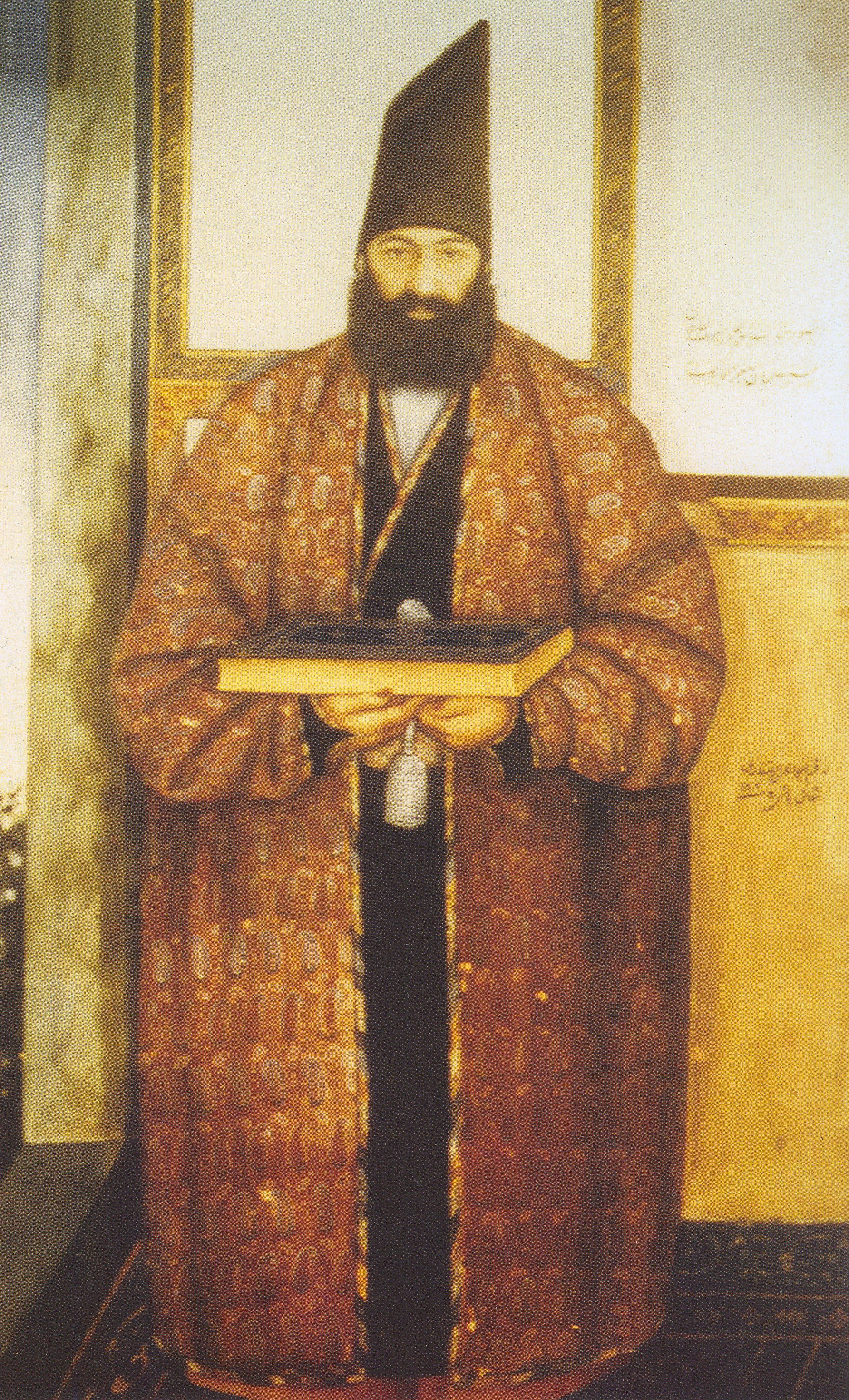
Hossein-Ali Khan

Later on, Hossein-Ali Khan Moayyer ol-Mamalek, a courtier close to Mohammad Shah, followed up the construction of a two-floor Qajaresque Neo-Baroque mansion within the same area. During the reign of Naser ed-Din Shah Qajar (1848–1896), the ownership of the enclosure was transferred to Dust-Ali Khan (Nezam od-Dowleh), the son of Hossein Ali Khan. He refurbished the complex and renamed it Ferdows. Afterwards, Dust-Mohammad Khan, the son of Dust-Ali Khan and the son-in-law of Naser ed-Din Shah, built a new mansion to the south of the enclosure. He used the workmanship of architects from Isfahan and Yazd, and named it Rašk-e Behešt, meaning "the Envy of Heaven".

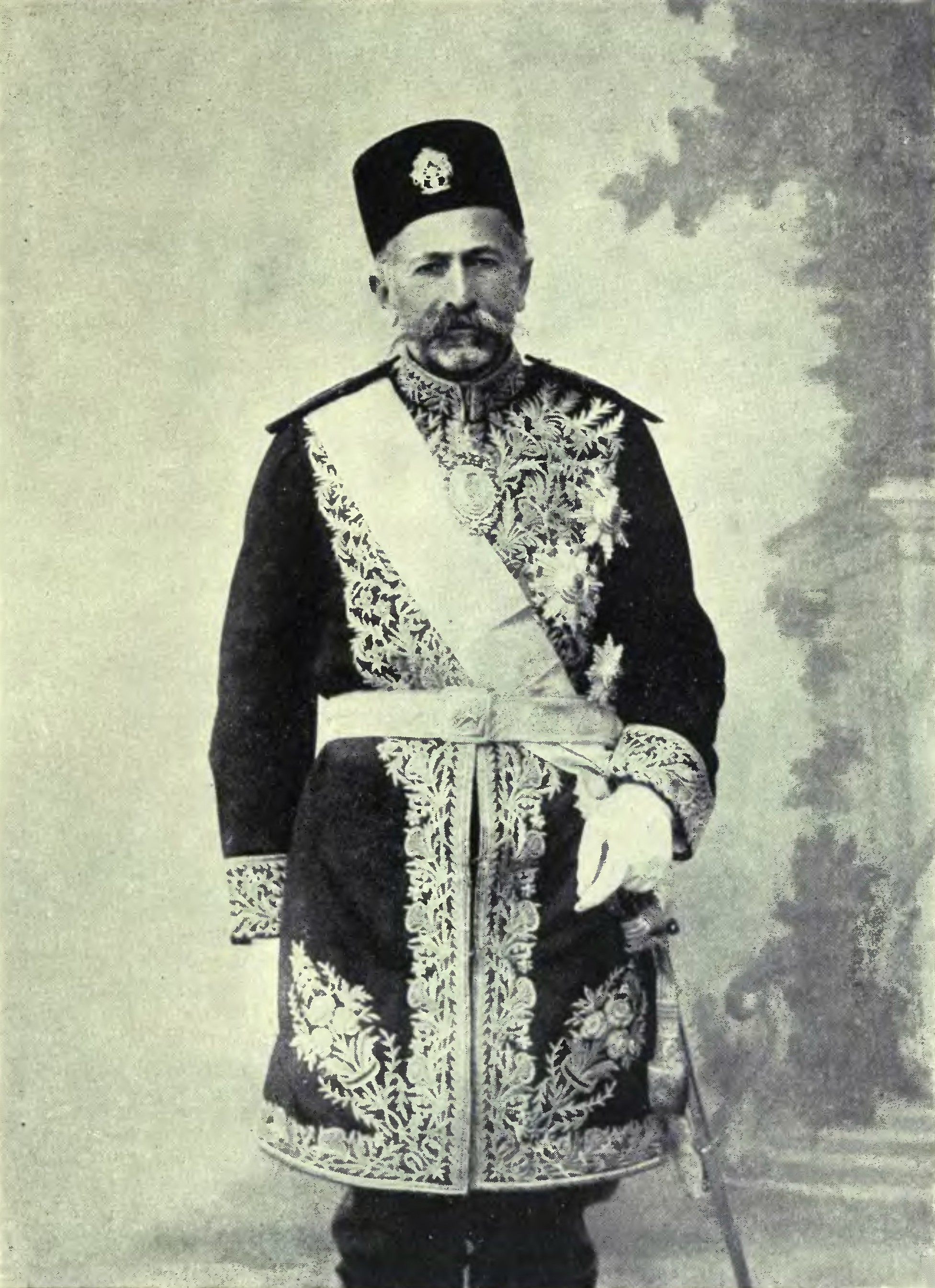
Mohammad-Vali Khan, Sepahsalar-e Tonekaboni

The complex changed several hands, and the older mansion was eventually destroyed. The remaining structure was then bought by Mohammad Vali Khan Tonekaboni, who was the leader of the Constitutionalist Revolutionary Forces from Iran's northern regions of Gilan and Mazandaran.

After the 1979 Iranian Revolution, until 2002, Ferdows Garden served as a training center for filmmaking.

== In Iranian cinema ==
Ferdows Garden, 5 o'Clock in the Afternoon (2005), an Iranian film written, produced, and directed by Siamak Shayeghi, with Reza Kianian, Ladan Mostofi, and Azita Hajian in the principal roles, refers to the public park from where the main mansion is in view.

== Gallery ==
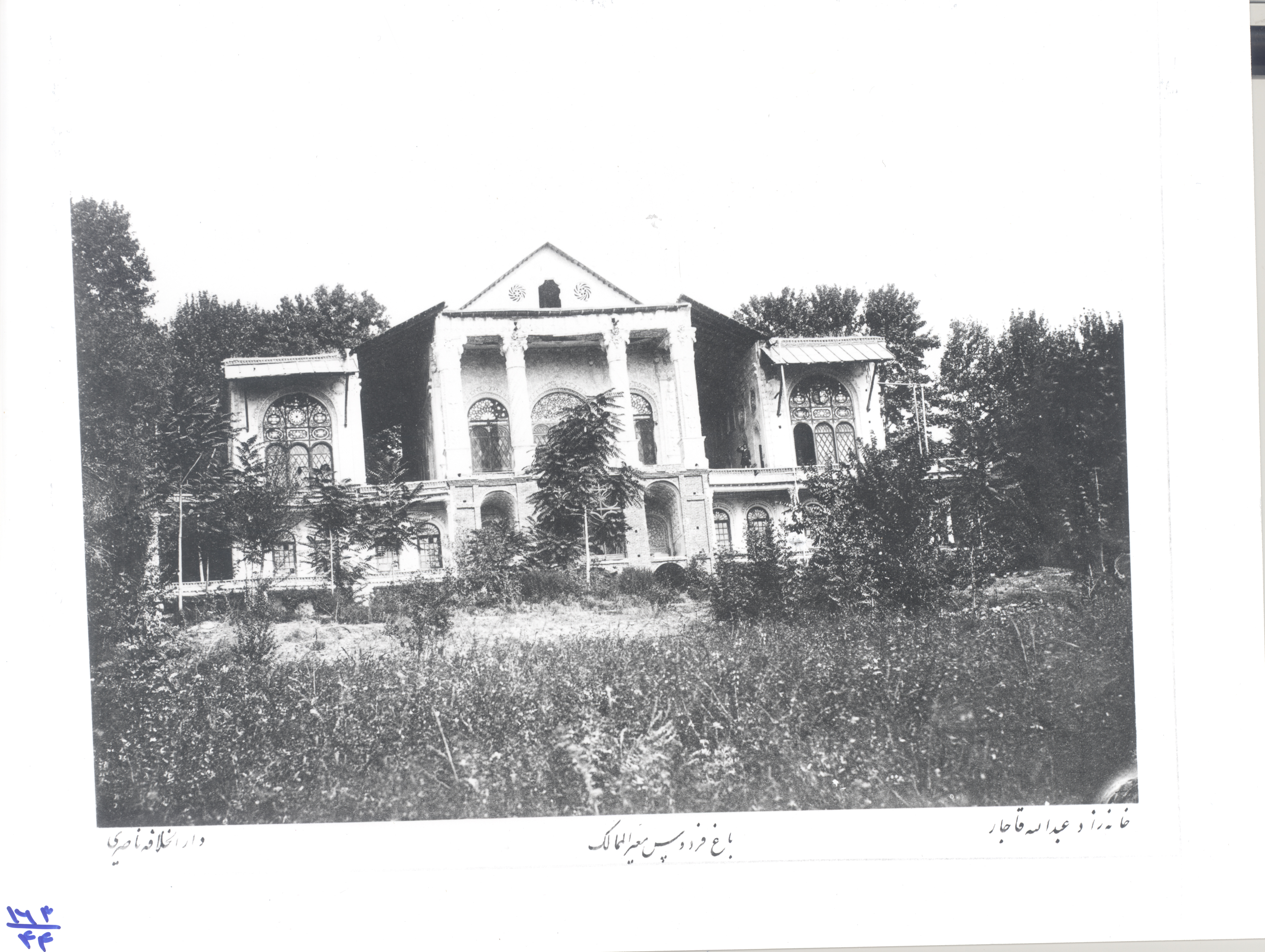
Photograph of Ferdows Mansion by Abdullah Mirza Qajar

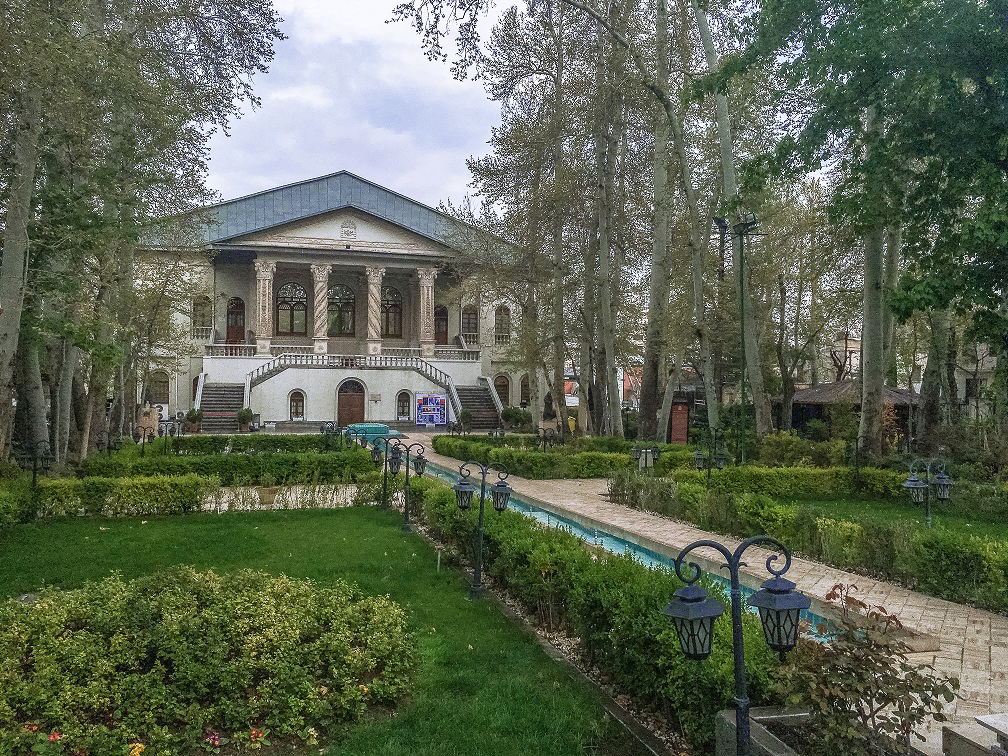
Exterior view of the mansion

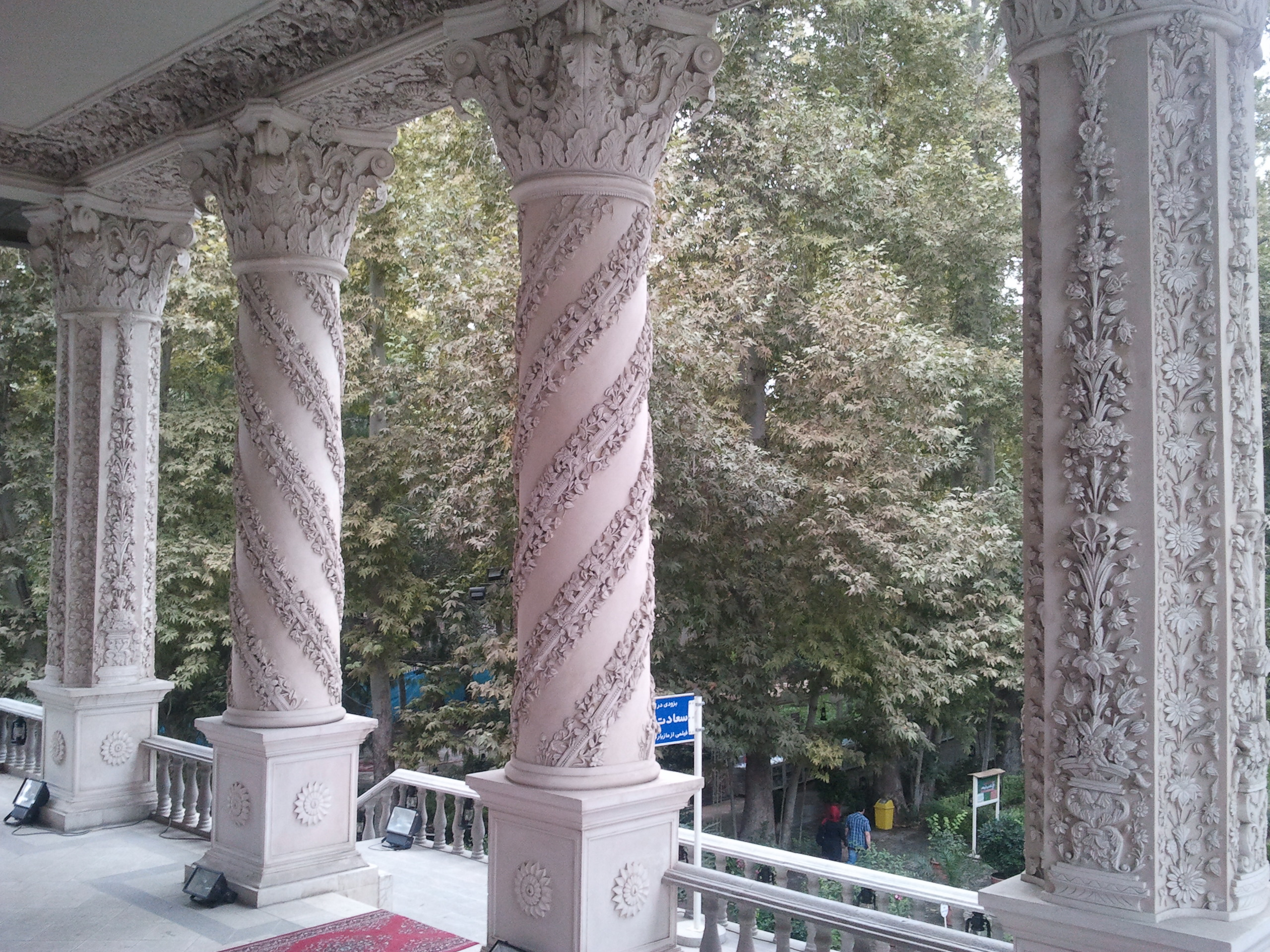
Ferdows Garden

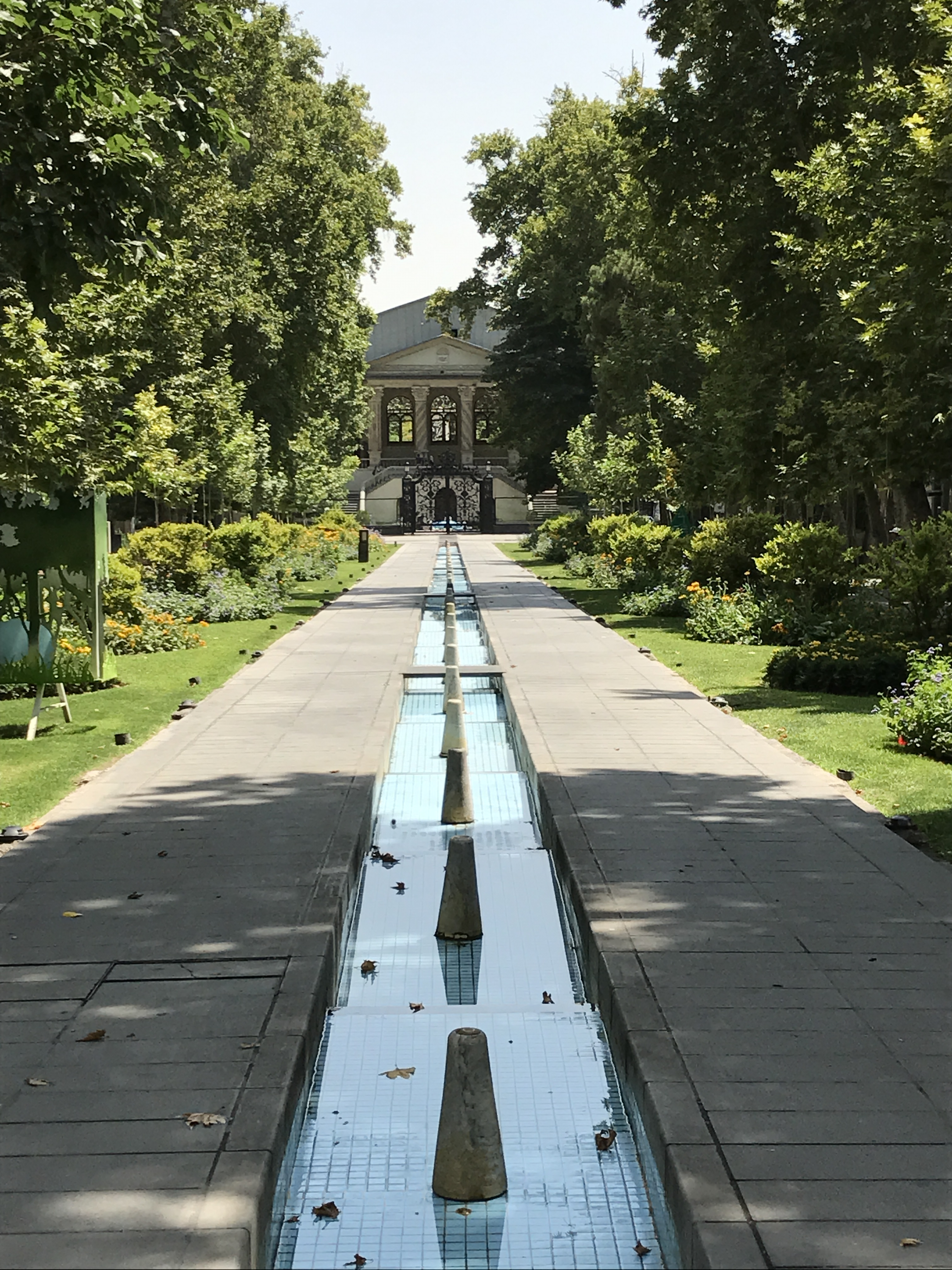
Path leading to the mansion

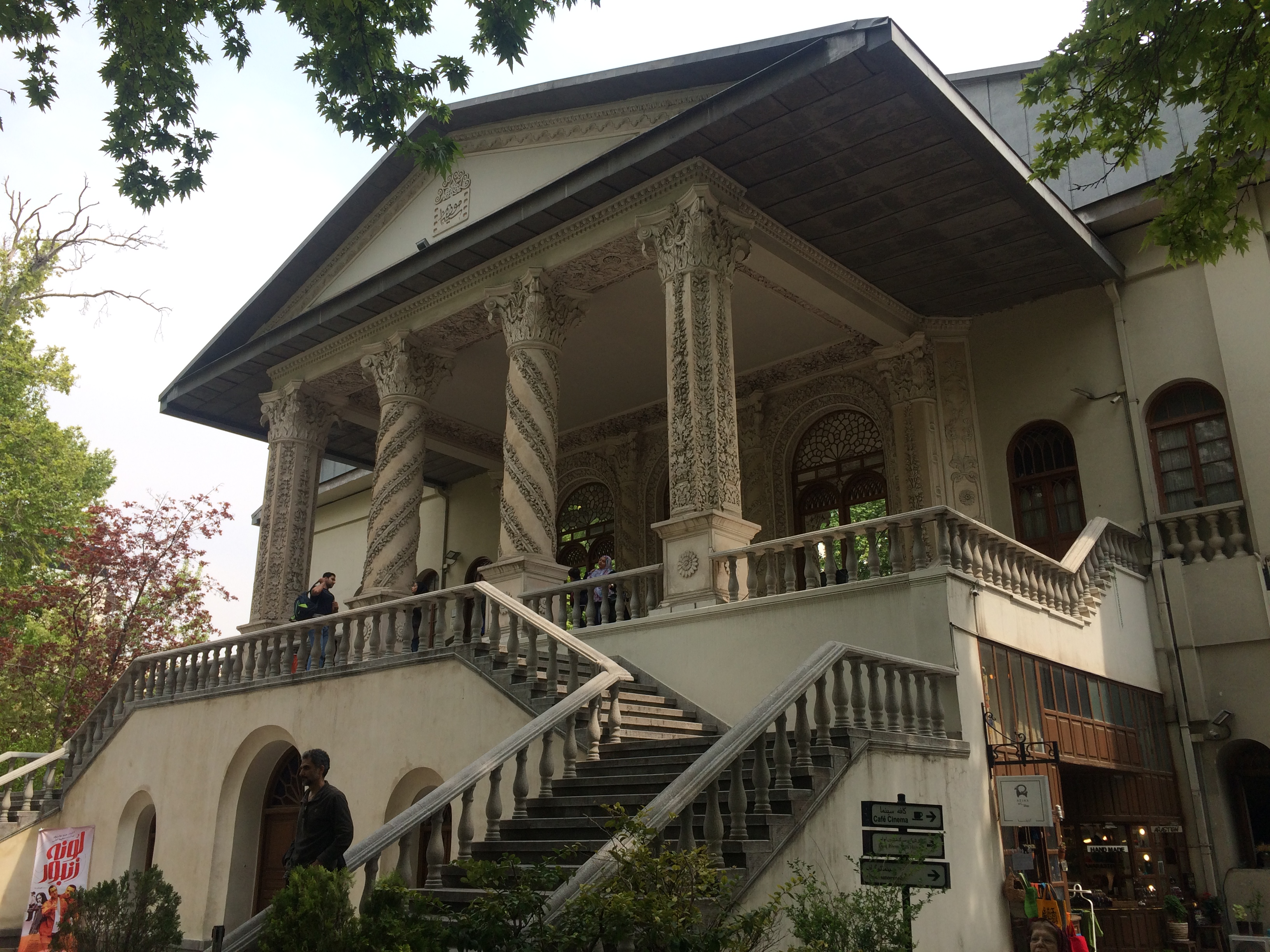
Entrance

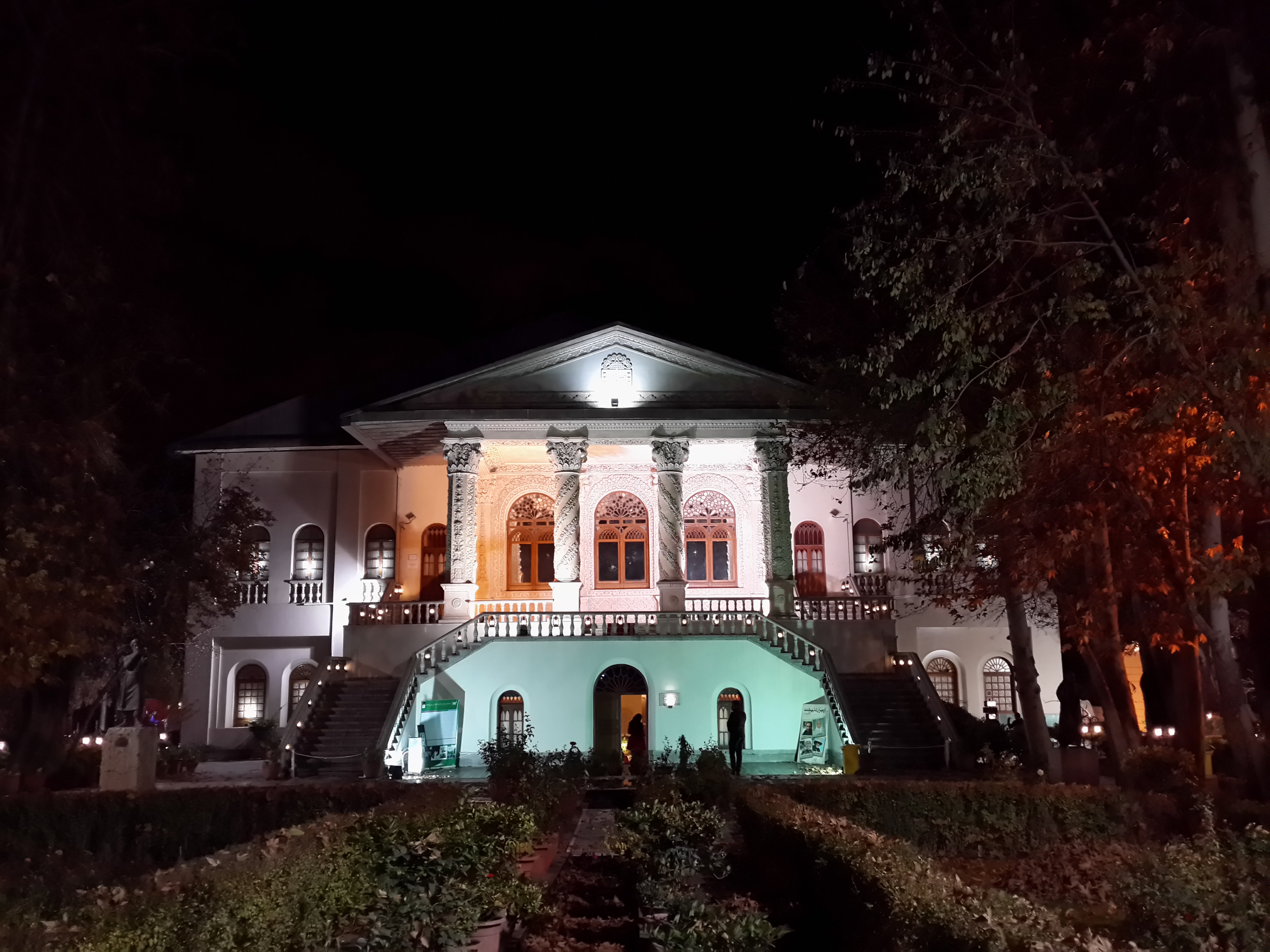
At night

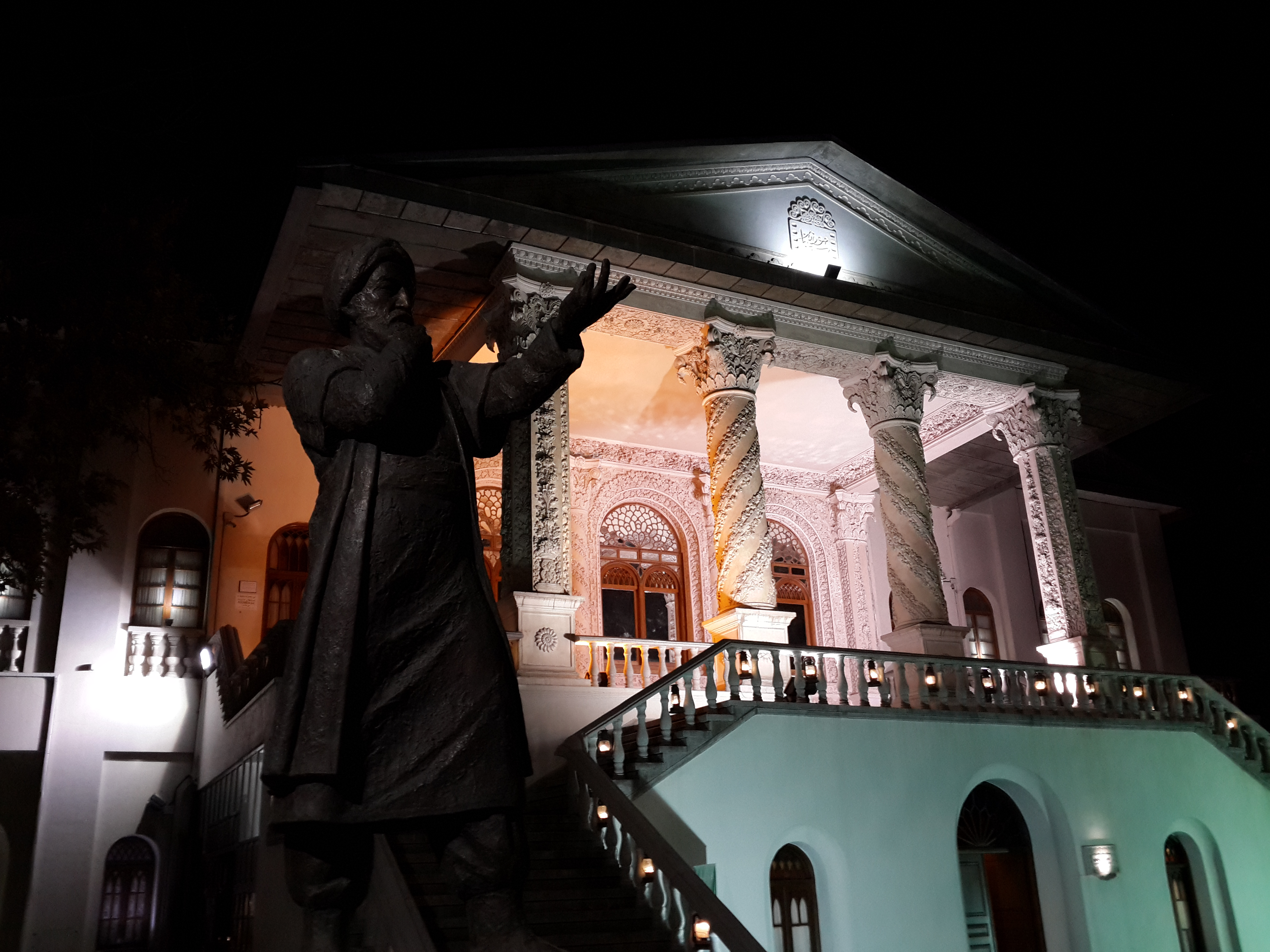
At night

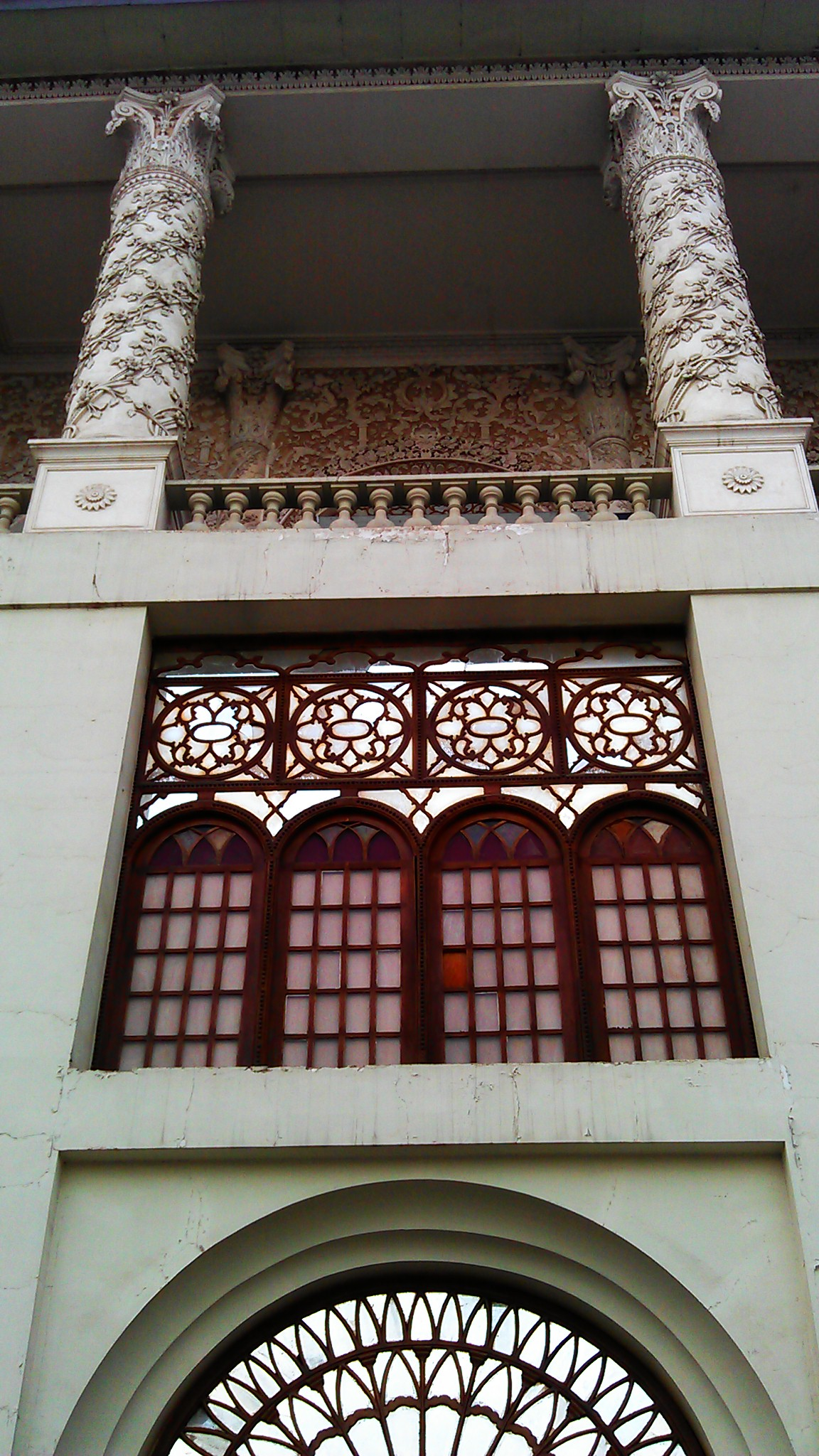
Entrance

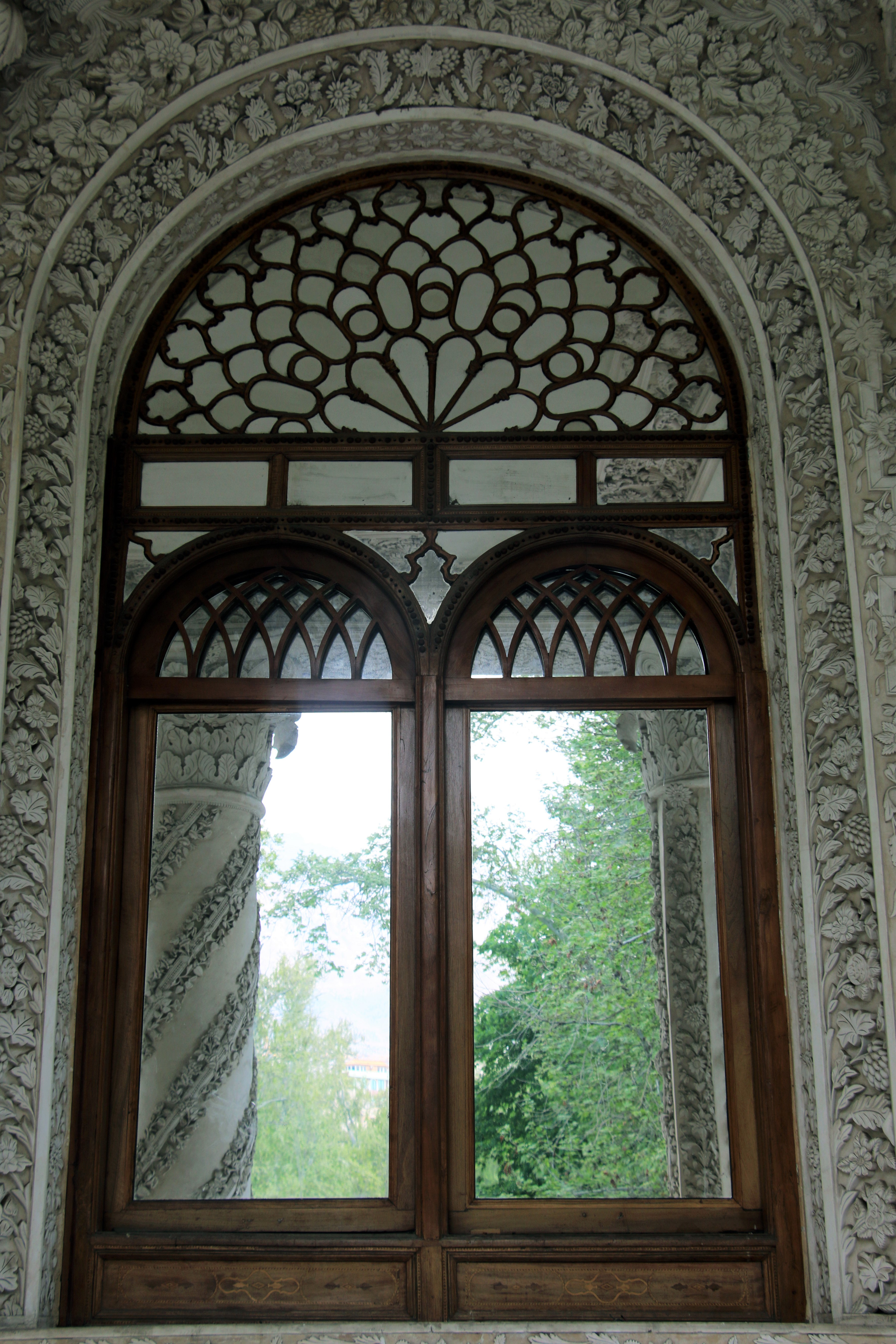

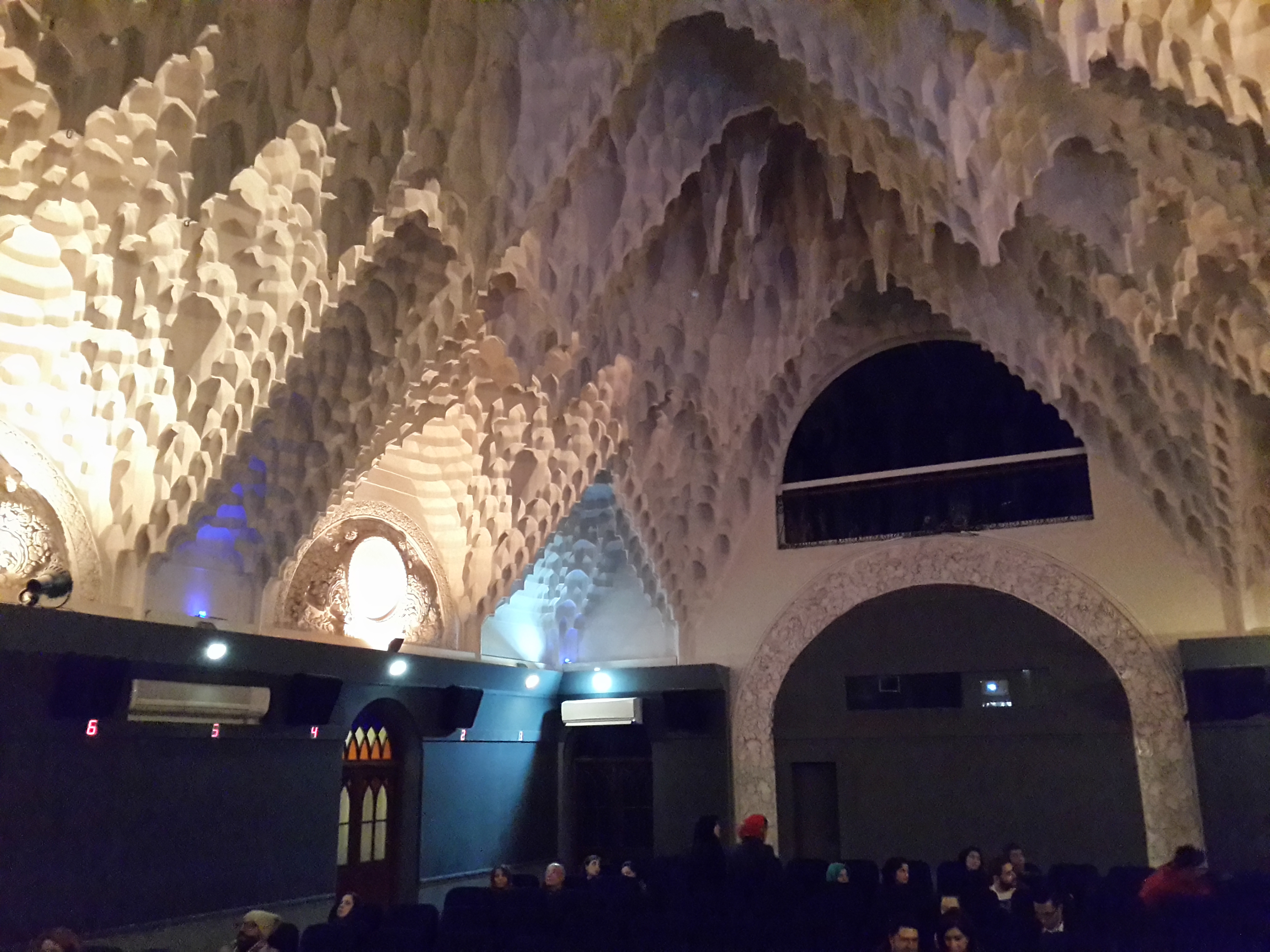
An interior view

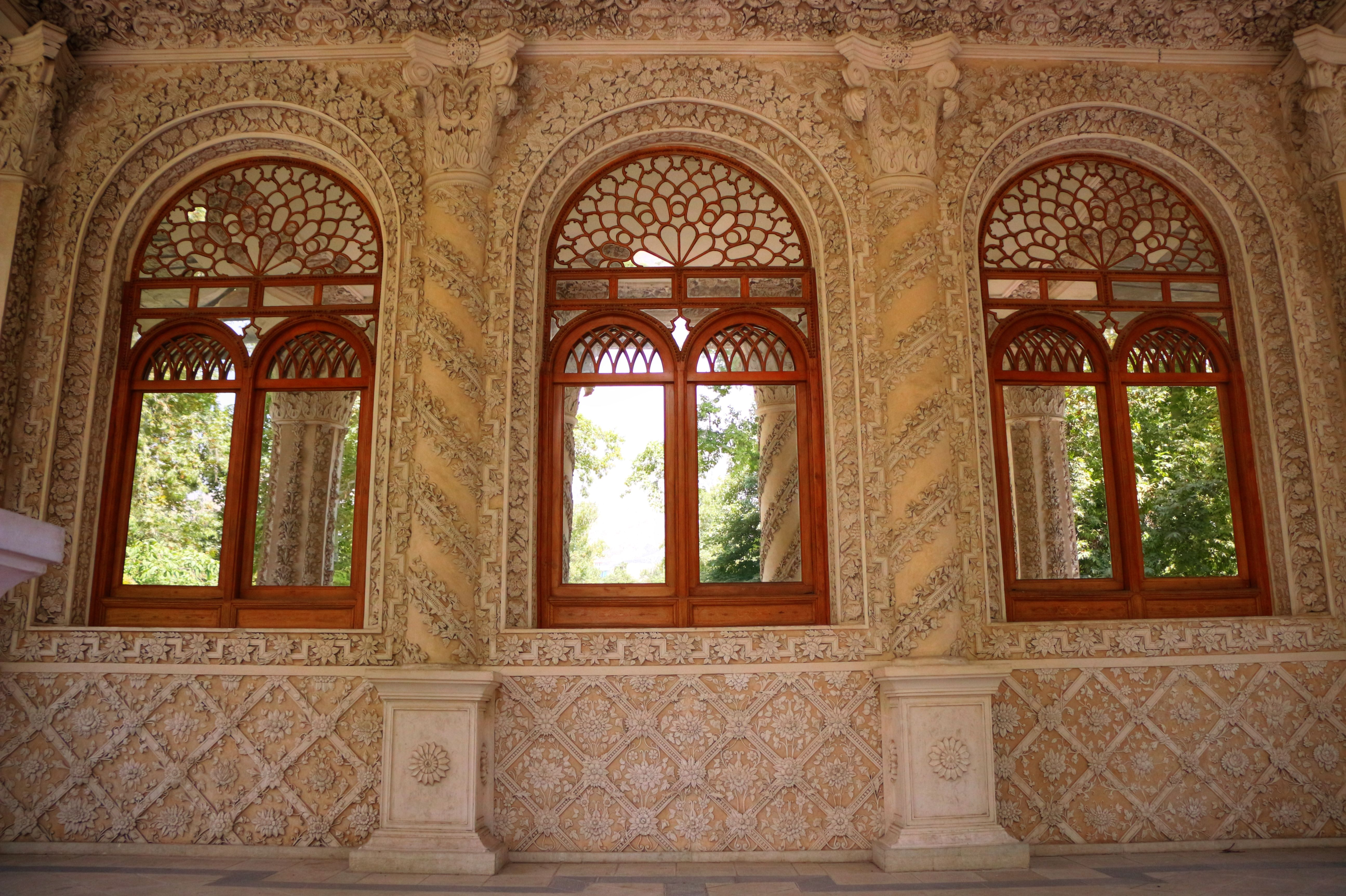
A view through the window

== See also ==
- Persian gardens
- Paradise garden
- Bagh (garden)
- Cinema of Iran
