= Siamak Shayeghi =

Iranian film director (1954–2020)

- سیامک شایقی
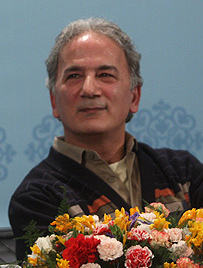
- Born: August 11, 1954; Abadan, Iran
- Died: April 15, 2020 (aged 65)
- Occupations: Film director; Screenwriter; Critic

Siamak Shayeghi (Persian: سیامک شایقی; 11 August 1954 – 15 April 2020) was an Iranian film director and film producer.

Born in Abadan, he graduated in Cinema and Television and started his career as film critic and was assistant director in the mid-1980s. In 1990 and 1991 he worked together with the famous Iranian opera singer and film actor Hossein Sarshar.

== Filmography ==
- A Dowry for Robab, 1987
- Star and Diamond, 1988
- Renault - Tehran 29, 1990
- Rah o birah, 1991
- Maze, 1992
- In Cold Blood, 1994
- My Mother Gissou, 1995
- Sharareh, 1999
- Bāgh-e Ferdows, 5 O'clock in the afternoon, 2005
- Khab e Zemestani, 2008
