= Dost Ali Khan Moayyer ol-Mamalek =

Qajar statesmen (died 1873)

Nezam od-Dowleh Dost Ali Khan Moayyer ol-Mamalek
- دوستعلی ‌خان معیرالممالک
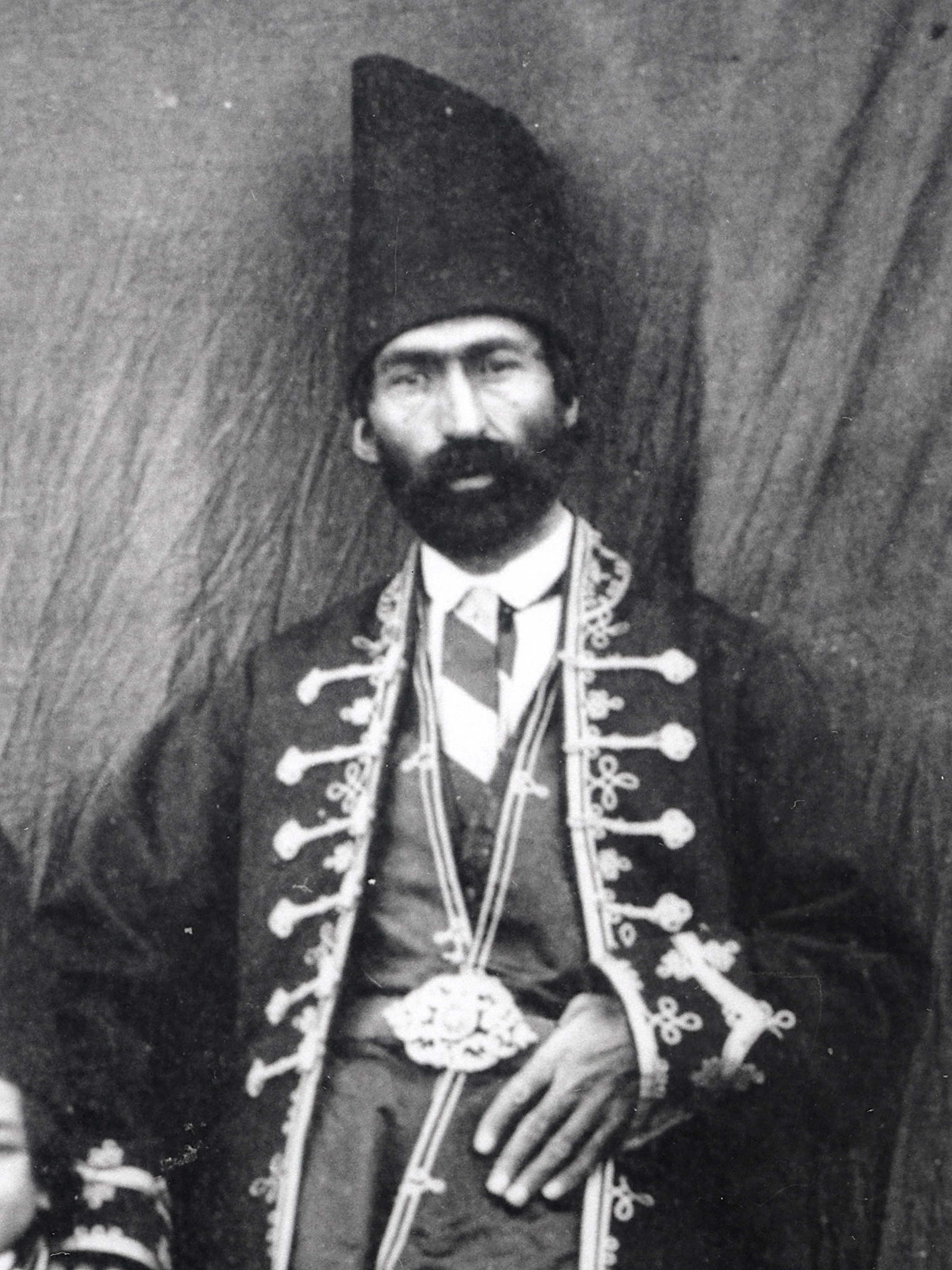
- Photograph of Moayyer ol-Mamalek taken by Aqa Reza Akasbashi, 1863–1864, Golestan Palace Library

Personal details
- Born: 1819
- Died: 1873 (aged 53–54) Qajar Iran
- Parents: Hossein-Ali Khan Moayyer ol-Mamalek (father); Farzana Khanum (mother)
- Family: Moayyer; Qajar

Dost Ali Khan Moayyer ol-Mamalek (Persian: دوستعلی ‌خان معیرالممالک; died 1873) was an Statesman, public figure and art collector of Qajar Iran.

== Biography ==
Dost Ali Khan, son of Hoseyn Ali Khan Moayyer ol-Mamalek (died 1857) and scion of a family of court statesmen prominent since the Afsharid era, held numerous lucrative posts under both Mohammad Shah Qajar and his successor Naser al-Din Shah Qajar. His father, Hoseyn Ali Khan, was the first of three members of family to bear the title Moayyer ol-Mamalek. He was the first to accumulate family's wealth while also cultivating its interest in the arts, which became a defining characteristic of the family over the following three generations. His mother, Farzana Khanum, was the thirty-ninth daughter of Fath-Ali Shah Qajar.

Dost Ali Khan was appointed to numerous court offices, including the position of superintendent of the royal buildings, culminating in his appointment as Assayer of the State (Moayyer ol-Mamalek) in 1866–1867. He inherited his interest in the arts from his father. Dost Ali Khan was one of the foremost patrons of art and architecture of his time. As befitted a statesman of his rank, he commissioned both residential and religious buildings and assembled a notable personal library. His pride in these achievements is reflected in a watercolor portrait, now held in the Louvre, depicting him standing against a landscape with his residence in Shemiran, the Ferdows Garden, visible in the distance.

A more cynical observer of Qajar society; Louis-Victor-Léon de Rochechouart remarked in his memoirs that Dost Ali Khan collected erotic European paintings depicting Venus to decorate one of his reception rooms. Among his other achievements as superintendent of the shah's buildings was overseeing the construction for Naser al-Din Shah of two of the era's most celebrated architectural projects: the Shams ol-Emareh Palace completed in 1865–1866 and the Takyeh Dowlat theatre, both located within the Golestan Palace complex. Dost Ali Khan also endowed a Madrasa in Tehran where the prominent theologian Hajj Molla Mohammad Tehrani studied. In addition, he was appointed commissioner for the Iranian state's participation in the 1867 Exposition Universelle in Paris. The exposition served as an international forum for promoting the decorative and applied arts of non-Western countries, and the appointment carried both considerable responsibility and significant prestige.

According to Samuel Benjamin; Dost Ali Khan was a collector of drawings, calligraphy, engravings, and manuscripts, and assembled one of the largest libraries in the region. His influence also extended directly to the shah's inner circle, as Qajar sources note that Naser al-Din Shah's physician, Mirza Seyyed Ali Moayyer, had formerly been his protégé. Dost Ali Khan's father had supervised the production of the six-volume One Thousand and One Nights, the most ambitious manuscript project of the late Qajar era, illustrated by Abu'l-Hasan Sani al-Mulk and his pupils. Dost Ali Khan assumed responsibility for the project and is credited with completing it in 1852–1853, four years before his father's death. Dost Ali Khan's death in 1873 marked the beginning decline of the political significance of the Moayyer family.

== Dust Ali Khan Mu'ayyir (portrait) ==
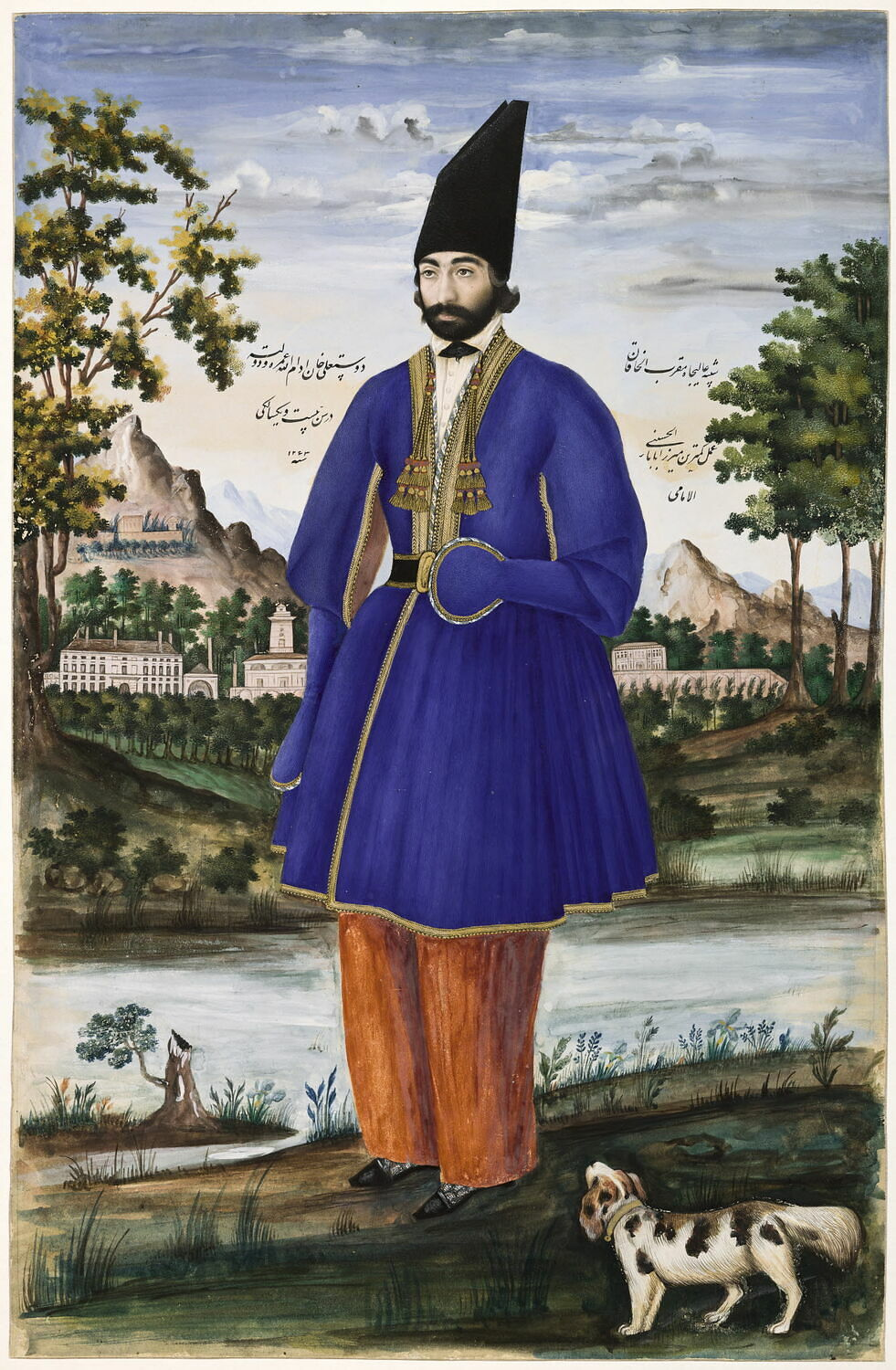
Dust Ali Khan Mu'ayyir, signed by Mirza Baba al-Husayni al-Imami, 1846–1847, Louvre

Dated two years before Mohammad Shah's death, this watercolor exemplifies the increased interaction between Persian and European painting in the 1840s. No longer presenting an idealized image, as was common during the previous reign, this painting was intended to provide a faithful depiction of an individual. The inscription on either side of the figure identifies the subject as Dost Ali Khan (1819–1873), Mu’ayyir al-Mamalik (Assayer of the Realm). The text not only gives the artist's name and the date, but also specifies his age as twenty-one.

== Sources ==
- Diba, Layla (1998). Royal Persian Paintings : The Qajar Epoch 1785 - 1925. I.B Tauris Publishers.
- Diba, Layla S. (2002). Dust-AIi Moayyer's Painters of the Naseri and Mozaffari Period: A Little Known Document for the Study of Artists and Patrons of the Qajar Period. Costa Mesa, California: Mazda Publishers. ISBN 1-56859-138-1.
