= Shams-ol-Emareh =

19th-century palace building in Tehran, Iran

Coordinates: 35.6790°N 51.4221°E

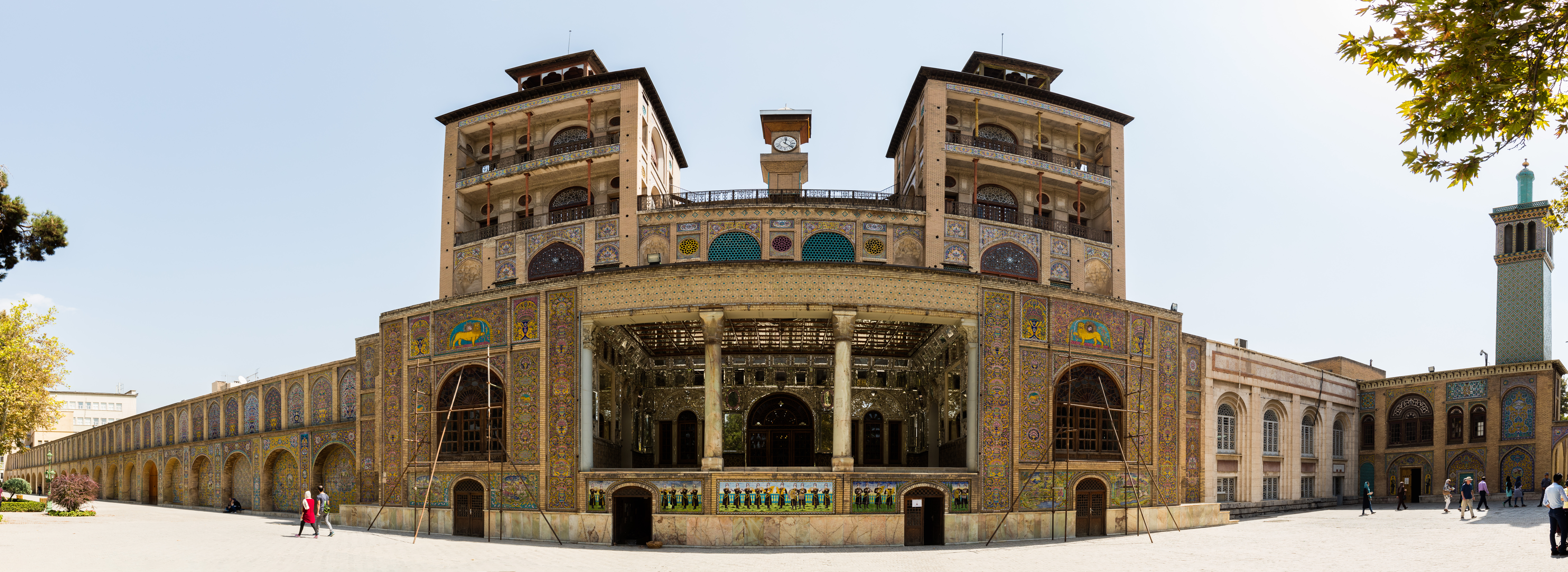
- Shams-ol-Emareh in 2016
- Interactive map of the Shams-ol-Emareh area

General information
- Architectural style: Iranian
- Location: Tehran, Iran
- Year built: 1865–1867

Height
- Height: 35 metres (115 ft)

Shams-ol-Emareh (Persian: شمس‌العماره, lit. 'Edifice of the Sun') is one of Tehran’s historic buildings and a remnant of Qajar Iran. It is one of the most prominent buildings on the east side of Golestan Palace. It was built in 1865–1867 and is notable for its height, decorations and design.

Shams-ol-Emareh is 35 meters tall with five floors. It was the tallest building in Tehran when it was built, and the first building that used metal in its structure. All the pillars in the upper floors are of cast iron. Shams-ol-Emareh was the symbol of Tehran before the National Garden gate was built.

== History ==
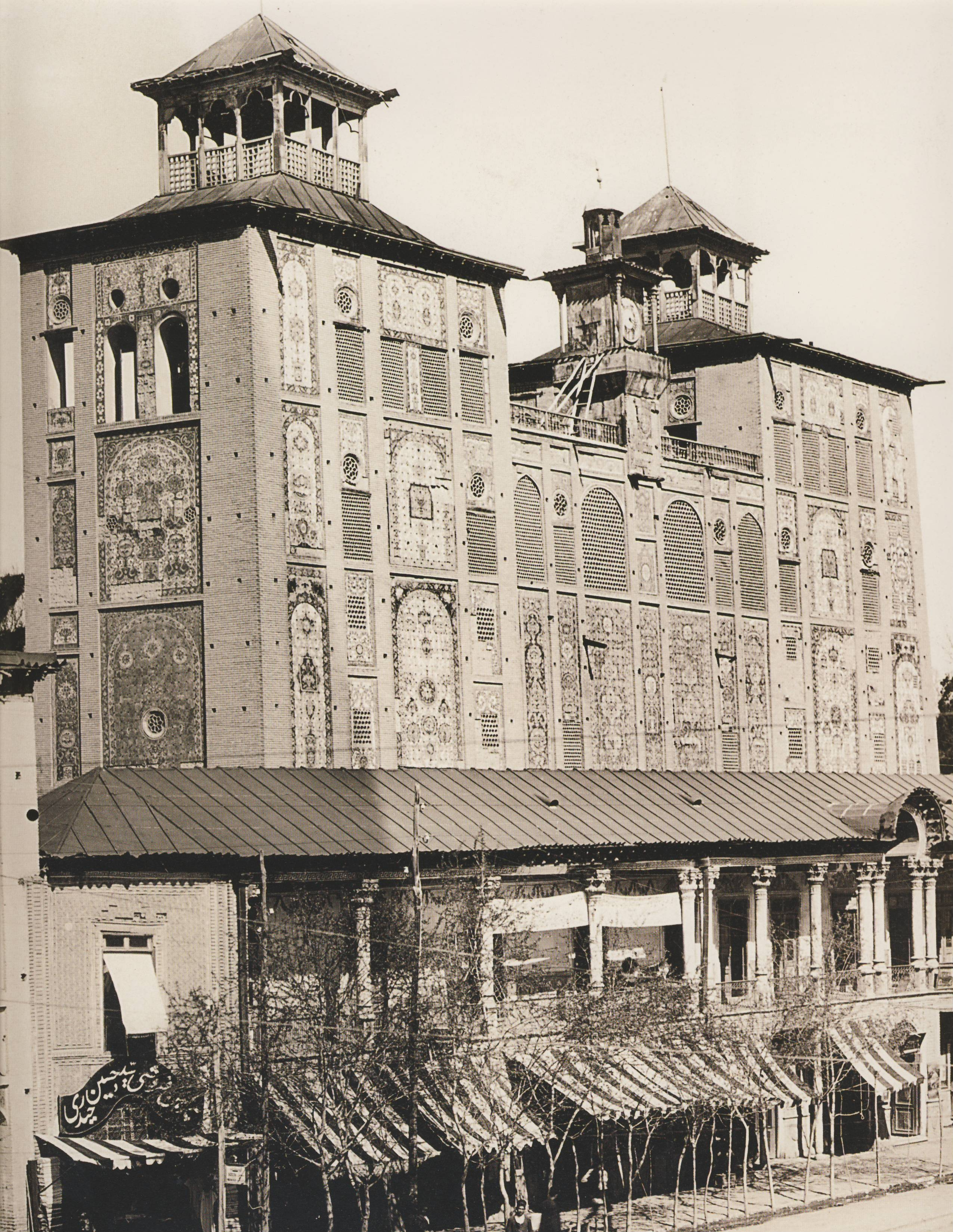
Old photograph of Shams-ol-Emareh

Before his visit to Europe, Naser al-Din Shah Qajar, the fourth shah of the Qajar dynasty, had considered building a mansion in his capital to compete with Isfahan’s Ālī Qāpū. A tall building that he could stand on its roof and see the entire Tehran. By his order, construction on the Shams-ol-Emareh was started in 1865 and was finished in two years. Naser al-Din Shah took his guests to the roof of this building to see the capital. The building’s designer was Moayer al Mamalek and the architect was Ali Mohammed Kashi. The style of this building is a combination of traditional Iranian and Western architecture.

== The Ministers’ Door ==
Qajar ministers used to take their cabinet meetings in this building. Cabinet members would enter or leave from a particular door so it acquired the name "the Ministers’ Door". The Prime Minister's carriage, with its seven guards, always stopped in front of this door. This is the only door that its Qajar style façade remains.

== Style ==
The building has two towers in the same shape. Tiling and windows are in an Iranian style partly derived from western architecture.

== Rooms ==
The first floor contains the shah's porch and hall covered with minimalist mirror-work called Ayeneh-kari, with rooms on the sides which together resemble ear rings on a human‘s face. All parts have interesting decorations. These little rooms, with reticular decorations, drawings and mirroring, also can be seen on other floors.

== Decorations ==
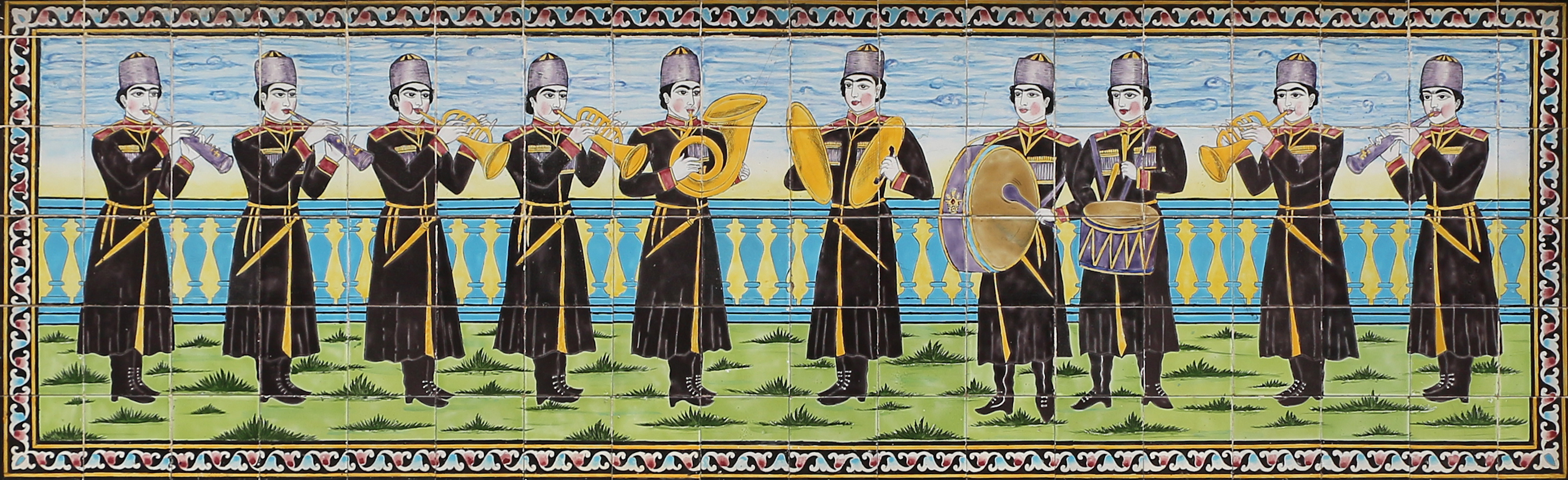
A sample of tiling on the porch of the main building. These are later reproductions of lower quality which were added when a non-original staircase was removed during restoration work.

The floor of the shah's porch and façade are decorated with Qajar style seven colour tiling. Although the style is Iranian, the tiling depicts European natural landscapes and western architecture. The columns’ marble bases are decorated with highlighted motifs of plants and animals faces. It seems these motifs belong to different epochs.

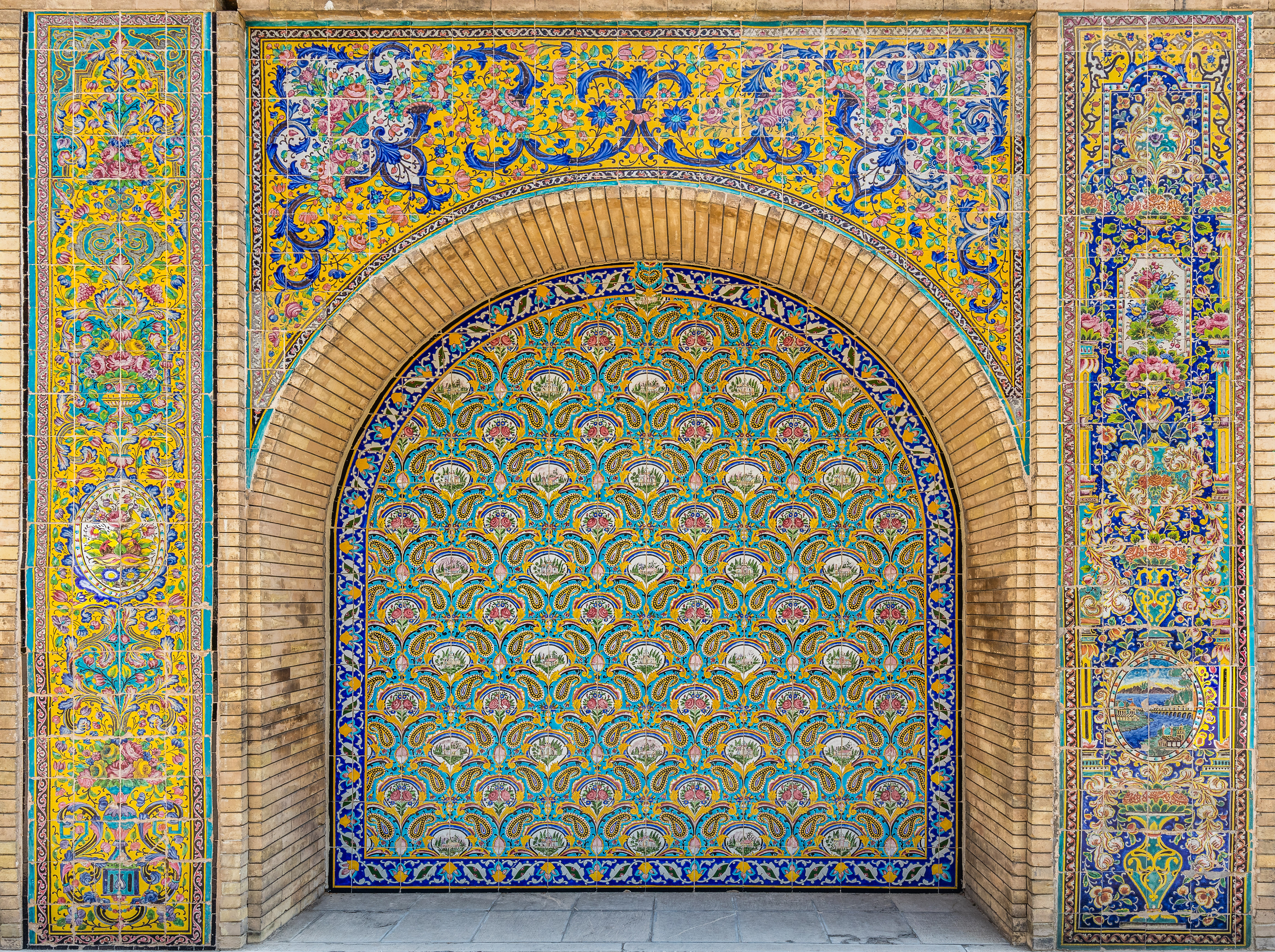
Tiling work on a wall of Shams-ol-Emareh

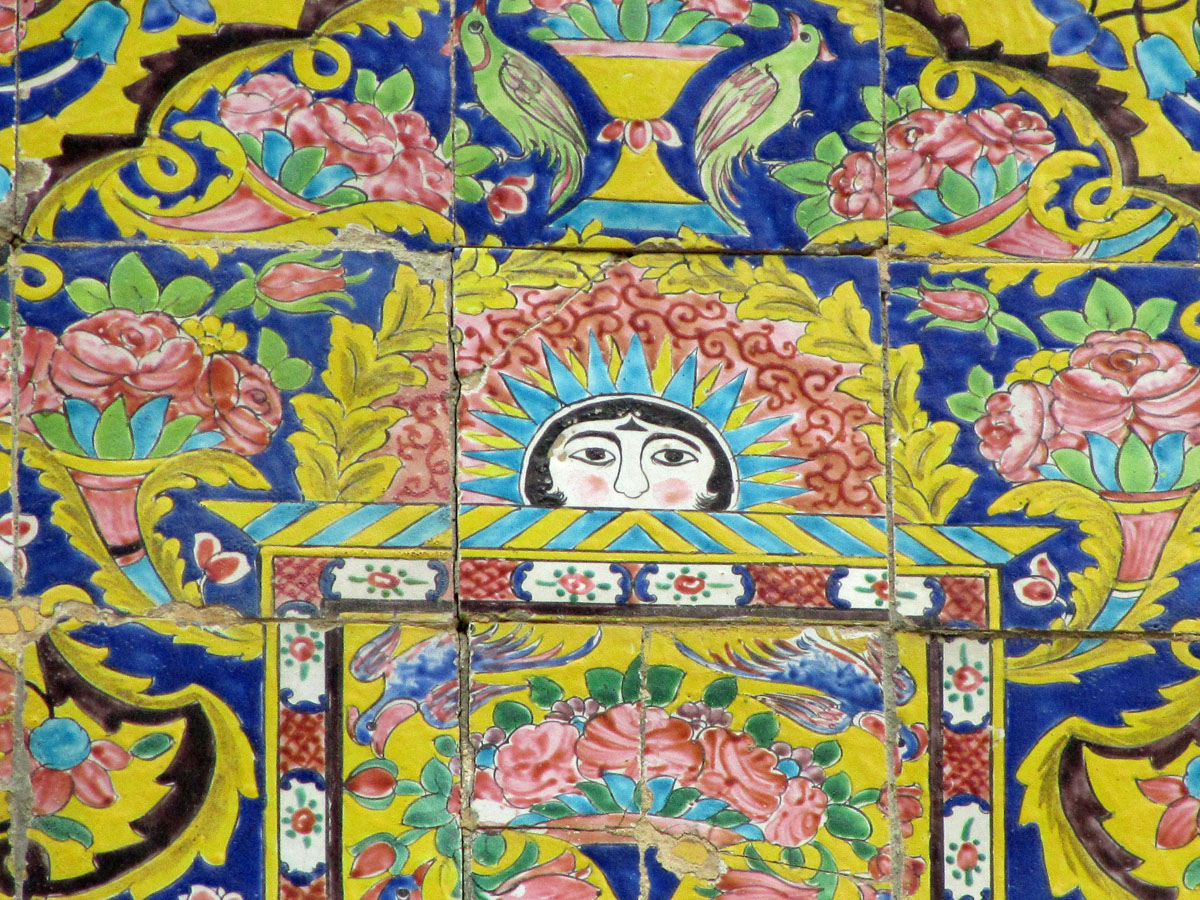
A seven colour tile

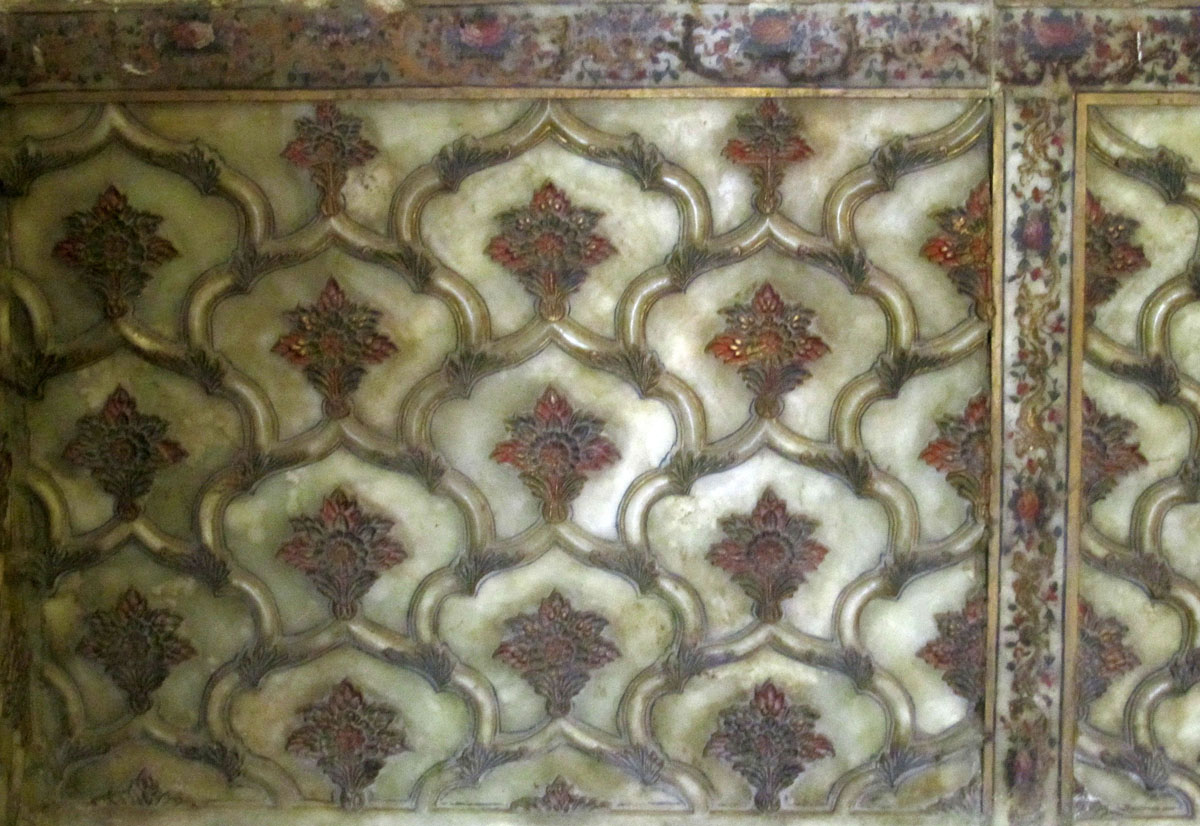
Ground floor

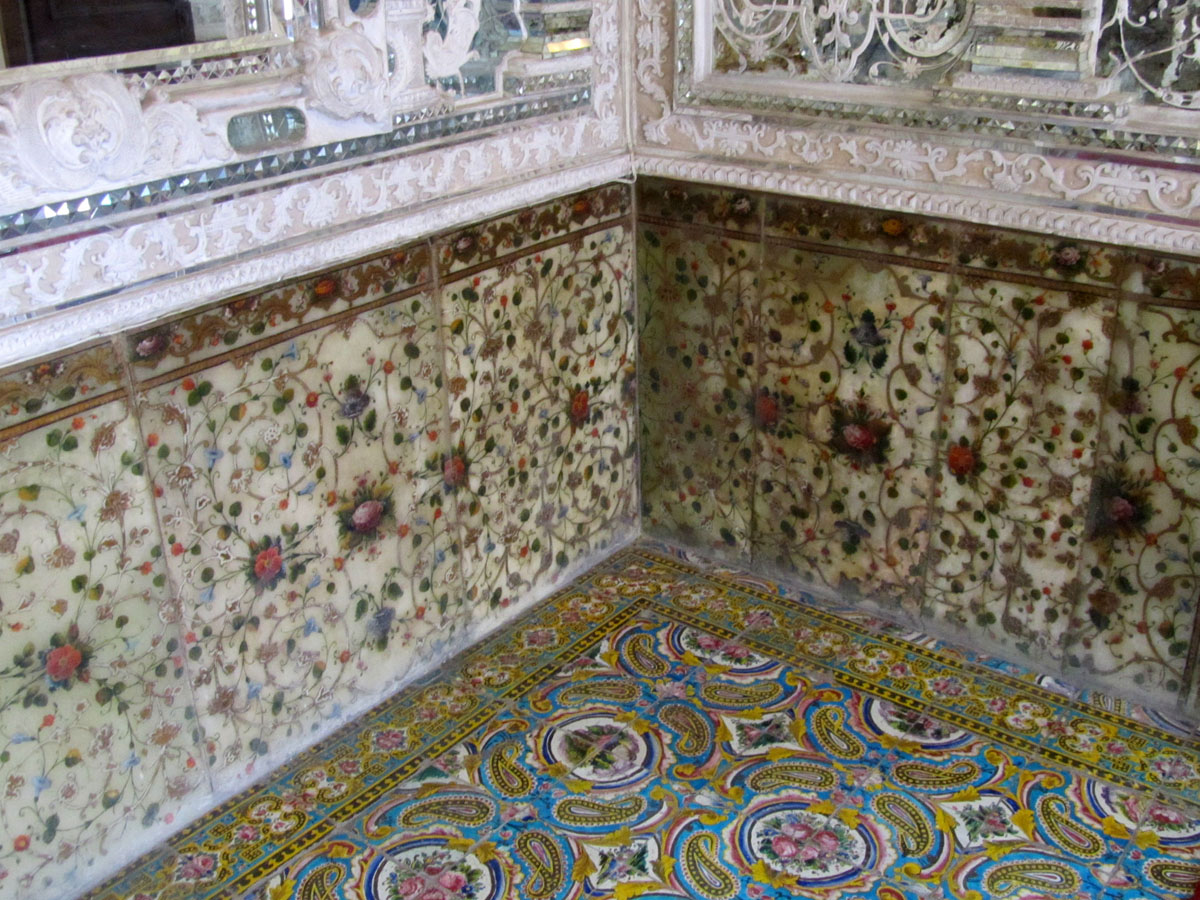
Ground floor

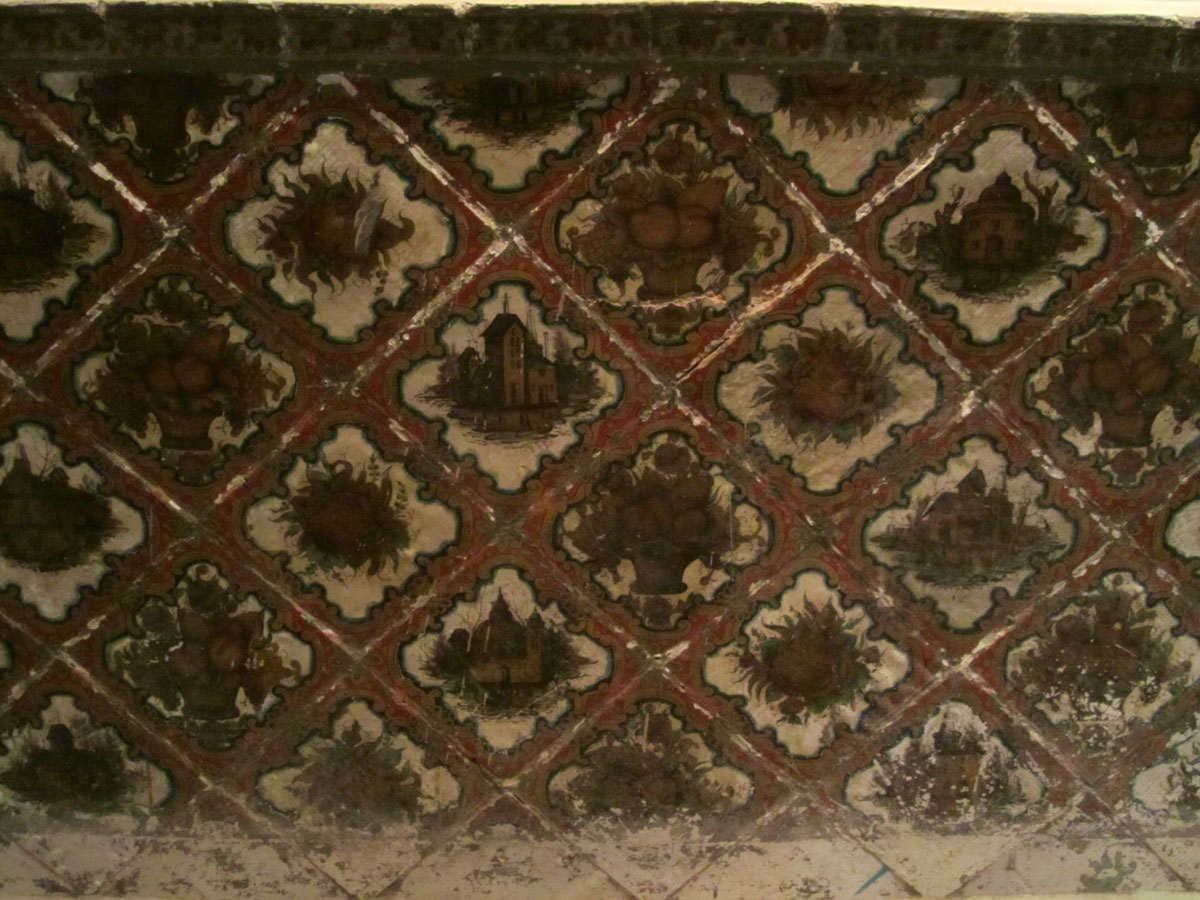
Ground floor

== The clock of Shams-ol-Emareh ==
This clock was a present to Naser al-Din Shah from Queen Victoria of the United Kingdom. The clock was mounted on top of Shams-ol-Emareh so as to inform the people of the then small Tehran, of the local time. The same palace which was built in European style and was distinguished among all buildings adjacent to Golestan Palace.

The loud sound of the clock, however, caused the palace residents to complain which in turn made the Shah to order tone down the sound. The repair work on the clock, however, did not do any good and resulted in the clock to go silent. The clock remained silent for over a hundred years. This silence finally ended on 12 November 2012 after new repairs were completed. The clock bell sounded again.

== Repairs ==
Shams-ol-Emareh went through a period of repairs which ended in 1997. In 1999, the ground floor was opened to the public.

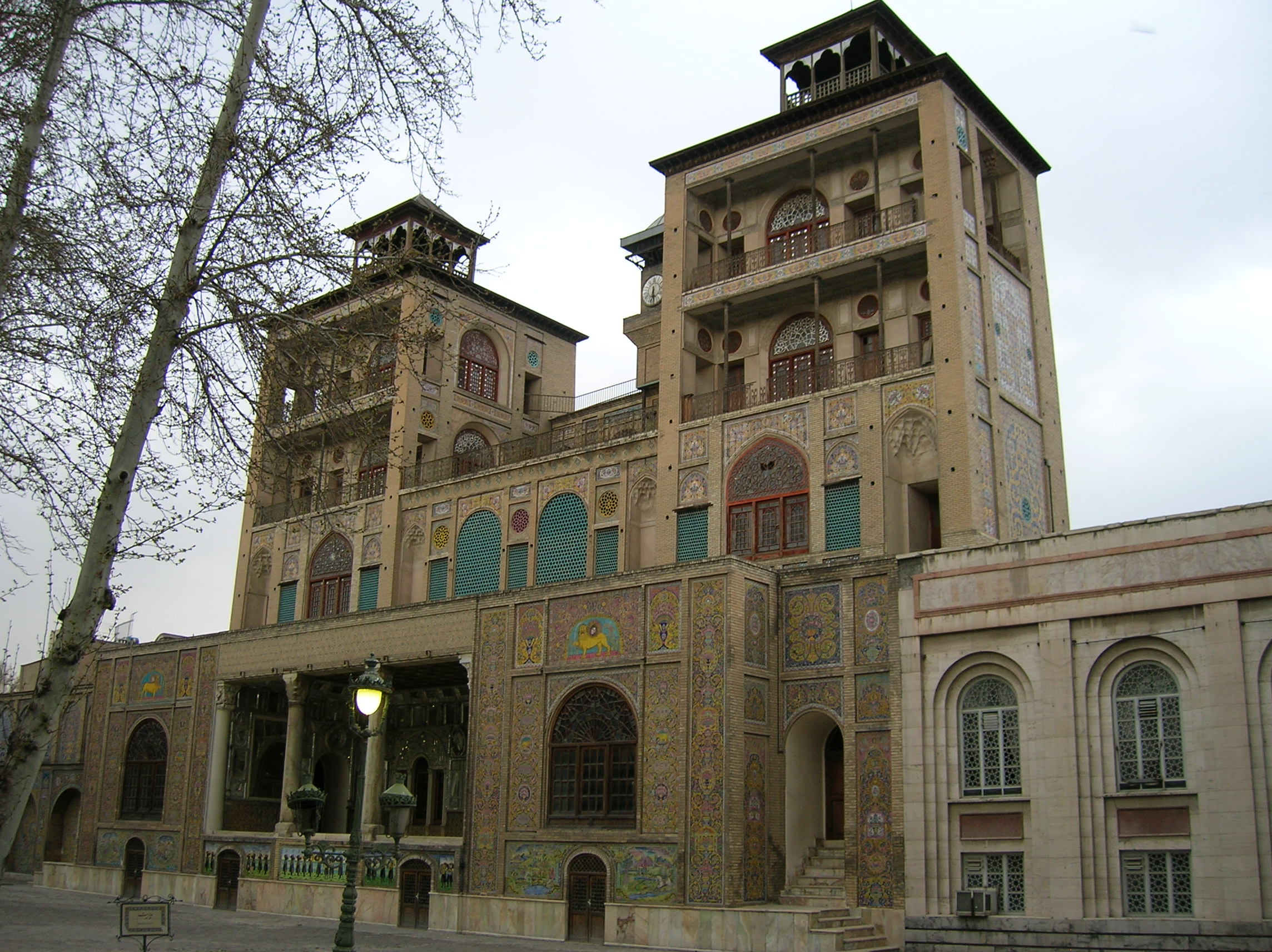
Shams-ol-Emareh (a view from the palace gardens)

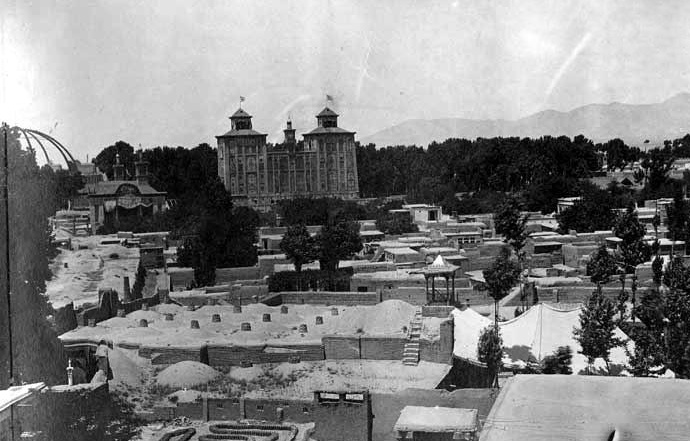
View from the adjacent street

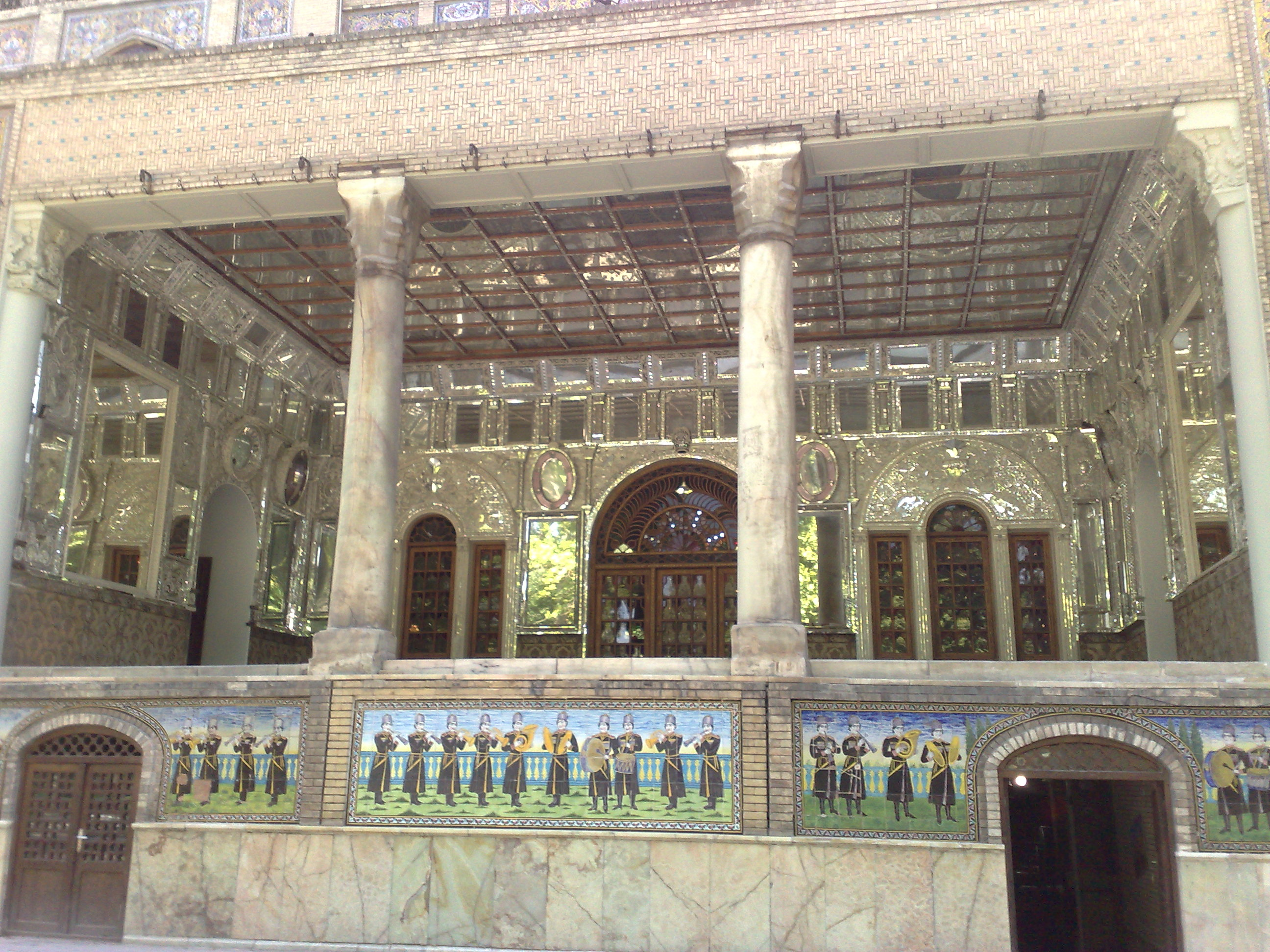
Shams-ol-Emareh's porch decorated with Ayeneh-kari (mirror-work)

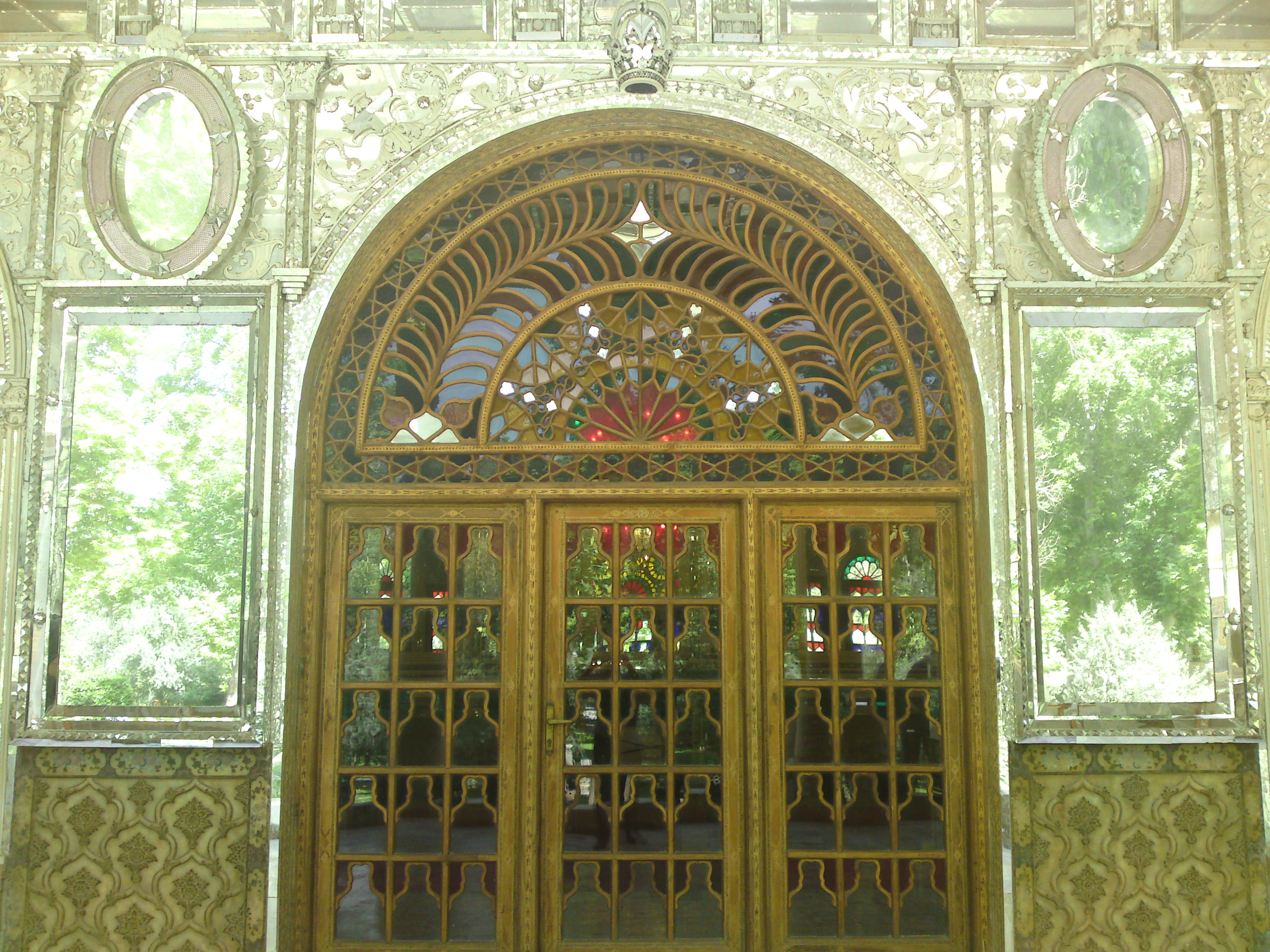
Palace windows

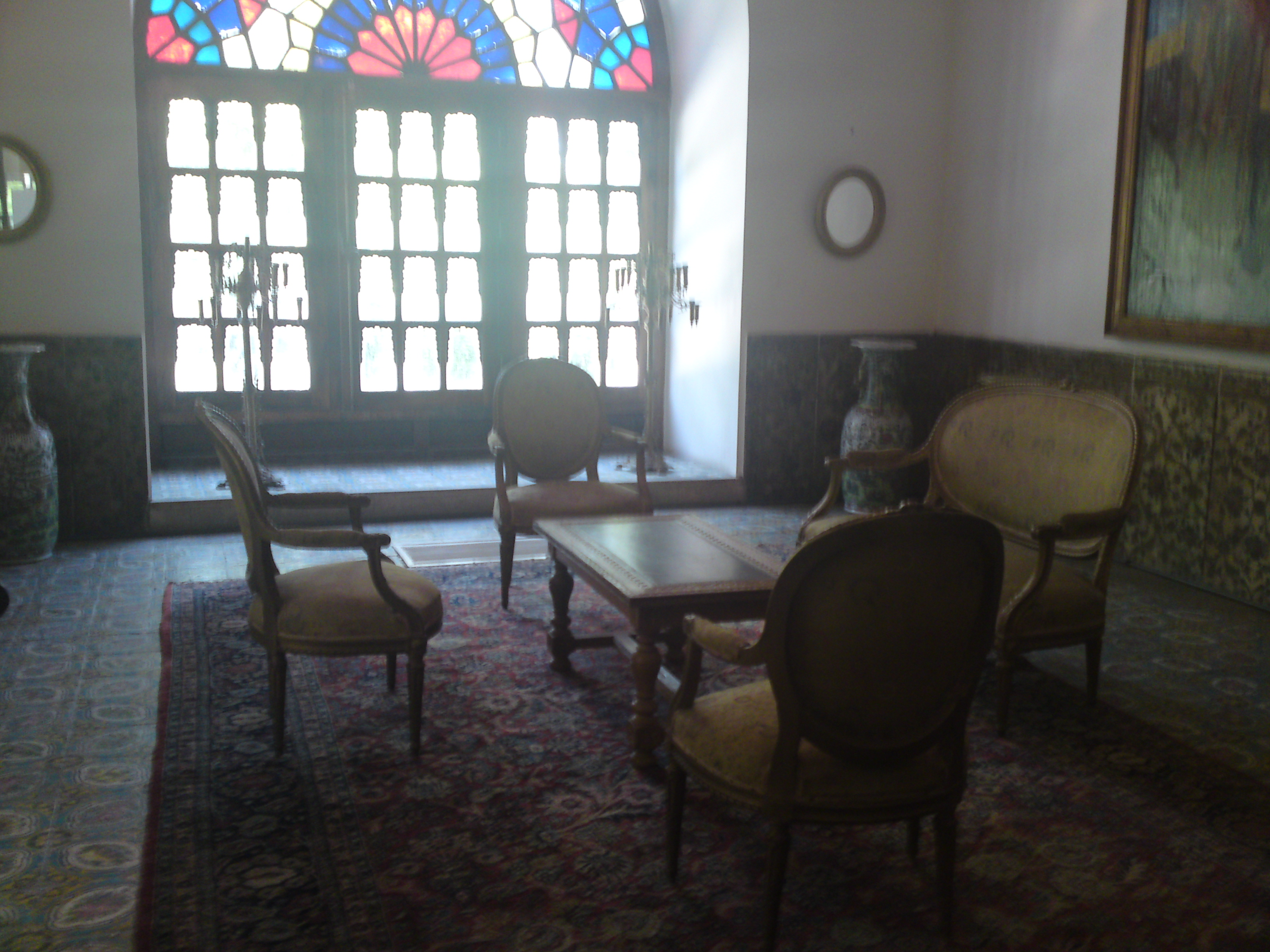
A hall

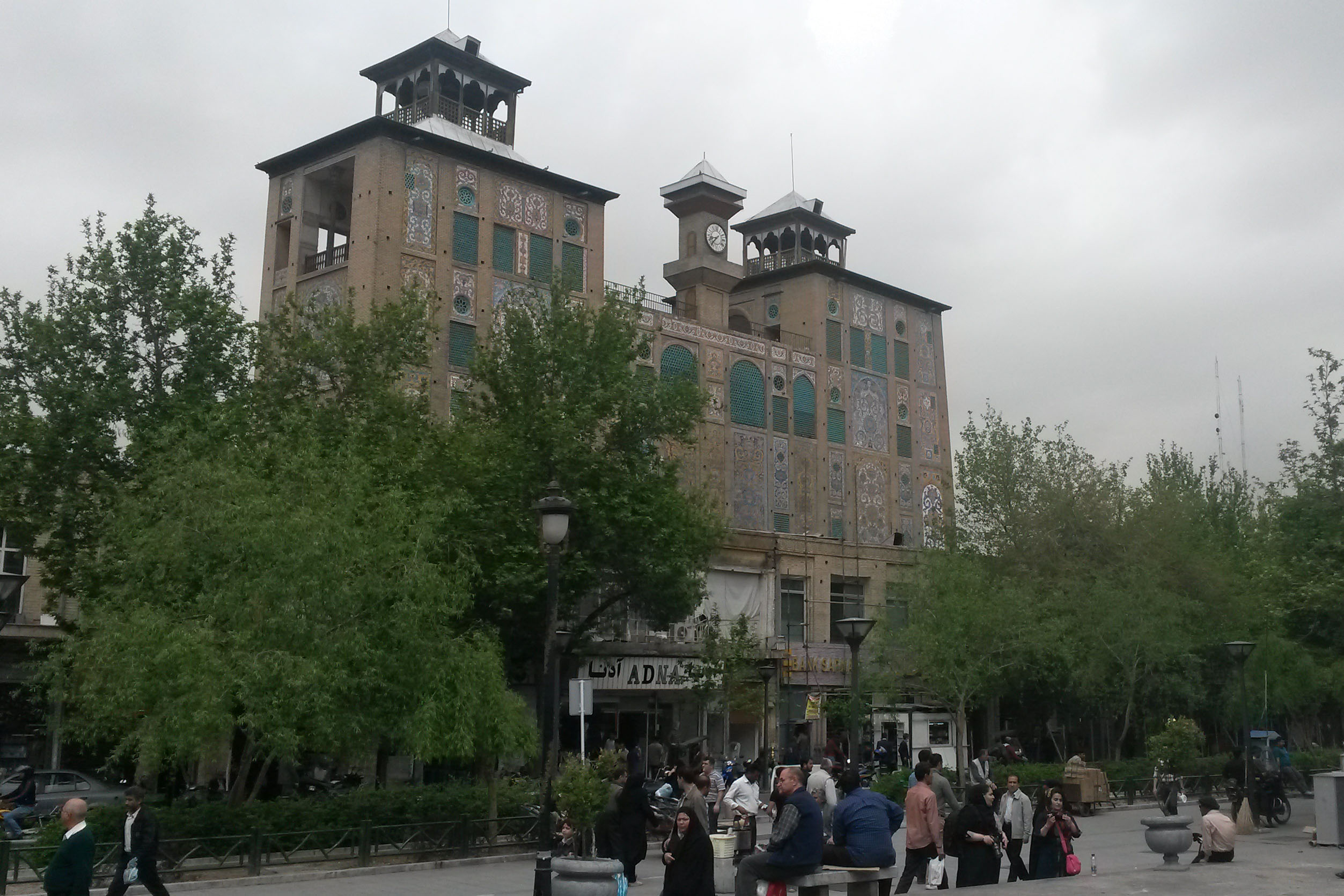
A view of Shams-ol-Emareh

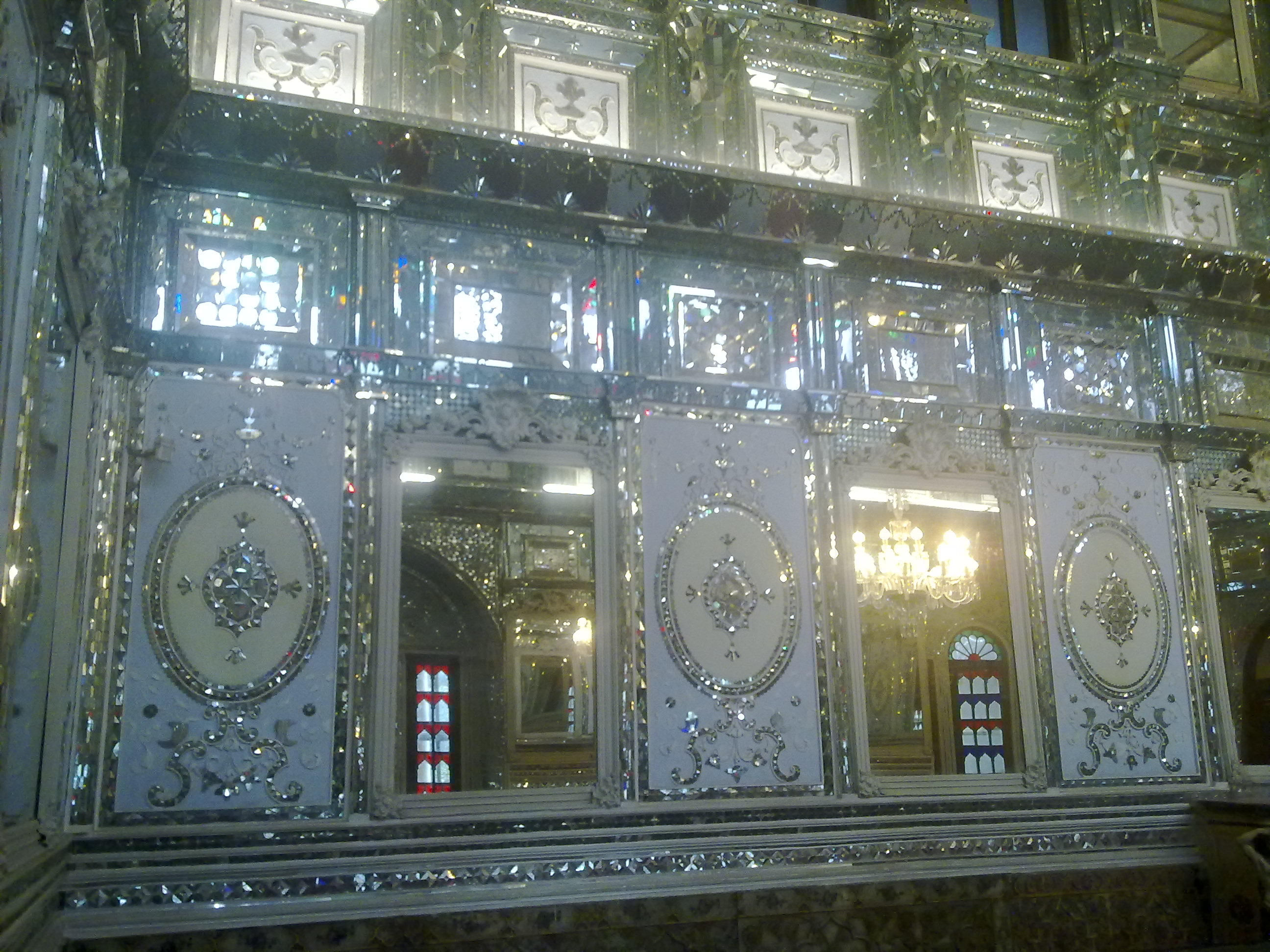
Ayeneh-kari (mirror-work)

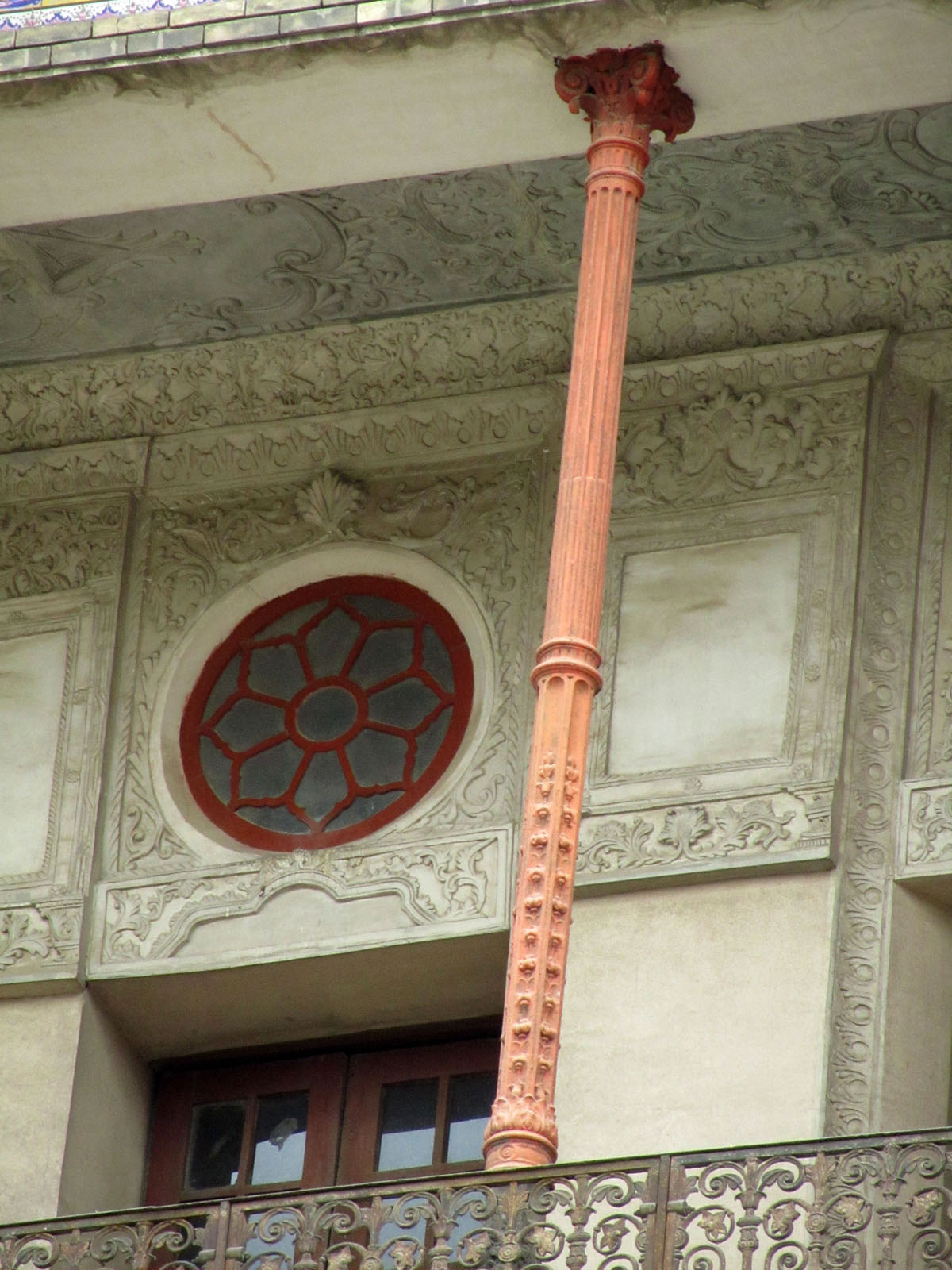
A column

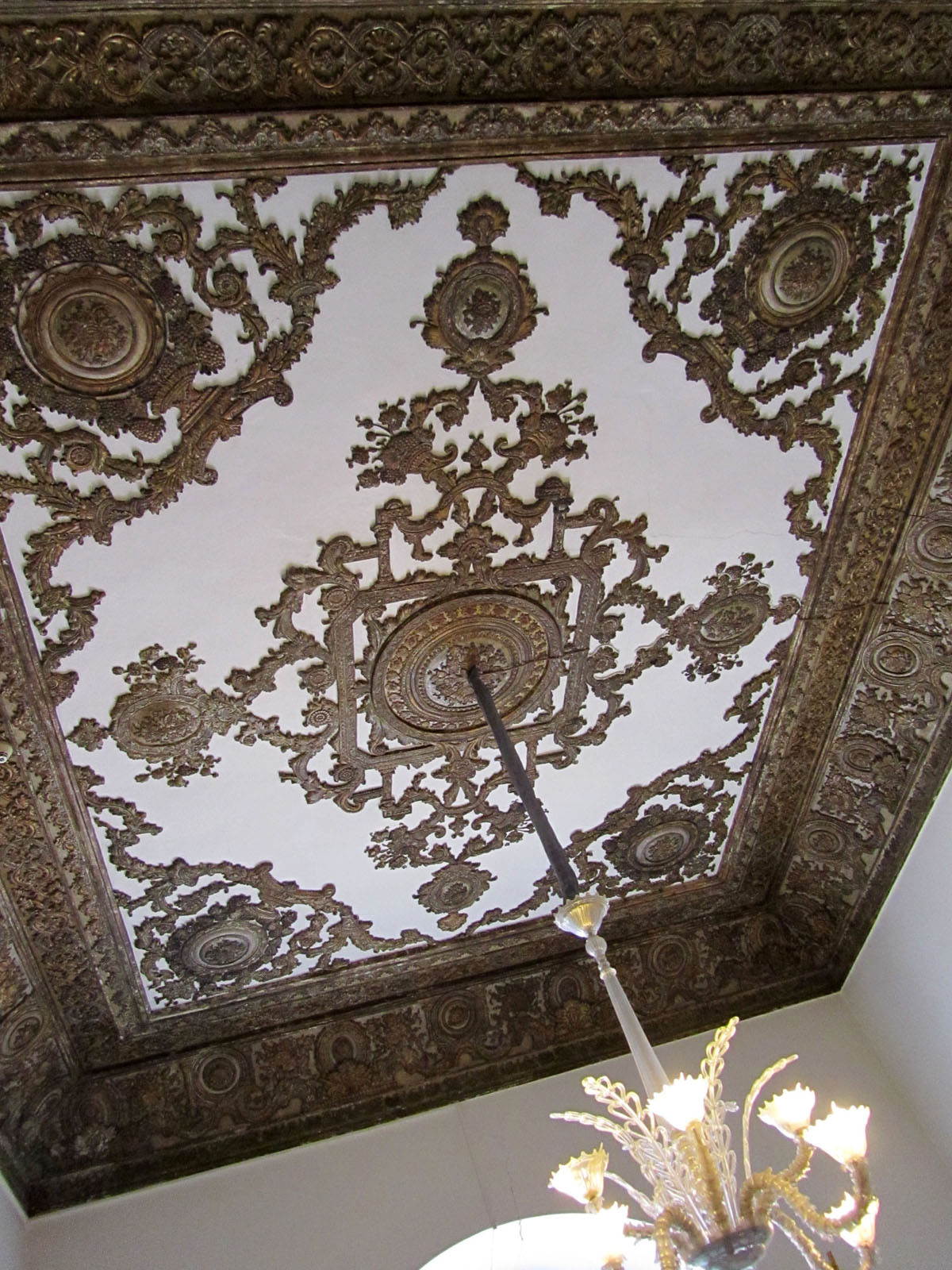
The ceiling of a small room
