= Helan =

Helan may refer to:

== Places ==
- Helan, Mandi Bahauddin, a union council in Phalia Tehsil, Mandi Bahauddin District, Punjab Province, Pakistan

=== Iran ===
- Qeshlaq-e Helan, a village in Ardabil province
- Helan-e Safarali, a village in Chahardangeh Rural District, Hurand District, Ahar County, East Azerbaijan province
- Helan, Bostanabad, a village in Mehranrud-e Jonubi Rural District, Central District, Bostanabad County, East Azerbaijan province
- Helan, Azghan, a village in Azghan Rural District, Central District, Ahar County, East Azerbaijan province
- Helan, Vargahan, a village in Vargahan Rural District, Central District, Ahar County, East Azerbaijan province

=== China ===
- Helan Mountains (贺兰山), in the northwest of China
- Helan County (贺兰县), in Yinchuan, Ningxia
- Helan, Liaoning (河栏镇), a town in Liaoyang County, Liaoning

== People ==
- Princess Dowager Helan (賀蘭太后, 351-396), princess dowager of Northern Wei in imperial China
- Serge Hélan (born 1964), French triple jumper
