= Gechi Qeshlaq =

Gechi Qeshlaq (Persian: گچي قشلاق) may refer to:

- Gechi Qeshlaq Amirlu, Ardabil Province
- Gechi Qeshlaq Hajj Mohammadlu, Ardabil Province
- Gechi Qeshlaq-e Olya, East Azerbaijan Province
- Gechi Qeshlaq-e Sofla, East Azerbaijan Province
- Gechi Qeshlaq-e Vosta, East Azerbaijan Province
