= Holan =

Holan may refer to:

- Holan, also known as Driva, Trøndelag, a village in Oppdal Municipality in Trøndelag county, Norway
- Holan, Azghan, a village in Azghan Rural District, Ahar County, East Azerbaijan Province, Iran
- Holan (surname), a list of people with the surname Holan
