= Qeshlaq-e Hajji Abbas =

Village in Ardabil province, Iran

Qeshlaq-e Hajji Abbas Persian: قشلاق حاجي عباس
- Village
- Location within Iran
- Coordinates: 39°13′23″N 47°34′00″E
- Country: Iran
- Province: Ardabil
- County: Ungut
- District: Darrehrud
- Rural District: Darrehrud-e Shomali

Population (2016)
  - Total: 66
- Time zone: UTC+3:30 (IRST)

Qeshlaq-e Hajji Abbas (Persian: قشلاق حاجي عباس) (Note: Also romanized as Qeshlāq-e Ḩājjī ‘Abbās) is a village in Darrehrud-e Shomali Rural District of Darrehrud District in Ungut County, Ardabil province, Iran.

== Demographics ==
=== Population ===
At the time of the 2006 National Census, the village's population was 52 in nine households, when it was in Angut-e Gharbi Rural District of Ungut District (Note: Renamed the Central District of Ungut County) in Germi County. (Note: Formerly Moghan County) The following census in 2011 counted 51 people in 12 households. The 2016 census measured the population of the village as 66 people in 15 households.

In 2019, the district was separated from the county in the establishment of Ungut County and renamed the Central District. Qeshlaq-e Hajji Abbas was transferred to Darrehrud-e Shomali Rural District created in the new Darrehrud District.
