= Seyyedlar, Ungut =

Village in Ardabil province, Iran

Seyyedlar Persian: سيدلر
- Village
- Location within Iran
- Coordinates: 39°03′15″N 47°39′55″E
- Country: Iran
- Province: Ardabil
- County: Ungut
- District: Darrehrud
- Rural District: Darrehrud-e Jonubi

Population (2016)
  - Total: 85
- Time zone: UTC+3:30 (IRST)

Seyyedlar (Persian: سيدلر) (Note: Also romanized as Seyyed Lar; also known as Naftalu (نفتلو) and Seidlyar) is a village in Darrehrud-e Jonubi Rural District of Darrehrud District in Ungut County, Ardabil province, Iran.

== Demographics ==
=== Population ===
At the time of the 2006 National Census, the village's population was 148 in 31 households, when it was in Angut-e Gharbi Rural District of Ungut District (Note: Renamed the Central District of Ungut County) in Germi County. (Note: Formerly Moghan County) The following census in 2011 counted 109 people in 28 households. The 2016 census measured the population of the village as 85 people in 32 households.

In 2019, the district was separated from the county in the establishment of Ungut County and renamed the Central District. Seyyedlar was transferred to Darrehrud-e Jonubi Rural District created in the new Darrehrud District.
