= Isti =

Isti may refer to:

- Isti (Greece), a town of ancient Greece
- Isti Baghcheh, a village in Ardabil province, Iran
- Isti (Hinduism), one of the five types of yajna in Vedic times
- Istituto di Scienza e Tecnologie dell'Informazione, a research institute of the Consiglio Nazionale delle Ricerche in Italy
