= Qeshlaq-e Hajji Samid =

Village in Ardabil province, Iran

Qeshlaq-e Hajji Samid Persian: قشلاق حاجي صميد
- Village
- Location within Iran
- Coordinates: 39°11′12″N 47°32′51″E
- Country: Iran
- Province: Ardabil
- County: Ungut
- District: Darrehrud
- Rural District: Darrehrud-e Shomali

Population (2016)
  - Total: 65
- Time zone: UTC+3:30 (IRST)

Qeshlaq-e Hajji Samid (Persian: قشلاق حاجي صميد) (Note: Also romanized as Qeshlāq-e Ḩājjī Şamīd) is a village in Darrehrud-e Shomali Rural District of Darrehrud District in Ungut County, Ardabil province, Iran.

== Demographics ==
=== Population ===
At the time of the 2006 National Census, the village's population was 55 in 11 households, when it was in Angut-e Gharbi Rural District of Ungut District (Note: Renamed the Central District of Ungut County) in Germi County. (Note: Formerly Moghan County) The following census in 2011 counted 30 people in eight households. The 2016 census measured the population of the village as 65 people in 18 households.

In 2019, the district was separated from the county in the establishment of Ungut County and renamed the Central District. Qeshlaq-e Hajji Samid was transferred to Darrehrud-e Shomali Rural District created in the new Darrehrud District.
