= Tulan =

Village in Ardabil province, Iran

Tulan Persian: تولان
- Village
- Location within Iran
- Country: Iran
- Province: Ardabil
- County: Ungut
- District: Darrehrud
- Rural District: Darrehrud-e Shomali

Population (2016)
  - Total: 109
- Time zone: UTC+3:30 (IRST)

Tulan (Persian: تولان) (Note: Also romanized as Tūlān) is a village in Darrehrud-e Shomali Rural District of Darrehrud District in Ungut County, Ardabil province, Iran.

== Demographics ==
=== Population ===
At the time of the 2006 National Census, the village's population was 96 in 15 households, when it was in Angut-e Gharbi Rural District of Ungut District (Note: Renamed the Central District of Ungut County) in Germi County. (Note: Formerly Moghan County) The following census in 2011 counted 76 people in 16 households. The 2016 census measured the population of the village as 109 people in 25 households.

In 2019, the district was separated from the county in the establishment of Ungut County and renamed the Central District. Tulan was transferred to Darrehrud-e Shomali Rural District created in the new Darrehrud District.
