= Qarah Saqal =

Qarah Saqal or Qareh Saqqal or Qareh Saqal (Persian: قره سقال) may refer to:

- Qeshlaq-e Qareh Seqal, Ardabil province
- Qarah Saqal, East Azerbaijan
- Qareh Saqqal, Kurdistan
- Qareh Saqqal, West Azerbaijan
