= Bagheshlu =

Bagheshlu (Persian: باغشلو) may refer to:

- Bagheshlu, Ardabil
- Bagheshlu, East Azerbaijan
