= Qarajeh Aghal =

Village in Ardabil province, Iran

Qarajeh Aghal Persian: قراجه اغل
- Village
- Location within Iran
- Coordinates: 39°08′47″N 47°32′54″E
- Country: Iran
- Province: Ardabil
- County: Ungut
- District: Darrehrud
- Rural District: Darrehrud-e Shomali

Population (2016)
  - Total: 112
- Time zone: UTC+3:30 (IRST)

Qarajeh Aghal (Persian: قراجه اغل) (Note: Also known as Qarahchah Dāgh-e Ākhlī, Qarahjah Aghle, and Qarahjah Āghle) is a village in Darrehrud-e Shomali Rural District of Darrehrud District in Ungut County, Ardabil province, Iran.

== Demographics ==
=== Population ===
At the time of the 2006 National Census, the village's population was 135 in 30 households, when it was in Angut-e Gharbi Rural District of Ungut District (Note: Renamed the Central District of Ungut County) in Germi County. (Note: Formerly Moghan County) The following census in 2011 counted 125 people in 32 households. The 2016 census measured the population of the village as 112 people in 33 households.

In 2019, the district was separated from the county in the establishment of Ungut County and renamed the Central District. Qarajeh Aghal was transferred to Darrehrud-e Shomali Rural District created in the new Darrehrud District.
