= Lakarabad =

Lakarabad (Persian: لكراباد) may refer to:

- Lakarabad-e Olya
- Lakarabad-e Sofla
