= Gechi Qeshlaq Hajj Mohammadlu =

Village in Ardabil province, Iran

Gechi Qeshlaq Hajj Mohammadlu Persian: گچي قشلاق حاج محمدلو
- Village
- Location within Iran
- Coordinates: 39°12′53″N 47°31′47″E
- Country: Iran
- Province: Ardabil
- County: Ungut
- District: Darrehrud
- Rural District: Darrehrud-e Shomali

Population (2016)
  - Total: 34
- Time zone: UTC+3:30 (IRST)

Gechi Qeshlaq Hajj Mohammadlu (Persian: گچي قشلاق حاج محمدلو) (Note: Also romanized as Gechī Qeshlāq Ḩājj Moḩammadlū) is a village in Darrehrud-e Shomali Rural District of Darrehrud District in Ungut County, Ardabil province, Iran.

== Demographics ==
=== Population ===
At the time of the 2006 National Census, the village's population was 50 in 10 households, when it was in Angut-e Gharbi Rural District of Ungut District (Note: Renamed the Central District of Ungut County) in Germi County. (Note: Formerly Moghan County) The following census in 2011 counted 43 people in nine households. The 2016 census measured the population of the village as 34 people in 10 households.

In 2020, the district was separated from the county in the establishment of Ungut County and renamed the Central District. Gechi Qeshlaq Hajj Mohammadlu was transferred to Darrehrud-e Shomali Rural District created in the new Darrehrud District.
