= Qeshlaq-e Barian =

Village in Ardabil province, Iran

Qeshlaq-e Barian Persian: قشلاق بريان
- Village
- Location within Iran
- Coordinates: 39°02′56″N 47°32′16″E
- Country: Iran
- Province: Ardabil
- County: Ungut
- District: Darrehrud
- Rural District: Darrehrud-e Jonubi

Population (2016)
  - Total: 179
- Time zone: UTC+3:30 (IRST)

Qeshlaq-e Barian (Persian: قشلاق بريان) (Note: Also romanized as Qeshlāq-e Barīān) is a village in Darrehrud-e Jonubi Rural District of Darrehrud District in Ungut County, Ardabil province, Iran.

== Demographics ==
=== Population ===
At the time of the 2006 National Census, the village's population was 202 in 38 households, when it was in Angut-e Gharbi Rural District of Ungut District (Note: Renamed the Central District of Ungut County) in Germi County. (Note: Formerly Moghan County) The following census in 2011 counted 200 people in 48 households. The 2016 census measured the population of the village as 179 people in 45 households.

In 2019, the district was separated from the county in the establishment of Ungut County and renamed the Central District. Qeshlaq-e Barian was transferred to Darrehrud-e Jonubi Rural District created in the new Darrehrud District.
