= Ali Qapu (disambiguation) =

Ali Qapu (also spelled Āli Qapu or Aali Qapu) is an imperial palace in Isfahan, Iran which served as the official residence of Persian emperors of the Safavid dynasty.

It may also refer to:

- East Azerbaijan Governance Palace, Tabriz, Iran, known as Aali Qapu during Safavid times
- Ali Qapu, Ardabil, a village in Ardabil Province, Iran
