= Qeshlaq-e Olya, Ardabil =

Village in Ardabil province, Iran

Qeshlaq-e Olya Persian: قشلاق عليا
- Village
- Country: Iran
- Province: Ardabil
- County: Ungut
- District: Darrehrud
- Rural District: Darrehrud-e Shomali

Population (2016)
  - Total: 18
- Time zone: UTC+3:30 (IRST)

Qeshlaq-e Olya (Persian: قشلاق عليا) (Note: Also romanized as Qeshlāq-e ‘Olyā; also known as Dūz Qeshlāq (دوزقشلاق)) is a village in Darrehrud-e Shomali Rural District of Darrehrud District in Ungut County, Ardabil province, Iran.

== Demographics ==
=== Population ===
At the time of the 2006 National Census, the village's population was 36 in seven households, when it was in Angut-e Gharbi Rural District of Ungut District (Note: Renamed the Central District of Ungut County) in Germi County. (Note: Formerly Moghan County) The following census in 2011 counted 23 people in four households. The 2016 census measured the population of the village as 18 people in four households.

In 2019, the district was separated from the county in the establishment of Ungut County and renamed the Central District. Qeshlaq-e Olya was transferred to Darrehrud-e Shomali Rural District created in the new Darrehrud District.
