= Qarah Khan Beyglu =

Village in Ardabil province, Iran

Qarah Khan Beyglu Persian: قره خان بيگلو
- Village
- Location within Iran
- Coordinates: 39°05′27″N 47°39′16″E
- Country: Iran
- Province: Ardabil
- County: Ungut
- District: Darrehrud
- Rural District: Darrehrud-e Jonubi

Population (2016)
  - Total: 922
- Time zone: UTC+3:30 (IRST)

Qarah Khan Beyglu (Persian: قره خان بيگلو) (Note: Also romanized as Qarah Khān Beyglū and Qareh Khān Beyglū) is a village in, and the capital of, Darrehrud-e Jonubi Rural District in Darrehrud District of Ungut County, Ardabil province, Iran.

== Demographics ==
=== Population ===
At the time of the 2006 National Census, the village's population was 990 in 192 households, when it was in Angut-e Gharbi Rural District of Ungut District (Note: Renamed the Central District of Ungut County) in Germi County. (Note: Formerly Moghan County) The following census in 2011 counted 1,149 people in 317 households. The 2016 census measured the population of the village as 922 people in 267 households.

In 2019, the district was separated from the county in the establishment of Ungut County and renamed the Central District. Qarah Khan Beyglu was transferred to Darrehrud-e Jonubi Rural District created in the new Darrehrud District.
