= Delik =

Delik (Persian: دليك) may refer to:

- Delik Yarqan, Ardabil Province, Iran
- Delik-e Tayebi, Kohgiluyeh and Boyer-Ahmad Province, Iran
