= Qarah Aghajlu =

Qarah Aghajlu (Persian: قره اغاجلو) may refer to:

- Qarah Aghajlu, Ardabil
- Qarah Aghajlu-ye Bala, Ardabil Province
- Qarah Aghajlu-ye Pain, Ardabil Province
- Qarah Aghajlu, West Azerbaijan
