= Hajji Abbas Kandi =

Village in Ardabil province, Iran

Hajji Abbas Kandi Persian: حاجي عباس كندي
- Village
- Location within Iran
- Coordinates: 39°13′04″N 47°34′39″E
- Country: Iran
- Province: Ardabil
- County: Ungut
- District: Darrehrud
- Rural District: Darrehrud-e Shomali

Population (2016)
  - Total: 24
- Time zone: UTC+3:30 (IRST)

Hajji Abbas Kandi (Persian: حاجي عباس كندي) (Note: Also romanized as Ḩājjī ‘Abbās Kandī) is a village in Darrehrud-e Shomali Rural District of Darrehrud District in Ungut County, Ardabil province, Iran.

== Demographics ==
=== Population ===
At the time of the 2006 National Census, the village's population was 26 in five households, when it was in Angut-e Gharbi Rural District of Ungut District (Note: Renamed the Central District of Ungut County) in Germi County. (Note: Formerly Moghan County) The following census in 2011 counted 17 people in four households. The 2016 census measured the population of the village as 24 people in five households. Hajji Abbas Kandi was transferred to Darrehrud-e Shomali Rural District created in the new Darrehrud District.
