= Qeshlaq-e Qarah Qayeh =

Village in Ardabil province, Iran

Qeshlaq-e Qarah Qayeh Persian: قشلاق قره قيه
- Village
- Location within Iran
- Coordinates: 39°02′54″N 47°36′57″E
- Country: Iran
- Province: Ardabil
- County: Ungut
- District: Darrehrud
- Rural District: Darrehrud-e Jonubi

Population (2016)
  - Total: 37
- Time zone: UTC+3:30 (IRST)

Qeshlaq-e Qarah Qayeh (Persian: قشلاق قره قيه) (Note: Also romanized as Qeshlāq-e Qarah Qayeh) is a village in Darrehrud-e Jonubi Rural District of Darrehrud District in Ungut County, Ardabil province, Iran.

== Demographics ==
=== Population ===
At the time of the 2006 National Census, the village's population was 42 in 10 households, when it was in Angut-e Gharbi Rural District of Ungut District (Note: Renamed the Central District of Ungut County) in Germi County. (Note: Formerly Moghan County) The following census in 2011 counted 47 people in 11 households. The 2016 census measured the population of the village as 37 people in 12 households.

In 2019, the district was separated from the county in the establishment of Ungut County and renamed the Central District. Qeshlaq-e Qarah Qayeh was transferred to Darrehrud-e Jonubi Rural District created in the new Darrehrud District.
