= Kadkhodalu =

Village in Ardabil province, Iran

Kadkhodalu Persian: كدخدالو
- Village
- Location within Iran
- Coordinates: 39°06′35″N 47°32′26″E
- Country: Iran
- Province: Ardabil
- County: Ungut
- District: Darrehrud
- Rural District: Darrehrud-e Shomali

Population (2016)
  - Total: 189
- Time zone: UTC+3:30 (IRST)

Kadkhodalu (Persian: كدخدالو} (Note: Also romanized as Kadkhodālū) is a village in Darrehrud-e Shomali Rural District of Darrehrud District in Ungut County, Ardabil province, Iran.

== Demographics ==
=== Population ===
At the time of the 2006 National Census, the village's population was 274 in 50 households, when it was in Angut-e Gharbi Rural District of Ungut District (Note: Renamed the Central District of Ungut County) in Germi County. (Note: Formerly Moghan County) The following census in 2011 counted 241 people in 59 households. The 2016 census measured the population of the village as 189 people in 46 households.

In 2019, the district was separated from the county in the establishment of Ungut County and renamed the Central District. Kadkhodalu was transferred to Darrehrud-e Shomali Rural District created in the new Darrehrud District.
