= Ilkhchi, Ungut =

Village in Ardabil province, Iran

Ilkhchi Persian: ایلخچی
- Village
- Location within Iran
- Country: Iran
- Province: Ardabil
- County: Ungut
- District: Darrehrud
- Rural District: Darrehrud-e Shomali

Population (2016)
  - Total: 213
- Time zone: UTC+3:30 (IRST)

Ilkhchi (Persian: ايلخچي) (Note: Also romanized as Īlkhchī; also known as Īlkhchīh-ye Bālā, Qeshlāq-e Īlkhchī, and Vilkhidje) is a village in Darrehrud-e Shomali Rural District of Darrehrud District in Ungut County, Ardabil province, Iran.

== Demographics ==
=== Population ===
At the time of the 2006 National Census, the village's population was 296 in 59 households, when it was in Angut-e Gharbi Rural District of Ungut District (Note: Renamed the Central District of Ungut County) in Germi County. (Note: Formerly Moghan County) The following census in 2011 counted 241 people in 66 households. The 2016 census measured the population of the village as 213 people in 63 households.

In 2019, the district was separated from the county in the establishment of Ungut County and renamed the Central District. Ilkhchi was transferred to Darrehrud-e Shomali Rural District created in the new Darrehrud District.
