= Quytul =

Quytul may refer to:

- Quytul, Ardabil, Iran
- Quytul, East Azerbaijan, Iran
- Quytul, Azerbaijan
