= Mal Qeshlaqi =

Village in Ardabil province, Iran

Mal Qeshlaqi Persian: مال قشلاقي
- Village
- Location within Iran
- Coordinates: 39°09′55″N 47°36′33″E
- Country: Iran
- Province: Ardabil
- County: Ungut
- District: Darrehrud
- Rural District: Darrehrud-e Shomali

Population (2016)
  - Total: 22
- Time zone: UTC+3:30 (IRST)

Mal Qeshlaqi (Persian: مال قشلاقي) (Note: Also romanized as Māl Qeshlāqī, Malqeshlaqi, and Mālqeshlāqī; also known as Māl Qeshlāq) is a village in Darrehrud-e Shomali Rural District of Darrehrud District in Ungut County, Ardabil province, Iran.

== Demographics ==
=== Population ===
At the time of the 2006 National Census, the village's population was 28 in six households, when it was in Angut-e Gharbi Rural District of Ungut District (Note: Renamed the Central District of Ungut County) in Germi County. (Note: Formerly Moghan County) The following census in 2011 counted 31 people in 11 households. The 2016 census measured the population of the village as 22 people in five households.

In 2019, the district was separated from the county in the establishment of Ungut County and renamed the Central District. Mal Qeshlaqi was transferred to Darrehrud-e Shomali Rural District created in the new Darrehrud District.
