= Tazehabad-e Lakarabad =

Village in Ardabil province, Iran

Tazehabad-e Lakarabad Persian: تازه آباد لکرآباد
- Village
- Country: Iran
- Province: Ardabil
- County: Ungut
- District: Darrehrud
- Rural District: Darrehrud-e Jonubi

Population (2016)
  - Total: 26
- Time zone: UTC+3:30 (IRST)

Tazehabad-e Lakarabad (Persian: تازه آباد لکرآباد) (Note: Also romanized as Tāzehābād-e Lakarābād) is a village in Darrehrud-e Jonubi Rural District of Darrehrud District in Ungut County, Ardabil province, Iran.

== Demographics ==
=== Population ===
The village did not appear in the 2006 and 2011 National Censuses. The 2016 census measured the population of the village as 26 people in six households, when it was in Angut-e Gharbi Rural District of Ungut District (Note: Renamed the Central District of Ungut County) in Germi County. (Note: Formerly Moghan County)

In 2019, the district was separated from the county in the establishment of Ungut County and renamed the Central District. Tazehabad-e Lakarabad was transferred to Darrehrud-e Jonubi Rural District created in the new Darrehrud District.
