= Adam Darrehsi =

Adam Darrehsi (Persian: ادام دره سي) may refer to:

- Adam Darrehsi-ye Olya
- Adam Darrehsi-ye Sofla
