= Dikdash =

Village in Ardabil province, Iran

Dikdash Persian: ديك داش
- Village
- Location within Iran
- Coordinates: 39°12′30″N 47°32′25″E
- Country: Iran
- Province: Ardabil
- County: Ungut
- District: Darrehrud
- Rural District: Darrehrud-e Shomali

Population (2016)
  - Total: 197
- Time zone: UTC+3:30 (IRST)

Dikdash (Persian: ديك داش) (Note: Also romanized as Dīkdāsh) is a village in Darrehrud-e Shomali Rural District of Darrehrud District in Ungut County, Ardabil province, Iran.

== Demographics ==
=== Population ===
At the time of the 2006 National Census, the village's population was 262 in 46 households, when it was in Angut-e Gharbi Rural District of Ungut District (Note: Renamed the Central District of Ungut County) in Germi County. (Note: Formerly Moghan County) The following census in 2011 counted 186 people in 46 households. The 2016 census measured the population of the village as 197 people in 51 households.

In 2019, the district was separated from the county in the establishment of Ungut County and renamed the Central District. Dikdash was transferred to Darrehrud-e Shomali Rural District created in the new Darrehrud District.
