= Qeshlaq-e Aqa Baba =

Village in Ardabil province, Iran

Qeshlaq-e Aqa Baba Persian: قشلاق اقابابا
- Village
- Location within Iran
- Coordinates: 39°11′22″N 47°35′50″E
- Country: Iran
- Province: Ardabil
- County: Ungut
- District: Darrehrud
- Rural District: Darrehrud-e Shomali

Population (2016)
  - Total: 145
- Time zone: UTC+3:30 (IRST)

Qeshlaq-e Aqa Baba (Persian: قشلاق اقابابا) (Note: Also romanized as Qeshlāq-e Āqā Bābā) is a village in Darrehrud-e Shomali Rural District of Darrehrud District in Ungut County, Ardabil province, Iran.

== Demographics ==
=== Population ===
At the time of the 2006 National Census, the village's population was 205 in 40 households, when it was in Angut-e Gharbi Rural District of Ungut District (Note: Renamed the Central District of Ungut County) in Germi County. (Note: Formerly Moghan County) The following census in 2011 counted 184 people in 45 households. The 2016 census measured the population of the village as 145 people in 37 households.

In 2019, the district was separated from the county in the establishment of Ungut County and renamed the Central District. Qeshlaq-e Aqa Baba was transferred to Darrehrud-e Shomali Rural District created in the new Darrehrud District.
