= Sarvaghaji =

Village in Ardabil province, Iran

Sarvaghaji Persian: سرواغاجي
- Village
- Location within Iran
- Coordinates: 39°03′36″N 47°33′13″E
- Country: Iran
- Province: Ardabil
- County: Ungut
- District: Darrehrud
- Rural District: Darrehrud-e Jonubi

Population (2016)
  - Total: 492
- Time zone: UTC+3:30 (IRST)

Sarvaghaji (Persian: سرواغاجي) (Note: Also romanized as Sarvāghājī; also known as Salīm Āghāj, Salīm Āghājī (سليم اغاجي), and Sāmbaghājī) is a village in Darrehrud-e Jonubi Rural District of Darrehrud District in Ungut County, Ardabil province, Iran.

== Demographics ==
=== Population ===
At the time of the 2006 National Census, the village's population was 528 in 95 households, when it was in Angut-e Gharbi Rural District of Ungut District (Note: Renamed the Central District of Ungut County) in Germi County. (Note: Formerly Moghan County) The following census in 2011 counted 475 people in 112 households. The 2016 census measured the population of the village as 492 people in 135 households.

In 2019, the district was separated from the county in the establishment of Ungut County and renamed the Central District. Sarvaghaji was transferred to Darrehrud-e Jonubi Rural District created in the new Darrehrud District.
