= Lekvan, Ungut =

Village in Ardabil province, Iran

Lekvan Persian: لكوان
- Village
- Location within Iran
- Coordinates: 39°08′14″N 47°32′20″E
- Country: Iran
- Province: Ardabil
- County: Ungut
- District: Darrehrud
- Rural District: Darrehrud-e Shomali

Population (2016)
  - Total: 348
- Time zone: UTC+3:30 (IRST)

Lekvan (Persian: لكوان) (Note: Also romanized as Lakvān and Lekvān; also known as Yakvān and Yekvān) is a village in Darrehrud-e Shomali Rural District of Darrehrud District in Ungut County, Ardabil province, Iran.

== Demographics ==
=== Population ===
At the time of the 2006 National Census, the village's population was 408 in 82 households, when it was in Angut-e Gharbi Rural District of Ungut District (Note: Renamed the Central District of Ungut County) in Germi County. (Note: Formerly Moghan County) The following census in 2011 counted 386 people in 97 households. The 2016 census measured the population of the village as 348 people in 91 households.

In 2019, the district was separated from the county in the establishment of Ungut County and renamed the Central District. Lekvan was transferred to Darrehrud-e Shomali Rural District created in the new Darrehrud District.
