= Qeshlaq-e Anjirlu =

Village in Ardabil province, Iran

Qeshlaq-e Anjirlu Persian: قشلاق انجيرلو
- Village
- Location within Iran
- Coordinates: 39°03′27″N 47°35′06″E
- Country: Iran
- Province: Ardabil
- County: Ungut
- District: Darrehrud
- Rural District: Darrehrud-e Jonubi

Population (2016)
  - Total: Below reporting threshold
- Time zone: UTC+3:30 (IRST)

Qeshlaq-e Anjirlu (Persian: قشلاق انجيرلو) (Note: Also romanized as Qeshlāq-e Anjīrlū) is a village in Darrehrud-e Jonubi Rural District of Darrehrud District in Ungut County, Ardabil province, Iran.

== Demographics ==
=== Population ===
The village did not appear in the 2006 National Census, when it was in Angut-e Gharbi Rural District of Ungut District (Note: Renamed the Central District of Ungut County) in Germi County. (Note: Formerly Moghan County) The following census in 2011 counted 14 people in four households. The 2016 census measured the population of the village as below the reporting threshold.

In 2019, the district was separated from the county in the establishment of Ungut County and renamed the Central District. Qeshlaq-e Anjirlu was transferred to Darrehrud-e Jonubi Rural District created in the new Darrehrud District.
