= Qeshlaq-e Zargar =

Village in Ardabil province, Iran

Qeshlaq-e Zargar Persian: قشلاق زرگر
- Village
- Location within Iran
- Coordinates: 39°03′14″N 47°36′07″E
- Country: Iran
- Province: Ardabil
- County: Ungut
- District: Darrehrud
- Rural District: Darrehrud-e Jonubi

Population (2016)
  - Total: 18
- Time zone: UTC+3:30 (IRST)

Qeshlaq-e Zargar (Persian: قشلاق زرگر) is a village in Darrehrud-e Jonubi Rural District of Darrehrud District in Ungut County, Ardabil province, Iran.

== Demographics ==
=== Population ===
The village did not appear in the 2006 National Census, when it was in Angut-e Gharbi Rural District of Ungut District (Note: Renamed the Central District of Ungut County) in Germi County. (Note: Formerly Moghan County) The following census in 2011 counted 25 people in six households. The 2016 census measured the population of the village as 18 people in four households.

In 2019, the district was separated from the county in the establishment of Ungut County and renamed the Central District. Qeshlaq-e Zargar was transferred to Darrehrud-e Jonubi Rural District created in the new Darrehrud District.
