= Qurtlu Qeshlaq =

Village in Ardabil province, Iran

Qurtlu Qeshlaq Persian: قورتلوقشلاق
- Village
- Location within Iran
- Coordinates: 39°09′59″N 47°34′45″E
- Country: Iran
- Province: Ardabil
- County: Ungut
- District: Darrehrud
- Rural District: Darrehrud-e Shomali

Population (2016)
  - Total: 24
- Time zone: UTC+3:30 (IRST)

Qurtlu Qeshlaq (Persian: قورتلوقشلاق) (Note: Also romanized as Qūrtlū Qeshlāq) is a village in Darrehrud-e Shomali Rural District of Darrehrud District in Ungut County, Ardabil province, Iran.

== Demographics ==
=== Population ===
At the time of the 2006 National Census, the village's population was 41 in seven households, when it was in Angut-e Gharbi Rural District of Ungut District (Note: Renamed the Central District of Ungut County) in Germi County. (Note: Formerly Moghan County) The following census in 2011 counted 29 people in eight households. The 2016 census measured the population of the village as 24 people in six households.

In 2019, the district was separated from the county in the establishment of Ungut County and renamed the Central District. Qurtlu Qeshlaq was transferred to Darrehrud-e Shomali Rural District created in the new Darrehrud District.
