= Aqa Mohammad Beyglu =

Village in Ardabil province, Iran

Aqa Mohammad Beyglu Persian: اقامحمد بيگلو
- Village
- Location within Iran
- Coordinates: 39°09′55″N 47°33′00″E
- Country: Iran
- Province: Ardabil
- County: Ungut
- District: Darrehrud
- Rural District: Darrehrud-e Shomali

Population (2016)
  - Total: 681
- Time zone: UTC+3:30 (IRST)

Aqa Mohammad Beyglu (Persian: اقامحمدبيگلو) (Note: Also romanized as Āqā Moḩammad Beyglū) is a village in, and the capital of, Darrehrud-e Shomali Rural District in Darrehrud District of Ungut County, Ardabil province, Iran.

== Demographics ==
=== Population ===
At the time of the 2006 National Census, the village's population was 764 in 157 households, when it was in Angut-e Gharbi Rural District of Ungut District (Note: Renamed the Central District of Ungut County) in Germi County. (Note: Formerly Moghan County) The following census in 2011 counted 803 people in 182 households. The 2016 census measured the population of the village as 681 people in 197 households.

In 2019, the district was separated from the county in the establishment of Ungut County and renamed the Central District. Aqa Mohammad Beyglu was transferred to Darrehrud-e Shomali Rural District created in the new Darrehrud District.
