= Qeshlaq-e Dowlama =

Village in Ardabil province, Iran

Qeshlaq-e Dowlama Persian: قشلاق دولاما
- Village
- Location within Iran
- Coordinates: 39°11′58″N 47°32′43″E
- Country: Iran
- Province: Ardabil
- County: Ungut
- District: Darrehrud
- Rural District: Darrehrud-e Shomali

Population (2016)
  - Total: 28
- Time zone: UTC+3:30 (IRST)

Qeshlaq-e Dowlama (Persian: قشلاق دولاما) (Note: Also romanized as Qeshlāq-e Dowlāmā) is a village in Darrehrud-e Shomali Rural District of Darrehrud District in Ungut County, Ardabil province, Iran.

== Demographics ==
=== Population ===
At the time of the 2006 National Census, the village's population was 29 in four households, when it was in Angut-e Gharbi Rural District of Ungut District (Note: Renamed the Central District of Ungut County) in Germi County. (Note: Formerly Moghan County) The following census in 2011 counted 63 people in 17 households. The 2016 census measured the population of the village as 28 people in seven households.

In 2019, the district was separated from the county in the establishment of Ungut County and renamed the Central District. Qeshlaq-e Dowlama was transferred to Darrehrud-e Shomali Rural District created in the new Darrehrud District.
