= Heybat =

Heybat (Persian: هيبت) may refer to:

- Heybət, Azerbaijan
- Heybat-e Olya, Iran
- Heybat-e Sofla, Iran
