= Quri Daraq =

Quri Daraq or Quri Doroq (Persian: قوري درق) may refer to:

- Quri Daraq, Ardabil
- Quri Daraq, alternate name of Qeshlaq-e Quzlu, Ardabil Province
- Quri Daraq, West Azerbaijan
