= Saluk Qeshlaqi =

Village in Ardabil province, Iran

Saluk Qeshlaqi Persian: سلوك قشلاقي
- Village
- Location within Iran
- Coordinates: 39°07′22″N 47°35′38″E
- Country: Iran
- Province: Ardabil
- County: Ungut
- District: Darrehrud
- Rural District: Darrehrud-e Shomali

Population (2016)
  - Total: 35
- Time zone: UTC+3:30 (IRST)

Saluk Qeshlaqi (Persian: سلوك قشلاقي) (Note: Also romanized as Salūk Qeshlāqī) is a village in Darrehrud-e Shomali Rural District of Darrehrud District in Ungut County, Ardabil province, Iran.

== Demographics ==
=== Population ===
At the time of the 2006 National Census, the village's population was 45 in nine households, when it was in Angut-e Gharbi Rural District of Ungut District (Note: Renamed the Central District of Ungut County) in Germi County. (Note: Formerly Moghan County) The following census in 2011 counted 20 people in seven households. The 2016 census measured the population of the village as 35 people in 10 households.

In 2019, the district was separated from the county in the establishment of Ungut County and renamed the Central District. Saluk Qeshlaqi was transferred to Darrehrud-e Shomali Rural District created in the new Darrehrud District.
