= Ali Qapu, Ardabil =

Village in Ardabil province, Iran

Ali Qapu Persian: عالي قاپو
- Village
- Location within Iran
- Coordinates: 39°07′53″N 47°33′02″E
- Country: Iran
- Province: Ardabil
- County: Ungut
- District: Darrehrud
- Rural District: Darrehrud-e Shomali

Population (2016)
  - Total: 119
- Time zone: UTC+3:30 (IRST)

Ali Qapu (Persian: عالي قاپو) (Note: Also romanized as ‘Ālī Qāpū) is a village in Darrehrud-e Shomali Rural District of Darrehrud District in Ungut County, Ardabil province, Iran.

== Demographics ==
=== Population ===
At the time of the 2006 National Census, the village's population was 122 in 20 households, when it was in Angut-e Gharbi Rural District of Ungut District (Note: Renamed the Central District of Ungut County) in Germi County. (Note: Formerly Moghan County) The following census in 2011 counted 123 people in 25 households. The 2016 census measured the population of the village as 119 people in 26 households.

In 2019, the district was separated from the county in the establishment of Ungut County and renamed the Central District. Ali Qapu was transferred to Darrehrud-e Shomali Rural District created in the new Darrehrud District.

== See also ==
- Ali Qapu (Tabriz)
