= Gotul =

Gotul may refer to:

- Gotul, the dormitory institution among the Gondi people
- Quytul (disambiguation)
