= Delik Yarqan =

Village in Ardabil province, Iran

Delik Yarqan Persian: دليكيارقان
- Village
- Location within Iran
- Coordinates: 39°07′01″N 47°32′46″E
- Country: Iran
- Province: Ardabil
- County: Ungut
- District: Darrehrud
- Rural District: Darrehrud-e Shomali

Population (2016)
  - Total: 42
- Time zone: UTC+3:30 (IRST)

Delik Yarqan (Persian: دليكيارقان) (Note: Also romanized as Delīk Yārqān) is a village in Darrehrud-e Shomali Rural District of Darrehrud District in Ungut County, Ardabil province, Iran.

== Demographics ==
=== Population ===
At the time of the 2006 National Census, the village's population was 53 in 12 households, when it was in Angut-e Gharbi Rural District of Ungut District (Note: Renamed the Central District of Ungut County) in Germi County. (Note: Formerly Moghan County) The following census in 2011 counted 46 people in 13 households. The 2016 census measured the population of the village as 42 people in 14 households.

In 2019, the district was separated from the county in the establishment of Ungut County and renamed the Central District. Delik Yarqan was transferred to Darrehrud-e Shomali Rural District created in the new Darrehrud District.
