= Chat Qeshlaq-e Bala =

Village in Ardabil province, Iran

Chat Qeshlaq-e Bala Persian: چات قشلاق بالا
- Village
- Location within Iran
- Coordinates: 39°08′40″N 47°43′49″E
- Country: Iran
- Province: Ardabil
- County: Ungut
- District: Darrehrud
- Rural District: Darrehrud-e Jonubi

Population (2016)
  - Total: 125
- Time zone: UTC+3:30 (IRST)

Chat Qeshlaq-e Bala (Persian: چات قشلاق بالا) (Note: Also romanized as Chāt Qeshlāq-e Bālā; also known as Chād Qeshlāq and Chāt Qeshlāq) is a village in Darrehrud-e Jonubi Rural District of Darrehrud District in Ungut County, Ardabil province, Iran.

== Demographics ==
=== Population ===
At the time of the 2006 National Census, the village's population was 97 in 18 households, when it was in Angut-e Sharqi Rural District of Ungut District (Note: Renamed the Central District of Ungut County) in Germi County. (Note: Formerly Moghan County) The following census in 2011 counted 131 people in 28 households. The 2016 census measured the population of the village as 125 people in 40 households.

In 2019, the district was separated from the county in the establishment of Ungut County and renamed the Central District. Chat Qeshlaq-e Bala was transferred to Darrehrud-e Jonubi Rural District created in the new Darrehrud District.
