= Jamulu Kandi =

Village in Ardabil province, Iran

Jamulu Kandi Persian: جمولو كندي
- Village
- Location within Iran
- Coordinates: 39°06′56″N 47°42′09″E
- Country: Iran
- Province: Ardabil
- County: Ungut
- District: Darrehrud
- Rural District: Darrehrud-e Jonubi

Population (2016)
  - Total: 105
- Time zone: UTC+3:30 (IRST)

Jamulu Kandi (Persian: جمولو كندي) (Note: Also romanized as Jamūlū Kandī; also known as Jamlū (جملو), Jom‘ehlū, and Jūmīlū) is a village in Darrehrud-e Jonubi Rural District of Darrehrud District in Ungut County, Ardabil province, Iran.

== Demographics ==
=== Population ===
At the time of the 2006 National Census, the village's population was 142 in 32 households, when it was in Angut-e Sharqi Rural District of Ungut District (Note: Renamed the Central District of Ungut County) in Germi County. (Note: Formerly Moghan County) The following census in 2011 counted 144 people in 36 households. The 2016 census measured the population of the village as 105 people in 37 households.

In 2019, the district was separated from the county in the establishment of Ungut County and renamed the Central District. Jamulu Kandi was transferred to Darrehrud-e Jonubi Rural District created in the new Darrehrud District.
