= Gechi Qeshlaq Amirlu =

Village in Ardabil province, Iran

Gechi Qeshlaq Amirlu Persian: گچي قشلاق اميرلو
- Village
- Location within Iran
- Coordinates: 39°12′53″N 47°31′47″E
- Country: Iran
- Province: Ardabil
- County: Ungut
- District: Darrehrud
- Rural District: Darrehrud-e Shomali

Population (2016)
  - Total: 145
- Time zone: UTC+3:30 (IRST)

Gechi Qeshlaq Amirlu (Persian: گچي قشلاق اميرلو) (Note: Also romanized as Gechī Qeshlāq Amīrlū) is a village in Darrehrud-e Shomali Rural District of Darrehrud District in Ungut County, Ardabil province, Iran.

== Demographics ==
=== Population ===
At the time of the 2006 National Census, the village's population was 54 in 12 households, when it was in Angut-e Gharbi Rural District of Ungut District (Note: Renamed the Central District of Ungut County) in Germi County. (Note: Formerly Moghan County) The following census in 2011 counted 46 people in nine households. The 2016 census measured the population of the village as 62 people in 15 households.

In 2019, the district was separated from the county in the establishment of Ungut County and renamed the Central District. Gechi Qeshlaq Amirlu was transferred to Darrehrud-e Shomali Rural District created in the new Darrehrud District.
