= Qeshlaq-e Aba =

Village in Ardabil province, Iran

Qeshlaq-e Aba Persian: قشلاق عبا
- Village
- Location within Iran
- Coordinates: 39°09′19″N 47°41′23″E
- Country: Iran
- Province: Ardabil
- County: Ungut
- District: Darrehrud
- Rural District: Darrehrud-e Shomali

Population (2016)
  - Total: 111
- Time zone: UTC+3:30 (IRST)

Qeshlaq-e Aba (Persian: قشلاق عبا) (Note: Also romanized as Qeshlāq-e ‘Abā; also known as ‘Abā Qeshlāqī) is a village in Darrehrud-e Shomali Rural District of Darrehrud District in Ungut County, Ardabil province, Iran.

== Demographics ==
=== Population ===
At the time of the 2006 National Census, the village's population was 161 in 36 households, when it was in Angut-e Sharqi Rural District of Ungut District (Note: Renamed the Central District of Ungut County) in Germi County. (Note: Formerly Moghan County) The following census in 2011 counted 115 people in 26 households. The 2016 census measured the population of the village as 111 people in 35 households.

In 2019, the district was separated from the county in the establishment of Ungut County and renamed the Central District. Qeshlaq-e Aba was transferred to Darrehrud-e Shomali Rural District created in the new Darrehrud District.
