= Lakarabad-e Sofla =

Village in Ardabil province, Iran

Lakarabad-e Sofla Persian: لكرابادسفلي
- Village
- Location within Iran
- Coordinates: 39°02′14″N 47°36′50″E
- Country: Iran
- Province: Ardabil
- County: Ungut
- District: Darrehrud
- Rural District: Darrehrud-e Jonubi

Population (2016)
  - Total: 134
- Time zone: UTC+3:30 (IRST)

Lakarabad-e Sofla (Persian: لكرابادسفلي) (Note: Also romanized as Lakarābād-e Soflá; also known as Lakarābād-e Pā'īn) is a village in Darrehrud-e Jonubi Rural District of Darrehrud District in Ungut County, Ardabil province, Iran.

== Demographics ==
=== Population ===
At the time of the 2006 National Census, the village's population was 195 in 38 households, when it was in Angut-e Gharbi Rural District of Ungut District (Note: Renamed the Central District of Ungut County) in Germi County. (Note: Formerly Moghan County) The following census in 2011 counted 143 people in 31 households. The 2016 census measured the population of the village as 134 people in 32 households.

In 2019, the district was separated from the county in the establishment of Ungut County and renamed the Central District. Lakarabad-e Sofla was transferred to Darrehrud-e Jonubi Rural District created in the new Darrehrud District.
