= Qeshlaq-e Chortaqlu =

Village in Ardabil province, Iran

Qeshlaq-e Chortaqlu Persian: قشلاق چرتقلو
- Village
- Location within Iran
- Country: Iran
- Province: Ardabil
- County: Ungut
- District: Darrehrud
- Rural District: Darrehrud-e Jonubi

Population (2016)
  - Total: 149
- Time zone: UTC+3:30 (IRST)

Qeshlaq-e Chortaqlu (Persian: قشلاق چرتقلو) (Note: Also romanized as Qeshlāq-e Chortaqlū) is a village in Darrehrud-e Jonubi Rural District of Darrehrud District in Ungut County, Ardabil province, Iran.

== Demographics ==
=== Population ===
At the time of the 2006 National Census, the village's population was 140 in 25 households, when it was in Angut-e Sharqi Rural District of Ungut District (Note: Renamed the Central District of Ungut County) in Germi County. (Note: Formerly Moghan County) The following census in 2011 counted 135 people in 33 households. The 2016 census measured the population of the village as 149 people in 40 households.

In 2019, the district was separated from the county in the establishment of Ungut County and renamed the Central District. Qeshlaq-e Chortaqlu was transferred to Darrehrud-e Jonubi Rural District created in the new Darrehrud District.
