= Kinu =

Kinu or KINU may refer to:

== People with the given name ==
- Kinu Malla, was the fourth king of the Mallabhum
- Kinu Nishimura (西村 キヌ; born 1969), Japanese video game and anime concept artist and illustrator
- Kinu Rochford, (1990) American professional basketball player

== Fictional characters ==
- Kinu Kanisawa (蟹沢きぬ), one of the characters of the series Tsuyokiss
- Kinu Tanukikōji (狸小路 絹), one of the characters of the series My Deer Friend Nokotan

== Places ==
- Kinu-gawa, a river in Japan
- Kinu, a village in Iran
- KINU (FM), a radio station (89.9 FM) licensed to serve Kotzebue, Alaska, United States

== Other uses ==
- Kinu, a warship in the Imperial Japanese Navy
