= Lakarabad-e Olya =

Village in Ardabil province, Iran

Lakarabad-e Olya Persian: لكرابادعليا
- Village
- Location within Iran
- Coordinates: 39°01′39″N 47°37′27″E
- Country: Iran
- Province: Ardabil
- County: Ungut
- District: Darrehrud
- Rural District: Darrehrud-e Jonubi

Population (2016)
  - Total: 145
- Time zone: UTC+3:30 (IRST)

Lakarabad-e Olya (Persian: لكرابادعليا) (Note: Also romanized as Lakarābād-e ‘Olyā; also known as Lakarābād-e Bālā) is a village in Darrehrud-e Jonubi Rural District of Darrehrud District in Ungut County, Ardabil province, Iran.

== Demographics ==
=== Population ===
At the time of the 2006 National Census, the village's population was 206 in 37 households, when it was in Angut-e Gharbi Rural District of Ungut District (Note: Renamed the Central District of Ungut County) in Germi County. (Note: Formerly Moghan County) The following census in 2011 counted 206 people in 52 households. The 2016 census measured the population of the village as 145 people in 45 households.

In 2019, the district was separated from the county in the establishment of Ungut County and renamed the Central District. Lakarabad-e Olya was transferred to Darrehrud-e Jonubi Rural District created in the new Darrehrud District.
