= Bagheshlu, Ardabil =

Village in Ardabil province, Iran

Bagheshlu Persian: باغشلو
- Village
- Location within Iran
- Coordinates: 39°09′35″N 47°35′40″E
- Country: Iran
- Province: Ardabil
- County: Ungut
- District: Darrehrud
- Rural District: Darrehrud-e Shomali

Population (2016)
  - Total: 168
- Time zone: UTC+3:30 (IRST)

Bagheshlu (Persian: باغشلو) (Note: Also romanized as Bāgheshlū) is a village in Darrehrud-e Shomali Rural District of Darrehrud District in Ungut County, Ardabil province, Iran.

== Demographics ==
=== Population ===
At the time of the 2006 National Census, the village's population was 234 in 40 households, when it was in Angut-e Gharbi Rural District of Ungut District (Note: Renamed the Central District of Ungut County) in Germi County. (Note: Formerly Moghan County) The following census in 2011 counted 195 people in 39 households. The 2016 census measured the population of the village as 168 people in 44 households.

In 2019, the district was separated from the county in the establishment of Ungut County and renamed the Central District. Bagheshlu was transferred to Darrehrud-e Shomali Rural District created in the new Darrehrud District.
