= Lachin Darrehsi =

Village in Ardabil province, Iran

Lachin Darrehsi Persian: لاچين دره سي
- Village
- Location within Iran
- Coordinates: 38°54′57″N 47°43′18″E
- Country: Iran
- Province: Ardabil
- County: Ungut
- District: Central
- Rural District: Angut-e Gharbi

Population (2016)
  - Total: 53
- Time zone: UTC+3:30 (IRST)

Lachin Darrehsi (Persian: لاچين دره سي) (Note: Also romanized as Lachīn Darrahsī and Lāchīn Darrehsī) is a village in Angut-e Gharbi Rural District of the Central District (Note: Formerly Ungut District of Germi County) in Ungut County, Ardabil province, Iran.

== Demographics ==
=== Population ===
At the time of the 2006 National Census, the village's population was 144 in 33 households, when it was in Ungut District (Note: Renamed the Central District of Ungut County) of Germi County. (Note: Formerly Moghan County) The following census in 2011 counted 86 people in 21 households. The 2016 census measured the population of the village as 53 people in 21 households.

In 2019, the district was separated from the county in the establishment of Ungut County and renamed the Central District.
