= Shurestan, Ardabil =

Village in Ardabil province, Iran

Shurestan Persian: شورستان
- Village
- Location within Iran
- Coordinates: 39°00′18″N 47°31′24″E
- Country: Iran
- Province: Ardabil
- County: Ungut
- District: Central
- Rural District: Angut-e Gharbi

Population (2016)
  - Total: 111
- Time zone: UTC+3:30 (IRST)

Shurestan (Persian: شورستان) (Note: Also romanized as Shūrestān) is a village in Angut-e Gharbi Rural District of the Central District (Note: Formerly Ungut District of Germi County) in Ungut County, Ardabil province, Iran.

== Demographics ==
=== Population ===
At the time of the 2006 National Census, the village's population was 111 in 23 households, when it was in Ungut District (Note: Renamed the Central District of Ungut County) of Germi County. (Note: Formerly Moghan County) The following census in 2011 counted 100 people in 25 households. The 2016 census measured the population of the village as 111 people in 34 households.

In 2019, the district was separated from the county in the establishment of Ungut County and renamed the Central District.
