= Quzlu, Ungut =

Village in Ardabil province, Iran

Quzlu Persian: قوزلو
- Village
- Location within Iran
- Coordinates: 38°57′19″N 47°44′57″E
- Country: Iran
- Province: Ardabil
- County: Ungut
- District: Central
- Rural District: Angut-e Gharbi

Population (2016)
  - Total: 46
- Time zone: UTC+3:30 (IRST)

Quzlu (Persian: قوزلو) (Note: Also romanized as Qūzlū) is a village in Angut-e Gharbi Rural District of the Central District (Note: Formerly Ungut District of Germi County) in Ungut County, Ardabil province, Iran.

== Demographics ==
=== Population ===
At the time of the 2006 National Census, the village's population was 99 in 22 households, when it was in Ungut District (Note: Renamed the Central District of Ungut County) of Germi County. (Note: Formerly Moghan County) The following census in 2011 counted 79 people in 18 households. The 2016 census measured the population of the village as 46 people in 12 households.

In 2019, the district was separated from the county in the establishment of Ungut County and renamed the Central District.
