= Ziveh, Ungut =

Village in Ardabil province, Iran

Ziveh Persian: زيوه
- Village
- Location within Iran
- Coordinates: 39°07′20″N 47°38′56″E
- Country: Iran
- Province: Ardabil
- County: Ungut
- District: Darrehrud
- Rural District: Darrehrud-e Jonubi

Population (2016)
  - Total: 1,412
- Time zone: UTC+3:30 (IRST)

Ziveh (Persian: زيوه) (Note: Also romanized as Zīveh) is a village in Darrehrud-e Jonubi Rural District of Darrehrud District in Ungut County, Ardabil province, Iran, serving as capital of the district.

== Demographics ==
=== Population ===
At the time of the 2006 National Census, the village's population was 1,130 in 240 households, when it was in Angut-e Gharbi Rural District of Ungut District (Note: Renamed the Central District of Ungut County) in Germi County. (Note: Formerly Moghan County) The following census in 2011 counted 1,425 people in 336 households. The 2016 census measured the population of the village as 1,412 people in 375 households. It was the most populous village in its rural district.

In 2019, the district was separated from the county in the establishment of Ungut County and renamed the Central District. Ziveh was transferred to Darrehrud-e Jonubi Rural District created in the new Darrehrud District.
