= Ali Qapu (Tabriz) =

Destroyed palace in Tabriz, Iran

Ali Qapu Persian: عالی قاپو
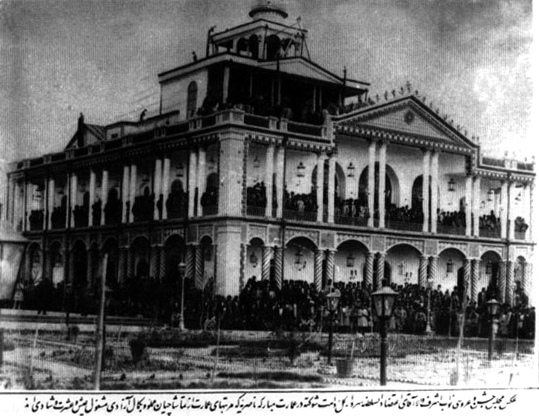
- Shams-ol-Emareh just after construction, 19th century.

- Location within Iran
- Coordinates: 38°4′43.5″N 46°17′51.0″E
- Country: Iran
- Province: Tabriz

Ali Qapu (Persian: عالی‌ قاپو) Ala Qapu was a palace complex in Tabriz which was initially built in the 16th century, during the Safavid era. The palace was entirely reconstructed in the 19th century, during the Qajar era, when a Qajar- style neoclassical building, named Shams-ol-Emareh, was constructed with its four stories, crowned by a pediment and a dome.

In the 1940s, following a period of neglect, the palace was demolished during the Pahlavi era. It was a tall pavilion-type building located in central Tabriz, near today's Martyrs’ Square. After its destruction, the large area it had occupied was used for the construction of the East Azerbaijan Governor's Office, alongside the Tabriz Municipality building and the Central National Bank's branch complex.

== Etymology ==
Two theories exist concerning the origin of the palace's name:

- During the Safavid era, in the context of rivalry with the Ottoman Empire, the Ottomans referred to the residence of their sovereign as "Bâb-ı Âli" ("Sublime Porte," literally "Grand Gate"). The Safavid shahs, in turn, ordered that the palace in Tabriz be named "Ali Qapu." The term "Ali" may derive either from the Azerbaijani Turkic word ulu/ala meaning "great" or "grand," or from the Arabic-origin word "ali" meaning "exalted" or "supreme."
- According to another theory, "Ali Qapu" was in fact "Ala Qapu," meaning "colored gate" or "red gate," since "ala" in Azerbaijani Turkic denotes “red.”

== History ==
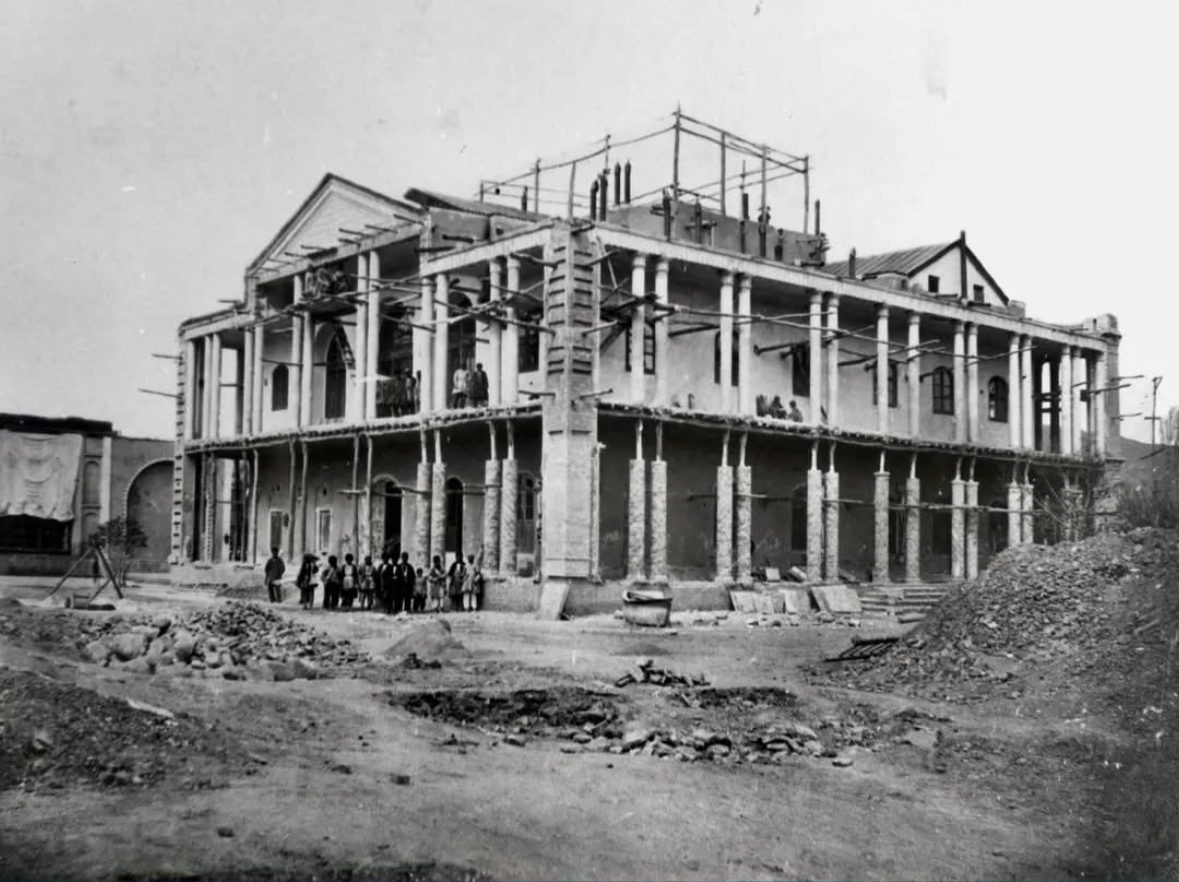
Shams-ol-Emareh during construction.

Some researchers maintain that the Ali Qapu Palace in Isfahan was constructed on the model of the one that had already existed in Tabriz. The building was already standing during the reign of Shah Abbas I. When Abbas Mirza was crown prince, the palace became the residence of Qajar princes and became widely known as "Ali Qapu." During the reign of Naser al-Din Shah, influenced by Tehran’s Shams-ol-Emareh, the building was renamed "Shams-ol-Emareh". In the reign of Mozaffar al-Din Shah, major renovation works were undertaken, and on the northern side of the garden, a harem building was constructed.

In the Qajar era, the Ali Qapu garden held special significance during Ashura ceremonies. It was the site of chest-beating and sword-striking rituals, and the crown prince would present shawls to the leaders of the mourning processions. This was also the place where the renowned vocalist Abul-Hasan Khan Eqbali Azar became famous for his powerful performances during Muharram ceremonies. Ali Qapu had three main gates: the first for the use of Qajar crown princes and state officials; the second, on the eastern side, for public access, particularly for those attending Muharram rituals; and the third, the harem gate, reserved for members of the royal family and close associates of the crown prince.

== Architectural features ==
The Ali Qapu Palace, with its multiple floors, halls, original design, and architecture, was among the most unique buildings of its time. Its mirror-decorated walls and large reception halls for distinguished guests were notable features. The artists and architects of the period designed the palace with great care and refinement, using marble to give it a grandeur befitting royal authority. The interior decorations were remarkable for their seven-colored tiles and bricks, as well as rare stucco ornamentation applied on the ceilings. Rich in animal and floral motifs, much of this artistic work was executed by the famous painter Reza Abbasi, to whom most of the decorations are attributed.

On the western side of the palace were two symmetrical spiral staircases. In addition, there existed a special "royal staircase" designated exclusively for the shah and his close circle. Outside, a relatively large copper pool was situated, further enhancing the aesthetic beauty of the building. The palace revealed different architectural appearances depending on the perspective: from the front, it appeared as a two- or three-storied structure, while from the rear it seemed one-storied, although in reality the Ali Qapu had four floors.

=== Music hall ===
The Music Hall or Sound Room was located on the top floor of the palace. Its central space measured 63 square meters and was built in a cruciform plan, with walls decorated with paintings. The hall was adorned with stucco reliefs in the form of vessels and decorative motifs. The artisans of the time created rare ornaments, reliefs, and decorative designs characterized by complex forms and delicate recesses, giving them high artistic value. Fred Richards, one of the well-known painters of the era, described the ornamentation of the Music Hall as follows:

...these indentations are arranged side by side in a peculiar order, resembling pieces of a puzzle.

=== Harem-khaneh quarter ===
In earlier times, the northern gate of the harem section of the Ali Qapu Palace opened into what is now known as Haremkhaneh Street. This area included shops belonging to Majid al-Molk, the Baghmisha Gate, and the Omar shops. The residents of Haremkhaneh Street were mainly merchants and scholars; indeed, it was considered a residential area for the city's aristocracy. The street also served as one of the favored promenades of Tabriz's inhabitants.

At present, the Shoemakers’ Bazaar (Koshakchilar in Azerbaijani Turkic) is located in the eastern part of this street up to the provincial governor's office. During the Qajar era, Haremkhaneh Street was one of the city's important centers. However, in the Pahlavi era, with the construction of provincial and municipal administration buildings, much of this historic area disappeared. Later municipal works resulted in the near-total destruction of the street. Nader Mirza Qajar, in his work Tarikh va Joghrafiya-yi Dar al-Saltanah-yi Tabriz, also referred to this street.

In 1969, the Haram-khaneh building was demolished to make way for the construction of the governor’s office. This decision drew criticism from local residents, who condemned the authorities for disregarding the city’s heritage and allowing its historical landmarks to be lost.

== Demolition ==
After the fall of the Qajar dynasty, the Ali Qapu complex became the residence of the governors of Azerbaijan. In 1933, during the governorship of Adib al-Saltaneh Sami, a fire broke out, destroying the upper parts of the building and its dome, which had been a rare example of Zand and Qajar architecture. The event caused deep sorrow among the people, and a popular song of the time was dedicated to this tragedy. Public opinion widely suspected the fire had been deliberately set.

In 1934, a severe flood further damaged the building, causing several arches to collapse. In 1947, Governor Ali Mansur ordered the demolition of the remaining structure, initiating the construction of the new Governor's Office on the site, completed in 1954. During this process, the palace's rare centuries-old trees were also cut down. Like his predecessor Adib al-Saltaneh Sami, Ali Mansur was strongly criticized by the public for destroying such a beautiful historical monument.

Later, the Central National Bank building was constructed on the western side of the former Ali Qapu site, adjacent to the Governor's Office. In 1969, the harem building was demolished, and the current municipal headquarters was built in its place.

== Gallery ==
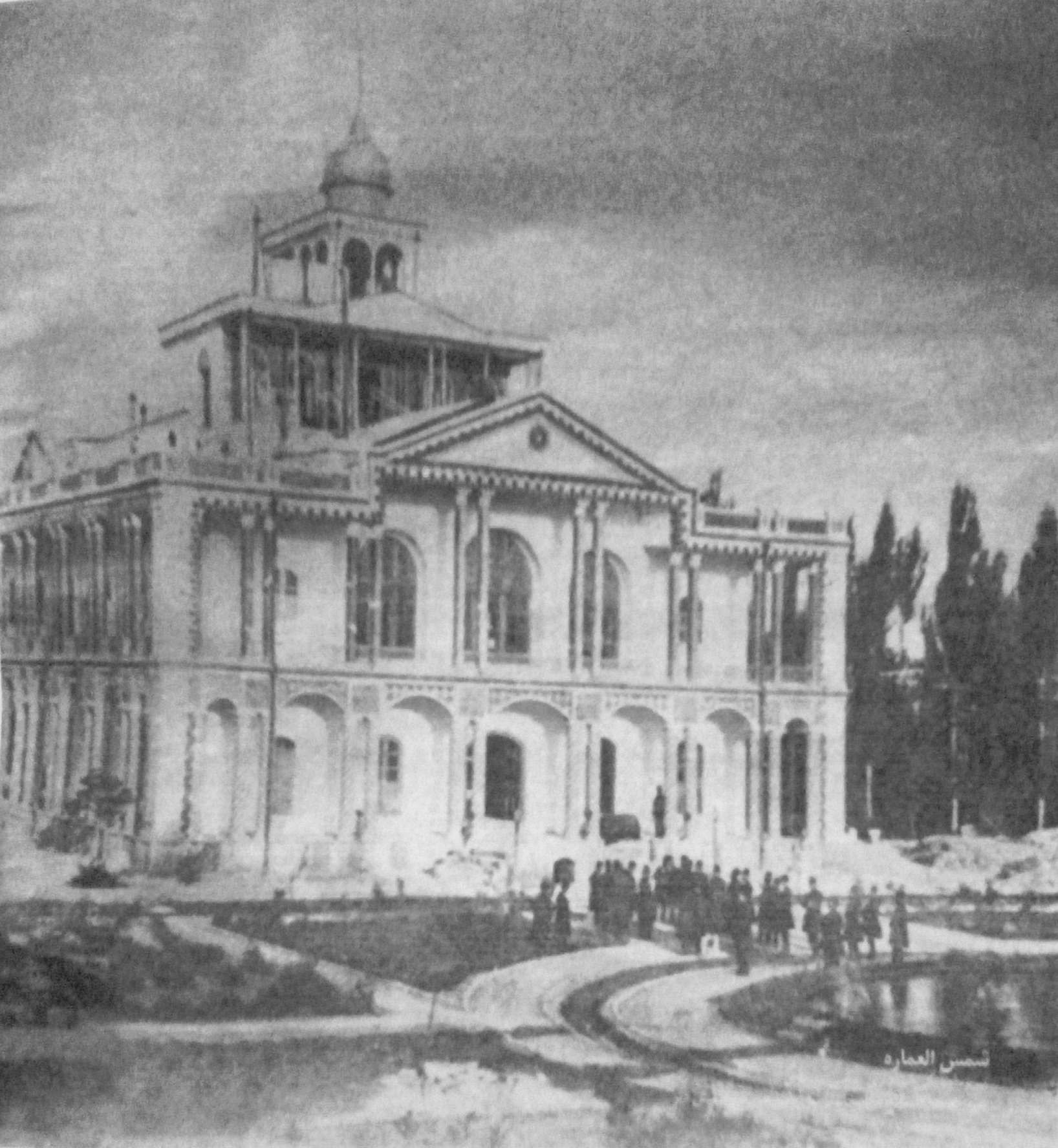

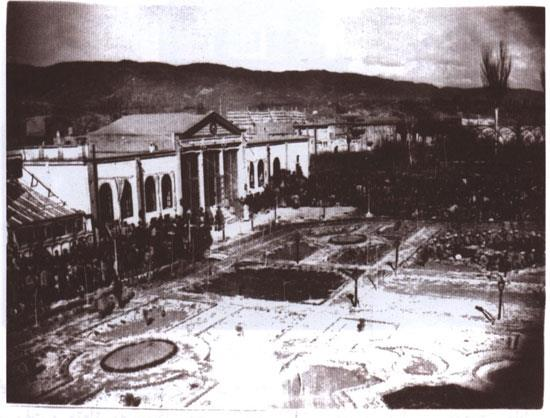

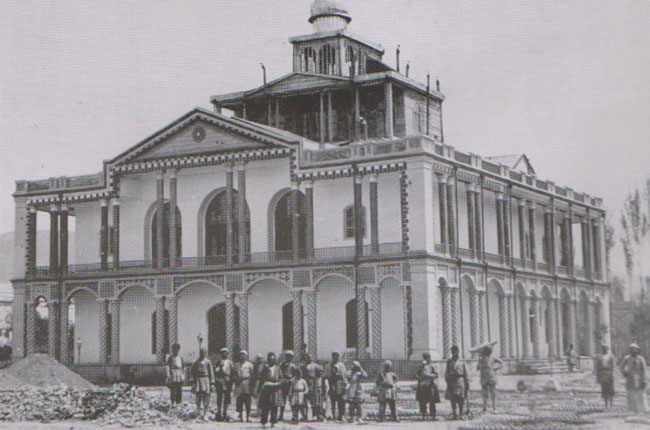

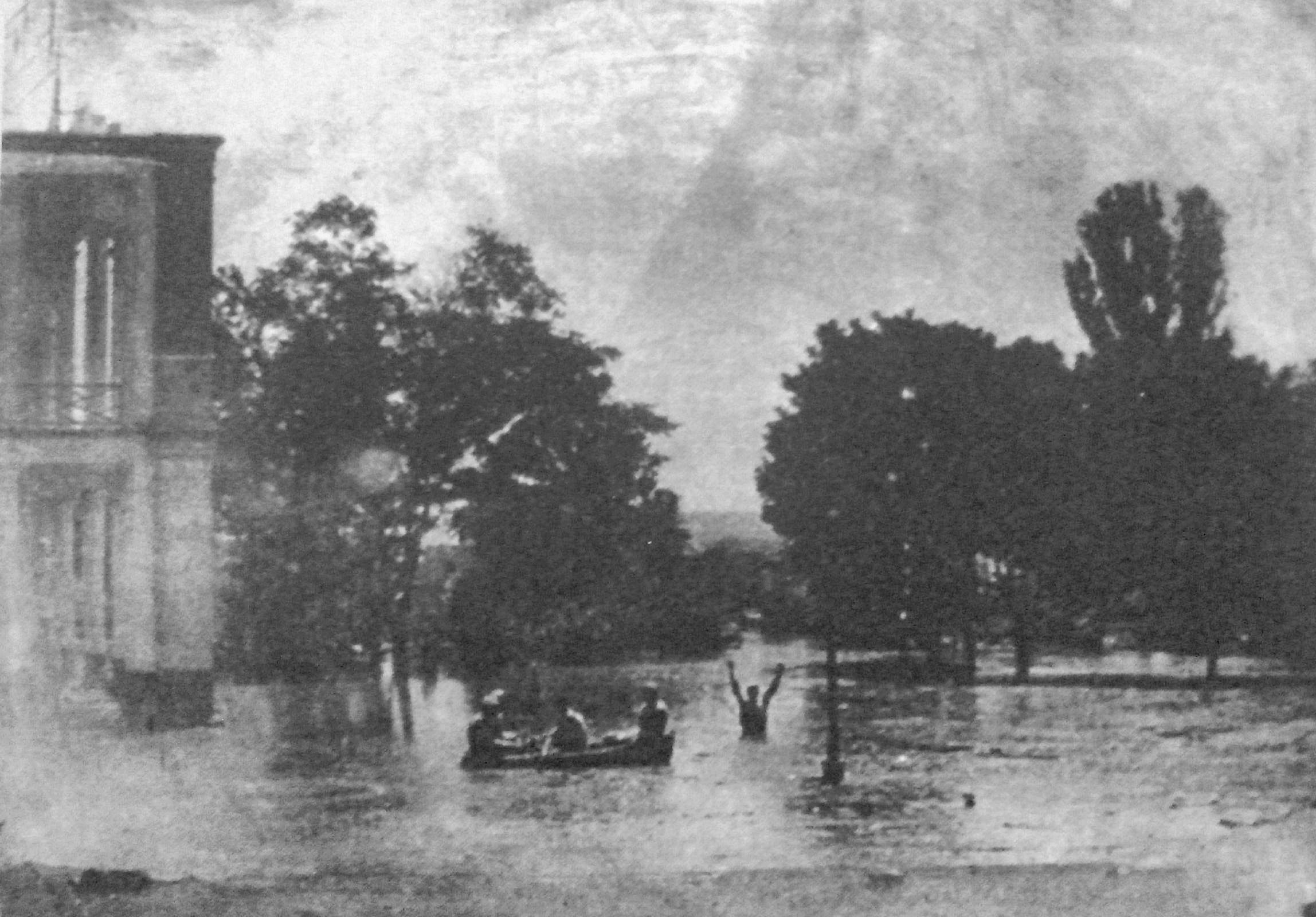
The palace garden submerged by floods. 1934.

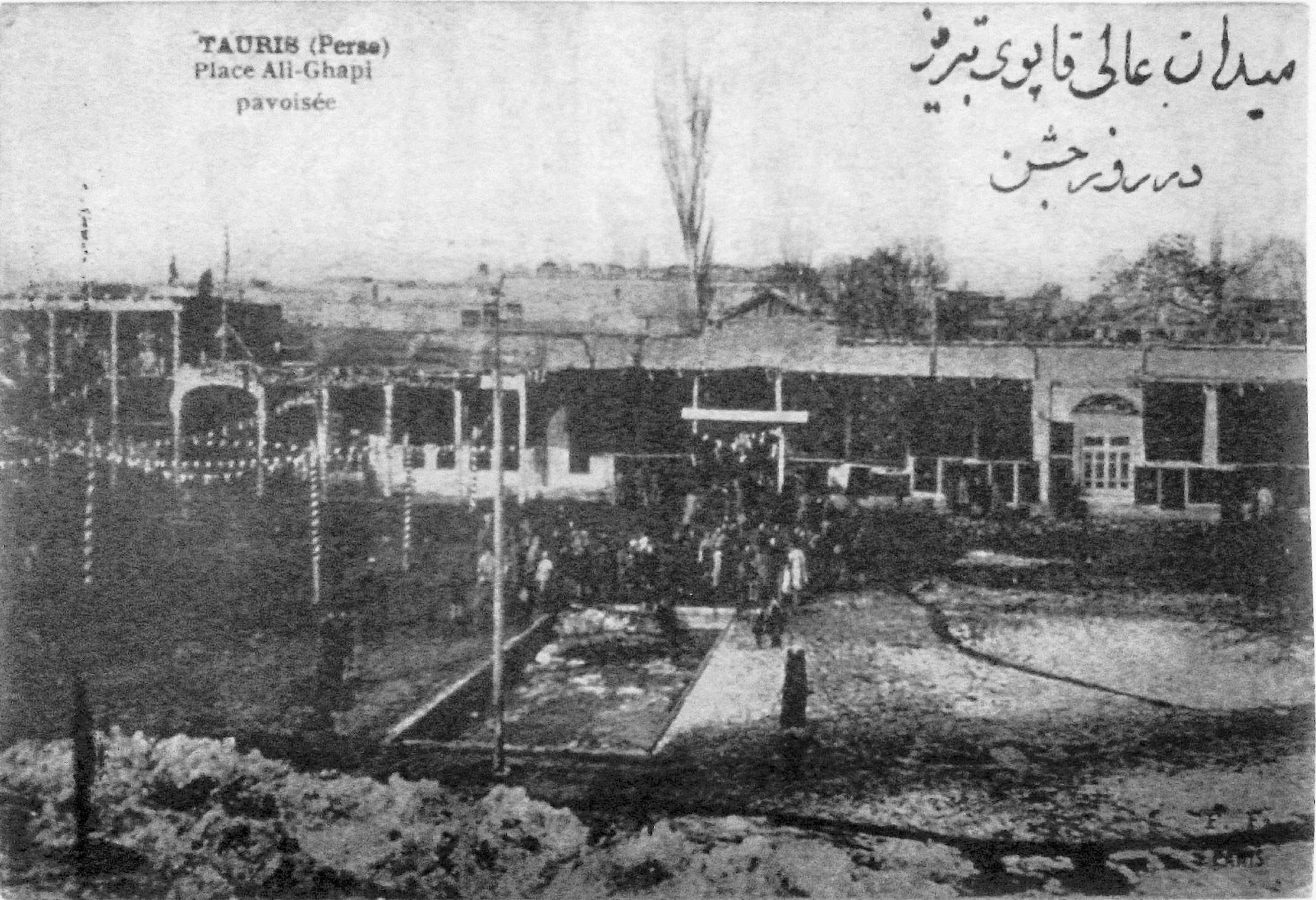

== See also ==
- Ali Qapu, Ardabil
