= Kalantar, Ardabil =

Village in Ardabil province, Iran

Kalantar Persian: كلانتر
- Village
- Location within Iran
- Coordinates: 38°53′46″N 47°40′11″E
- Country: Iran
- Province: Ardabil
- County: Ungut
- District: Central
- Rural District: Angut-e Gharbi

Population (2016)
  - Total: 103
- Time zone: UTC+3:30 (IRST)

Kalantar (Persian: كلانتر) (Note: Also romanized as Kalāntar) is a village in Angut-e Gharbi Rural District of the Central District (Note: Formerly Ungut District of Germi County) in Ungut County, Ardabil province, Iran.

== Demographics ==
=== Population ===
At the time of the 2006 National Census, the village's population was 129 in 25 households, when it was in Ungut District (Note: Renamed the Central District of Ungut County) of Germi County. (Note: Formerly Moghan County) The following census in 2011 counted 116 people in 29 households. The 2016 census measured the population of the village as 103 people in 33 households.

In 2019, the district was separated from the county in the establishment of Ungut County and renamed the Central District.
