= Allah Yarlu =

Village in Ardabil province, Iran

Allah Yarlu Persian: اللهيارلو
- Village
- Location within Iran
- Coordinates: 38°55′34″N 47°44′58″E
- Country: Iran
- Province: Ardabil
- County: Ungut
- District: Central
- Rural District: Angut-e Gharbi

Population (2016)
  - Total: 65
- Time zone: UTC+3:30 (IRST)

Allah Yarlu (Persian: اللهيارلو) (Note: Also romanized as Allāh Yārlū) is a village in Angut-e Gharbi Rural District of the Central District (Note: Formerly Ungut District of Germi County) in Ungut County, Ardabil province, Iran.

== Demographics ==
=== Population ===
At the time of the 2006 National Census, the village's population was 93 in 17 households, when it was in Ungut District (Note: Renamed the Central District of Ungut County) of Germi County. (Note: Formerly Moghan County) The following census in 2011 counted 64 people in 13 households. The 2016 census measured the population of the village as 65 people in 18 households.

In 2019, the district was separated from the county in the establishment of Ungut County and renamed the Central District.
