= Galin Bolaghi =

Village in Ardabil province, Iran

Galin Bolaghi Persian: گلين بلاغي
- Village
- Location within Iran
- Coordinates: 38°54′15″N 47°38′58″E
- Country: Iran
- Province: Ardabil
- County: Ungut
- District: Central
- Rural District: Angut-e Gharbi

Population (2016)
  - Total: 56
- Time zone: UTC+3:30 (IRST)

Galin Bolaghi (Persian: گلين بلاغي) (Note: Also romanized as Galīn Bolāghī) is a village in Angut-e Gharbi Rural District of the Central District (Note: Formerly Ungut District of Germi County) in Ungut County, Ardabil province, Iran.

== Demographics ==
=== Population ===
At the time of the 2006 National Census, the village's population was 67 in 14 households, when it was in Ungut District (Note: Renamed the Central District of Ungut County) of Germi County. (Note: Formerly Moghan County) The following census in 2011 counted 58 people in 13 households. The 2016 census measured the population of the village as 56 people in 14 households.

In 2019, the district was separated from the county in the establishment of Ungut County and renamed the Central District.
