= Anjirlu, Ungut =

Village in Ardabil province, Iran

Anjirlu Persian: انجيرلو
- Village
- Location within Iran
- Coordinates: 38°57′07″N 47°33′12″E
- Country: Iran
- Province: Ardabil
- County: Ungut
- District: Central
- Rural District: Angut-e Gharbi

Population (2016)
  - Total: 0
- Time zone: UTC+3:30 (IRST)

Anjirlu (Persian: انجيرلو) (Note: Also romanized as Anjīrlū) is a village in Angut-e Gharbi Rural District, of the Central District (Note: Formerly Ungut District of Germi County) in Ungut County, Ardabil province, Iran.

== Demographics ==
=== Population ===
At the time of the 2006 National Census, the village's population was 19 in four households, when it was in Ungut District (Note: Renamed the Central District of Ungut County) of Germi County. (Note: Formerly Moghan County) The following census in 2011 counted a population below the reporting threshold. The 2016 census measured the population of the village as zero.

In 2019, the district was separated from the county in the establishment of Ungut County and renamed the Central District.
