= Seyyed Mohammadlu =

Village in Ardabil province, Iran

Seyyed Mohammadlu Persian: سيدمحمدلو
- Village
- Location within Iran
- Coordinates: 38°56′24″N 47°42′28″E
- Country: Iran
- Province: Ardabil
- County: Ungut
- District: Central
- Rural District: Angut-e Gharbi

Population (2016)
  - Total: 32
- Time zone: UTC+3:30 (IRST)

Seyyed Mohammadlu (Persian: سيدمحمدلو) (Note: Also romanized as Seyyed Moḩammadlū; also known as Seyyed Moḩammadī) is a village in Angut-e Gharbi Rural District of the Central District (Note: Formerly Ungut District of Germi County) in Ungut County, Ardabil province, Iran.

== Demographics ==
=== Population ===
At the time of the 2006 National Census, the village's population was 100 in 21 households, when it was in Ungut District (Note: Renamed the Central District of Ungut County) of Germi County. (Note: Formerly Moghan County) The following census in 2011 counted 56 people in 12 households. The 2016 census measured the population of the village as 32 people in eight households.

In 2019, the district was separated from the county in the establishment of Ungut County and renamed the Central District.
