= Zaviyeh Sang =

Village in Ardabil province, Iran

Zaviyeh Sang Persian: زاويه سنگ
- Village
- Location within Iran
- Coordinates: 38°53′06″N 47°34′32″E
- Country: Iran
- Province: Ardabil
- County: Ungut
- District: Central
- Rural District: Angut-e Gharbi

Population (2016)
  - Total: 248
- Time zone: UTC+3:30 (IRST)

Zaviyeh Sang (Persian: زاويه سنگ) (Note: Also romanized as Zāvīyeh Sang) is a village in Angut-e Gharbi Rural District of the Central District (Note: Formerly Ungut District of Germi County) in Ungut County, Ardabil province, Iran.

== Demographics ==
=== Population ===
At the time of the 2006 National Census, the village's population was 385 in 66 households, when it was in Ungut District (Note: Renamed the Central District of Ungut County) of Germi County. (Note: Formerly Moghan County) The following census in 2011 counted 274 people in 85 households. The 2016 census measured the population of the village as 248 people in 72 households.

In 2019, the district was separated from the county in the establishment of Ungut County and renamed the Central District.
