= Guni Kand =

Village in Ardabil province, Iran

Guni Kand Persian: گوني كند
- Village
- Location within Iran
- Coordinates: 38°57′34″N 47°43′26″E
- Country: Iran
- Province: Ardabil
- County: Ungut
- District: Central
- Rural District: Angut-e Gharbi

Population (2016)
  - Total: 82
- Time zone: UTC+3:30 (IRST)

Guni Kand (Persian: گوني كند) (Note: Also romanized as Gūnī Kand; also known as Gūney Kandī and Gūnī Kandī) is a village in Angut-e Gharbi Rural District of the Central District (Note: Formerly Ungut District of Germi County) in Ungut County, Ardabil province, Iran.

== Demographics ==
=== Population ===
At the time of the 2006 National Census, the village's population was 225 in 43 households, when it was in Ungut District (Note: Renamed the Central District of Ungut County) of Germi County. (Note: Formerly Moghan County) The following census in 2011 counted 132 people in 33 households. The 2016 census measured the population of the village as 82 people in 27 households.

In 2019, the district was separated from the county in the establishment of Ungut County and renamed the Central District.
