= Kord Kandi, Ungut =

Village in Ardabil province, Iran

Kord Kandi Persian: كردكندي
- Village
- Location within Iran
- Coordinates: 38°54′24″N 47°45′11″E
- Country: Iran
- Province: Ardabil
- County: Ungut
- District: Central
- Rural District: Angut-e Gharbi

Population (2016)
  - Total: 47
- Time zone: UTC+3:30 (IRST)

Kord Kandi (Persian: كردكندي) (Note: Also romanized as Kard Kandi and Kard Kandī) is a village in Angut-e Gharbi Rural District of the Central District (Note: Formerly Ungut District of Germi County) in Ungut County, Ardabil province, Iran.

== Demographics ==
=== Population ===
At the time of the 2006 National Census, the village's population was 62 in 16 households, when it was in Ungut District (Note: Renamed the Central District of Ungut County) of Germi County. (Note: Formerly Moghan County) The following census in 2011 counted 46 people in 13 households. The 2016 census measured the population of the village as 47 people in 16 households.

In 2019, the district was separated from the county in the establishment of Ungut County and renamed the Central District.
