= Charuq Dash =

Village in Ardabil province, Iran

Charuq Dash Persian: چاروق داش
- Village
- Country: Iran
- Province: Ardabil
- County: Ungut
- District: Central
- Rural District: Angut-e Gharbi

Population (2016)
  - Total: 39
- Time zone: UTC+3:30 (IRST)

Charuq Dash (Persian: چاروق داش) (Note: Also romanized as Chārūq Dāsh) is a village in Angut-e Gharbi Rural District of the Central District (Note: Formerly Ungut District of Germi County) in Ungut County, Ardabil province, Iran.

== Demographics ==
=== Population ===
At the time of the 2006 National Census, the village's population was 42 in seven households, when it was in Ungut District (Note: Renamed the Central District of Ungut County) of Germi County. (Note: Formerly Moghan County) The following census in 2011 counted 47 people in nine households. The 2016 census measured the population of the village as 39 people in 11 households.

In 2019, the district was separated from the county in the establishment of Ungut County and renamed the Central District.
