= Kohneh Kand =

Village in Ardabil province, Iran

Kohneh Kand Persian: كهنه كند
- Village
- Location within Iran
- Coordinates: 38°54′27″N 47°45′30″E
- Country: Iran
- Province: Ardabil
- County: Ungut
- District: Central
- Rural District: Angut-e Gharbi

Population (2016)
  - Total: 22
- Time zone: UTC+3:30 (IRST)

Kohneh Kand (Persian: كهنه كند) is a village in Angut-e Gharbi Rural District of the Central District (Note: Formerly Ungut District of Germi County) in Ungut County, Ardabil province, Iran.

== Demographics ==
=== Population ===
At the time of the 2006 National Census, the village's population was 19 in five households, when it was in Ungut District (Note: Renamed the Central District of Ungut County) of Germi County. (Note: Formerly Moghan County) The following census in 2011 counted 19 people in four households. The 2016 census measured the population of the village as 22 people in six households.

In 2019, the district was separated from the county in the establishment of Ungut County and renamed the Central District.
