= Qeshlaq-e Zaviyeh =

Village in Ardabil province, Iran

Qeshlaq-e Zaviyeh Persian: قشلاق زاويه
- Village
- Location within Iran
- Coordinates: 38°53′54″N 47°34′40″E
- Country: Iran
- Province: Ardabil
- County: Ungut
- District: Central
- Rural District: Angut-e Gharbi

Population (2016)
  - Total: 53
- Time zone: UTC+3:30 (IRST)

Qeshlaq-e Zaviyeh (Persian: قشلاق زاويه) (Note: Also romanized as Qeshlāq-e Zāvīyeh; also known as Zāvīyeh Qeshlāq (زاويه قشلاق)) is a village in Angut-e Gharbi Rural District of the Central District (Note: Formerly Ungut District of Germi County) in Ungut County, Ardabil province, Iran.

== Demographics ==
=== Population ===
At the time of the 2006 National Census, the village's population was 69 in 16 households, when it was in Ungut District (Note: Renamed the Central District of Ungut County) of Germi County. (Note: Formerly Moghan County) The following census in 2011 counted 62 people in 16 households. The 2016 census measured the population of the village as 53 people in 10 households.

In 2019, the district was separated from the county in the establishment of Ungut County and renamed the Central District.
