= Shahid Mohammadpur =

Village in Ardabil province, Iran

Shahid Mohammadpur Persian: شهيدمحمدپور
- Village
- Location within Iran
- Coordinates: 38°55′32″N 47°47′47″E
- Country: Iran
- Province: Ardabil
- County: Ungut
- District: Central
- Rural District: Angut-e Gharbi

Population (2016)
  - Total: 134
- Time zone: UTC+3:30 (IRST)

Shahid Mohammadpur (Persian: شهيدمحمدپور) (Note: Also romanized as Shahīd Moḩammadpūr; also known as Sāmānlū (سامانلو)) is a village in Angut-e Gharbi Rural District of the Central District (Note: Formerly Ungut District of Germi County) in Ungut County, Ardabil province, Iran.

== Demographics ==
=== Population ===
At the time of the 2006 National Census, the village's population was 352 in 85 households, when it was in Ungut District (Note: Renamed the Central District of Ungut County) of Germi County. (Note: Formerly Moghan County) The following census in 2011 counted 215 people in 56 households. The 2016 census measured the population of the village as 134 people in 41 households.

In 2019, the district was separated from the county in the establishment of Ungut County and renamed the Central District.
