= Dumuli =

Village in Ardabil province, Iran

Dumuli Persian: دومولي
- Village
- Location within Iran
- Coordinates: 38°53′23″N 47°37′07″E
- Country: Iran
- Province: Ardabil
- County: Ungut
- District: Central
- Rural District: Angut-e Gharbi

Population (2016)
  - Total: 129
- Time zone: UTC+3:30 (IRST)

Dumuli (Persian: دومولي) (Note: Also romanized as Dūmūlī; also known as Domūlī and Dūmūlū) is a village in Angut-e Gharbi Rural District of the Central District (Note: Formerly Ungut District of Germi County) in Ungut County, Ardabil province, Iran.

== Demographics ==
=== Population ===
At the time of the 2006 National Census, the village's population was 187 in 36 households, when it was in Ungut District (Note: Renamed the Central District of Ungut County) of Germi County. (Note: Formerly Moghan County) The following census in 2011 counted 138 people in 37 households. The 2016 census measured the population of the village as 129 people in 33 households.

In 2019, the district was separated from the county in the establishment of Ungut County and renamed the Central District.
