= Gowdah Kahriz =

Village in Ardabil province, Iran

Gowdah Kahriz Persian: گوده كهريز
- Village
- Location within Iran
- Coordinates: 38°59′14″N 47°38′56″E
- Country: Iran
- Province: Ardabil
- County: Ungut
- District: Central
- Rural District: Angut-e Gharbi

Population (2016)
  - Total: 342
- Time zone: UTC+3:30 (IRST)

Gudah Kahriz (Persian: گوده كهريز) (Note: Also romanized as Gowdah Kahrīz and Gūdah Kahrīz) is a village in Angut-e Gharbi Rural District of the Central District (Note: Formerly Ungut District of Germi County) in Ungut County, Ardabil province, Iran.

== Demographics ==
=== Population ===
At the time of the 2006 National Census, the village's population was 382 in 75 households, when it was in Ungut District (Note: Renamed the Central District of Ungut County) of Germi County. (Note: Formerly Moghan County) The following census in 2011 counted 360 people in 94 households. The 2016 census measured the population of the village as 342 people in 100 households.

In 2019, the district was separated from the county in the establishment of Ungut County and renamed the Central District.
