= Vali Beyglu =

Village in Ardabil province, Iran

Vali Beyglu Persian: ولي بيگلو
- Village
- Location within Iran
- Coordinates: 39°01′38″N 47°31′06″E
- Country: Iran
- Province: Ardabil
- County: Ungut
- District: Central
- Rural District: Angut-e Gharbi

Population (2016)
  - Total: 224
- Time zone: UTC+3:30 (IRST)

Vali Beyglu (Persian: ولي بيگلو) (Note: Also romanized as Valī Beyglū; also known as Valī Beyklū) is a village in Angut-e Gharbi Rural District of the Central District (Note: Formerly Ungut District of Germi County) in Ungut County, Ardabil province, Iran.

== Demographics ==
=== Population ===
At the time of the 2006 National Census, the village's population was 218 in 43 households, when it was in Ungut District (Note: Renamed the Central District of Ungut County) of Germi County. (Note: Formerly Moghan County) The following census in 2011 counted 202 people in 51 households. The 2016 census measured the population of the village as 224 people in 62 households.

In 2019, the district was separated from the county in the establishment of Ungut County and renamed the Central District.
