= Farkhlu =

Village in Ardabil province, Iran

Farkhlu Persian: فرخ لو
- Village
- Country: Iran
- Province: Ardabil
- County: Ungut
- District: Central
- Rural District: Angut-e Gharbi

Population (2016)
  - Total: 17
- Time zone: UTC+3:30 (IRST)

Farkhlu (Persian: فرخ لو) (Note: Also romanized as Farkhlū) is a village in Angut-e Gharbi Rural District of the Central District (Note: Formerly Ungut District of Germi County) in Ungut County, Ardabil province, Iran.

== Demographics ==
=== Population ===
At the time of the 2006 National Census, the village's population was 25 in four households, when it was in Ungut District (Note: Renamed the Central District of Ungut County) of Germi County. (Note: Formerly Moghan County) The following census in 2011 counted 40 people in seven households. The 2016 census measured the population of the village as 17 people in four households.

In 2019, the district was separated from the county in the establishment of Ungut County and renamed the Central District.
