= Seyyed Javadlu =

Village in Ardabil province, Iran

Seyyed Javadlu Persian: سيدجوادلو
- Village
- Location within Iran
- Coordinates: 38°56′07″N 47°39′02″E
- Country: Iran
- Province: Ardabil
- County: Ungut
- District: Central
- Rural District: Angut-e Gharbi

Population (2016)
  - Total: 61
- Time zone: UTC+3:30 (IRST)

Seyyed Javadlu (Persian: سيدجوادلو) (Note: Also romanized as Seyyed Javādlū; also known as Seyyed Javādlī) is a village in Angut-e Gharbi Rural District of the Central District (Note: Formerly Ungut District of Germi County) in Ungut County, Ardabil province, Iran.

== Demographics ==
=== Population ===
At the time of the 2006 National Census, the village's population was 100 in 21 households, when it was in Ungut District (Note: Renamed the Central District of Ungut County) of Germi County. (Note: Formerly Moghan County) The following census in 2011 counted 90 people in 22 households. The 2016 census measured the population of the village as 61 people in 18 households.

In 2019, the district was separated from the county in the establishment of Ungut County and renamed the Central District.
