= Emarat, Ardabil =

Village in Ardabil province, Iran

Emarat Persian: عمارت
- Village
- Location within Iran
- Coordinates: 38°57′27″N 47°32′01″E
- Country: Iran
- Province: Ardabil
- County: Ungut
- District: Central
- Rural District: Angut-e Gharbi

Population (2016)
  - Total: 179
- Time zone: UTC+3:30 (IRST)

Emarat (Persian: عمارت) (Note: Also romanized as ‘Emārat; also known as ‘Emāratlū) is a village in Angut-e Gharbi Rural District of the Central District (Note: Formerly Ungut District of Germi County) in Ungut County, Ardabil province, Iran.

== Demographics ==
=== Population ===
At the time of the 2006 National Census, the village's population was 223 in 49 households, when it was in Ungut District (Note: Renamed the Central District of Ungut County) of Germi County. (Note: Formerly Moghan County) The following census in 2011 counted 182 people in 42 households. The 2016 census measured the population of the village as 179 people in 30 households.

In 2019, the district was separated from the county in the establishment of Ungut County and renamed the Central District.
