= Qelich Khanlu =

Village in Ardabil province, Iran

Qelich Khanlu Persian: قليچ خانلو
- Village
- Location within Iran
- Coordinates: 38°55′08″N 47°40′10″E
- Country: Iran
- Province: Ardabil
- County: Ungut
- District: Central
- Rural District: Angut-e Gharbi

Population (2016)
  - Total: 112
- Time zone: UTC+3:30 (IRST)

Qelich Khanlu (Persian: قليچ خانلو) (Note: Also romanized as Qelīch Khānlū) is a village in Angut-e Gharbi Rural District of the Central District (Note: Formerly Ungut District of Germi County) in Ungut County, Ardabil province, Iran.

== Demographics ==
=== Population ===
At the time of the 2006 National Census, the village's population was 137 in 27 households, when it was in Ungut District (Note: Renamed the Central District of Ungut County) of Germi County. (Note: Formerly Moghan County) The following census in 2011 counted 122 people in 30 households. The 2016 census measured the population of the village as 112 people in 32 households.

In 2019, the district was separated from the county in the establishment of Ungut County and renamed the Central District.
