= Nowlu =

Village in Ardabil province, Iran

Nowlu Persian: نولو
- Village
- Location within Iran
- Coordinates: 39°01′15″N 47°31′54″E
- Country: Iran
- Province: Ardabil
- County: Ungut
- District: Central
- Rural District: Angut-e Gharbi

Population (2016)
  - Total: 173
- Time zone: UTC+3:30 (IRST)

Nowlu (Persian: نولو) (Note: Also romanized as Nowlū; also known as Asam ʿAlī Kandī (اسمعلي كندئ)) is a village in Angut-e Gharbi Rural District of the Central District (Note: Formerly Ungut District of Germi County) in Ungut County, Ardabil province, Iran.

== Demographics ==
=== Population ===
At the time of the 2006 National Census, the village's population was 150 in 27 households, when it was in Ungut District (Note: Renamed the Central District of Ungut County) of Germi County. (Note: Formerly Moghan County) The following census in 2011 counted 141 people in 34 households. The 2016 census measured the population of the village as 173 people in 45 households.

In 2019, the district was separated from the county in the establishment of Ungut County and renamed the Central District.
