= Darrehrud-e Shomali Rural District =

Rural district in Ardabil province, Iran

Darrehrud-e Shomali Rural District Persian: دهستان دره‌رود شمالی
- Rural District
- Location within Iran
- Coordinates: 39°09′N 47°37′E
- Country: Iran
- Province: Ardabil
- County: Ungut
- District: Darrehrud
- Established: 2019
- Capital: Aqa Mohammad Beyglu
- Time zone: UTC+3:30 (IRST)

Darrehrud-e Shomali Rural District (Persian: دهستان دره‌رود شمالی) is in Darrehrud District of Ungut County, Ardabil province, Iran. Its capital is the village of Aqa Mohammad Beyglu, whose population at the time of the 2016 National Census was 681 in 197 households.

== History ==
In 2019, Ungut District (Note: Renamed the Central District of Ungut County) was separated from Germi County (Note: Formerly Moghan County) in the establishment of Ungut County and renamed the Central District. Darrehrud-e Shomali Rural District was created in the new Darrehrud District.

=== Other villages in the rural district ===
- Ali Qapu
- Bagheshlu
- Chenar
- Delik Yarqan
- Dikdash
- Gechi Qeshlaq Amirlu
- Hajji Abbas Kandi
- Ilkhchi
- Kadkhodalu
- Lekvan
- Mal Qeshlaqi
- Qarajeh Aghal
- Qeshlaq-e Aba
- Qeshlaq-e Aqa Baba
- Qeshlaq-e Dowlama
- Qeshlaq-e Hajji Abbas
- Qeshlaq-e Hajji Samid
- Qeshlaq-e Olya
- Qurtlu Qeshlaq
- Quytul
- Saluk Qeshlaqi
- Tulan
