= Holan (surname) =

Holan, Holaň, Holán, or Holáň (Czech feminine: -ová) is a surname. It may refer to:

== Holan ==
- Angie Drobnic Holan, American journalist
- Ariel Holan (born 1960), Argentine football manager
- Jaromír Holan (born 1941) Czech ice dancer
- Jerry Holan (1931–2022), American swimmer
- Martina Holan (born 1976), Canadian soccer player
- Miloš Holaň (born 1971), Czech ice hockey player
- Regina Holan, American football player
- Václav Karel Holan Rovenský (1644–1718), Czech composer
- Vilém Holáň (1938–2021), Czech politician
- Vladimír Holan (1905–1980), Czech poet

== Holanova ==
- Dana Holanová, Czech ice dancer
- Kateřina Holánová (born 1977), Czech actress
