= Helan, Vargahan =

Helan هلان
- Village
- Location within Iran
- Coordinates: 38°39′06″N 47°26′55″E
- Country: Iran
- Province: East Azerbaijan
- County: Ahar
- Bakhsh: Central
- Rural District: Vargahan

Population (2006)
  - Total: 99
- Time zone: UTC+3:30 (IRST)
  - Summer (DST): UTC+4:30 (IRDT)

Helan (Persian: هلان, romanized: Helān) is a village in Vargahan Rural District, in the Central District of Ahar County, East Azerbaijan Province, Iran. At the 2006 census, its population was 99, in 22 families.
