= Gechi Qeshlaq-e Olya =

Gechi Qeshlaq-e Olya گچي قشلاق عليا
- Village
- Location within Iran
- Coordinates: 39°12′04″N 47°32′11″E
- Country: Iran
- Province: East Azerbaijan
- County: Khoda Afarin
- Bakhsh: Garamduz
- Rural District: Garamduz

Population (2006)
  - Total: 74
- Time zone: UTC+3:30 (IRST)
  - Summer (DST): UTC+4:30 (IRDT)

Gechi Qeshlaq-e Olya (Persian: گچي قشلاق عليا, also Romanized as Gechī Qeshlāq-e ‘Olyā; also known as Gechī Qeshlāq-e Bālā) is a village in Garamduz Rural District, Garamduz District, Khoda Afarin County, East Azerbaijan Province, Iran. At the 2006 census, its population was 74, in 14 families.
