= Darrehrud-e Jonubi Rural District =

Rural district in Ardabil province, Iran

Darrehrud-e Jonubi Rural District Persian: دهستان دره‌رود جنوبی
- Rural District
- Location within Iran
- Coordinates: 39°06′N 47°39′E
- Country: Iran
- Province: Ardabil
- County: Ungut
- District: Darrehrud
- Established: 2019
- Capital: Qarah Khan Beyglu
- Time zone: UTC+3:30 (IRST)

Darrehrud-e Jonubi Rural District (Persian: دهستان دره‌رود جنوبی) is in Darrehrud District of Ungut County, Ardabil province, Iran. Its capital is the village of Qarah Khan Beyglu, whose population at the time of the 2016 National Census was 922 in 267 households.

== History ==
In 2019, Ungut District (Note: Renamed the Central District of Ungut County) was separated from Germi County (Note: Formerly Moghan County) in the establishment of Ungut County and renamed the Central District. Darrehrud-e Jonubi Rural District was created in the new Darrehrud District.

=== Other villages in the rural district ===
- Chat Qeshlaq-e Bala
- Jaldak
- Jamulu Kandi
- Lakarabad-e Olya
- Lakarabad-e Sofla
- Qeshlaq-e Anjirlu
- Qeshlaq-e Barian
- Qeshlaq-e Chortaqlu
- Qeshlaq-e Qarah Qayeh
- Qeshlaq-e Zargar
- Sarvaghaji
- Seyyedlar
- Tazehabad-e Lakarabad
- Ziveh
