= East Azerbaijan Governance Palace =

Historic building in Tabriz, Iran

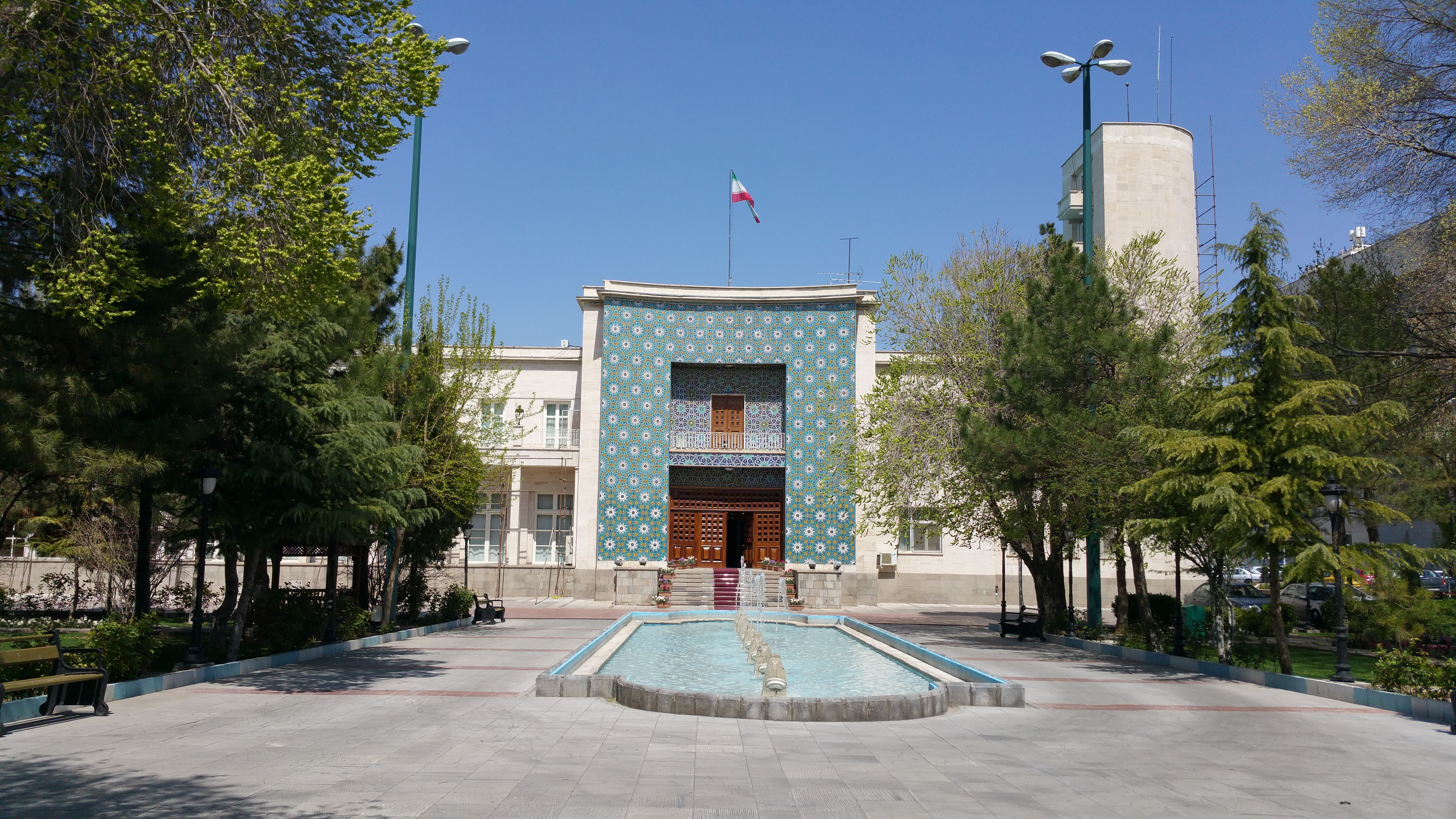
- Interactive map of the East Azerbaijan Governance Palace area

General information
- Location: Tabriz, Iran

The East-Azerbaijan Provincial Palace (Persian: کاخ استانداری آذربایجان شرقی) is the main office for Iran's East-Azerbaijan provincial governor in central Tabriz. The history of the palace goes back to the Safavid and Zand eras, when it was named Aali Qapou.

The original construction of the palace was supervised by Najaf Qoli Khan for the Safavid shahs, when Tabriz was the Iranian capital. During the Qajar era, Aali Qapu served as the residence for the crown prince of Iran. It was reconstructed and repaired under Naser al-Din Shah Qajar, when its name was changed to Shams ol-Emareh. Since the Iranian Constitutional Revolution, the palace has been used as the provincial governorship office.

The main parts of the original building were destroyed in a fire in 1933, which was followed by a major flood. Remaining parts of the original palace were destroyed entirely by Ali Mansur, the East Azerbaijan governor at the time, and a new building constructed. The new building which has survived up to now was mostly constructed in Mansur's time in Tabriz as governor.

Part of the state building is open for public visitors.

== History ==
=== Aali Qapu (1500–1800) ===
The original building of the Ali Qapu palace was built in the late Safavid era, when Tabriz was the capital of Iran.

=== Shams ol Emareh (1800–1933) ===
With the rise of the Qajar dynasty and with the increase of Tabriz's role in Iranian politics and the leading Qajar Royal Family, the city was chosen as the office of the Crown Prince.

=== East Azerbaijan Provincial Palace (1933–present) ===
Following the fall of the Qajar dynasty and during the Pahlavi era, Tabriz lost its traditional dominant role in Iranian politics, along with its traditional royal importance. The building was then used as the office of the East Azerbaijan governor. In 1933 during Adib-ol-Saltaneh Samei (in Persian: ادیب السلطنه سمیعی), large parts of the building were ruined in a fire. Many people were blamed Samei for his ignorance in the protection of the palace. In 1934, some other parts of the building were destroyed during a major flood. In 1946, Governor Ali Mansur (in Persian: علی منصور), the rest of the remaining parts of the palace were destroyed and a new marble building was constructed instead, which has served as the office of the provincial governor till now. In 1969, the Haram-khaneh building was also destroyed and the city's governor office was built in its place. Local people criticized governors for their ignorance and the destruction of the city's heritages.

=== Museum ===
In 2013, a museum titled East Azerbaijan Governorship was established in the building.

=== War Heroes Statues ===
In 2013, statue of six war heroes from Iranian Azerbaijan, who were killed in action during Iran–Iraq War, were erected in Shohada square, in front of the Provincial Palace. The statues include statue of Javad Fakoori, former commander of IRIAF and Mehdi Bakeri, a commander of volunteer forces

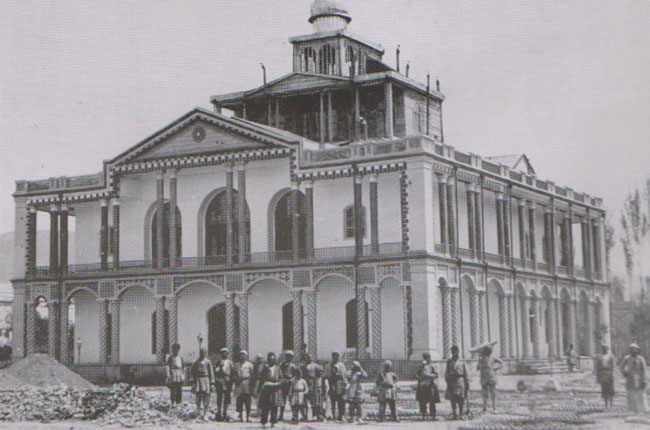
Aali Qapu's main building.

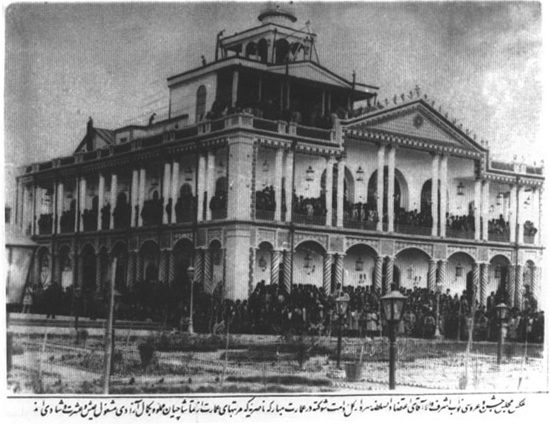
Wedding ceremony of Etezad-ol-Saltaneh.

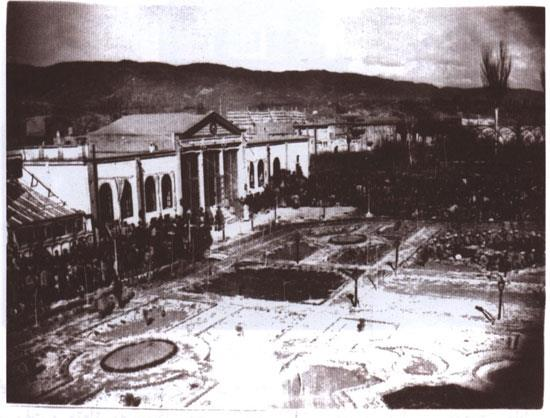
Haramkhane and green house of Aali-Qapu, in a royal ceremony.

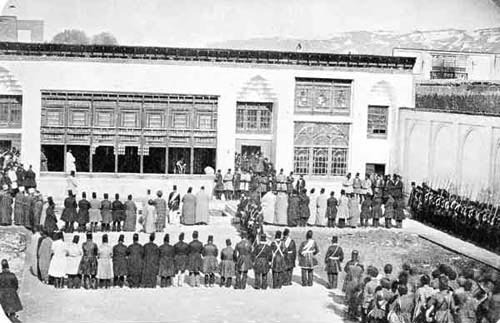
Hail ceremony to Prince Mozaffar Mirza in Haram khana part of Aali Qapu, late 1800s.

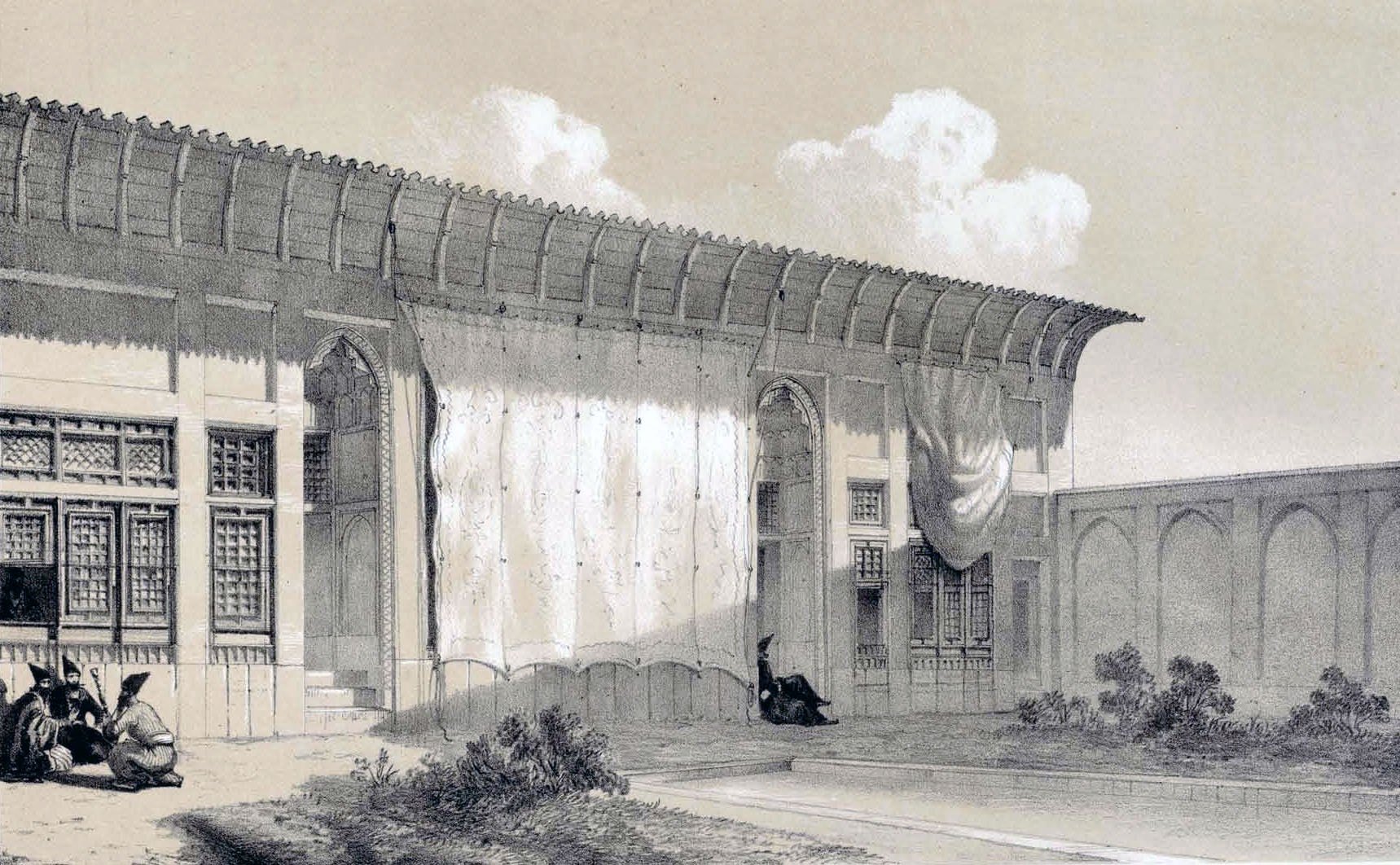
Haramkhane, sketched by Eugene Flandin, 1841.

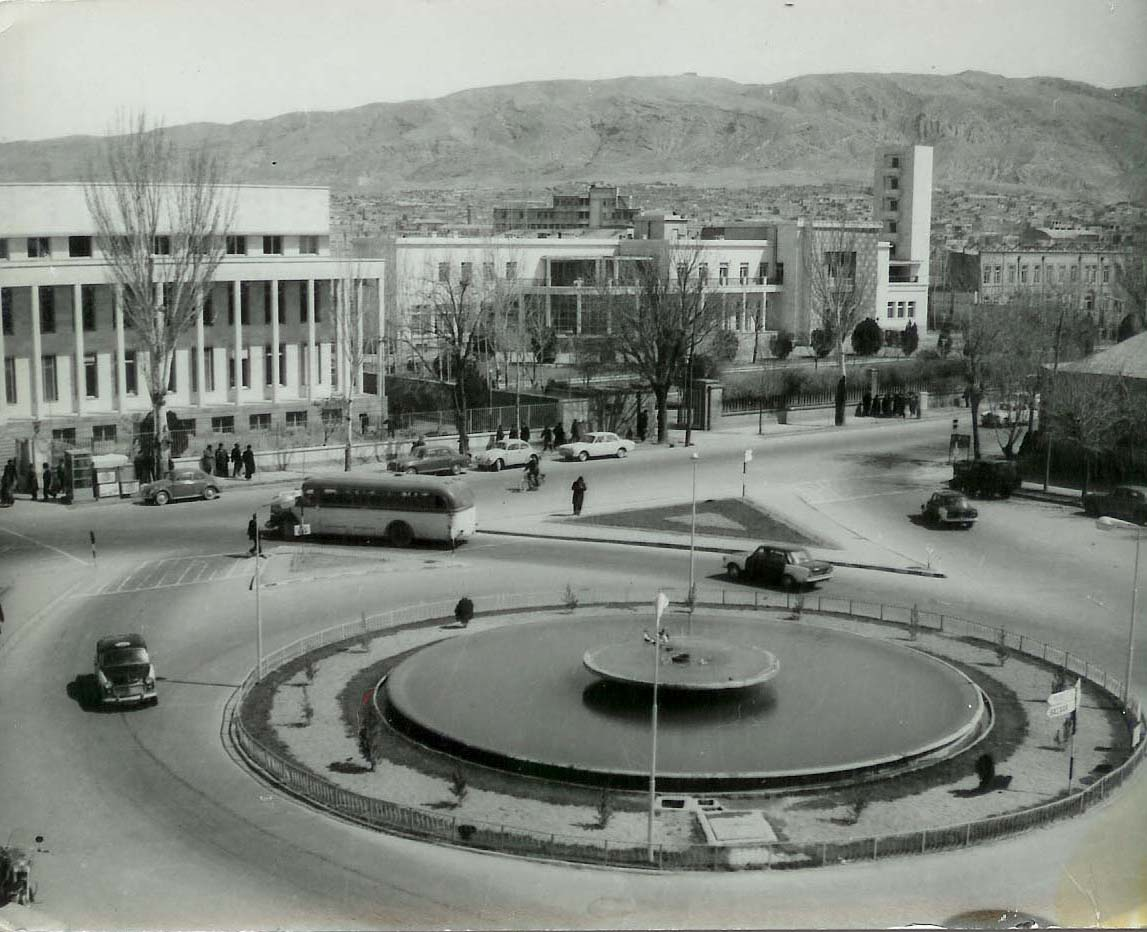
A photo of the State Palace after reconstruction.

== Etymology ==
The original name of the building, i.e., Aali Qapu is made of two parts: 'Aali (عالی) which is from Arabic and means 'high, sublime' and Qapu (قاپو) which is from Turkic and means 'door'.
