= Qarah Saqal, East Azerbaijan =

Qarah Saqal قره سقال
- Village
- Location within Iran
- Coordinates: 37°26′09″N 47°07′31″E
- Country: Iran
- Province: East Azerbaijan
- County: Hashtrud
- Bakhsh: Central
- Rural District: Aliabad

Population (2006)
  - Total: 297
- Time zone: UTC+3:30 (IRST)
  - Summer (DST): UTC+4:30 (IRDT)

Qarah Saqal (Persian: قره سقال, also Romanized as Qarah Saqāl) is a village in Aliabad Rural District, in the Central District of Hashtrud County, East Azerbaijan Province, Iran. At the 2006 census, its population was 297, in 75 families.
