= Isti Baghcheh =

Village in Ardabil province, Iran

Isti Baghcheh Persian: ايستي باغچه
- Village
- Location within Iran
- Country: Iran
- Province: Ardabil
- County: Ungut
- District: Central
- Rural District: Angut-e Gharbi

Population (2016)
  - Total: 183
- Time zone: UTC+3:30 (IRST)

Isti Baghcheh (Persian: ايستي باغچه) (Note: Also romanized as Īstī Bāghcheh; also known as Īstī) is a village in Angut-e Gharbi Rural District of the Central District (Note: Formerly Ungut District of Germi County) in Ungut County, Ardabil province, Iran.

== Demographics ==
=== Population ===
At the time of the 2006 National Census, the village's population was 235 in 54 households, when it was in Ungut District (Note: Renamed the Central District of Ungut County) of Germi County. (Note: Formerly Moghan County) The following census in 2011 counted 214 people in 51 households. The 2016 census measured the population of the village as 183 people in 47 households.

In 2019, the district was separated from the county in the establishment of Ungut County and renamed the Central District.
