= Heybat-e Sofla =

Village in Ardabil province, Iran

Heybat-e Sofla Persian: هيبت سفلي
- Village
- Location within Iran
- Coordinates: 38°55′09″N 47°42′24″E
- Country: Iran
- Province: Ardabil
- County: Ungut
- District: Central
- Rural District: Angut-e Gharbi

Population (2016)
  - Total: Below reporting threshold
- Time zone: UTC+3:30 (IRST)

Heybat-e Sofla (Persian: هيبت سفلي) (Note: Also romanized as Heybat-e Soflá; also known as Heybat-e Pā’īn) is a village in Angut-e Gharbi Rural District of the Central District (Note: Formerly Ungut District of Germi County) in Ungut County, Ardabil province, Iran.

== Demographics ==
=== Population ===
At the time of the 2006 National Census, the village's population was 33 in eight households, when it was in Ungut District (Note: Renamed the Central District of Ungut County) of Germi County. (Note: Formerly Moghan County) The following census in 2011 counted a population below the reporting threshold. The 2016 census again measured the population of the village as below the reporting threshold.

In 2019, the district was separated from the county in the establishment of Ungut County and renamed the Central District.
