= Adam Darrehsi-ye Sofla =

Village in Ardabil province, Iran

Adam Darrehsi-ye Sofla Persian: ادام دره سي سفلي
- Village
- Location within Iran
- Coordinates: 38°57′10″N 47°41′21″E
- Country: Iran
- Province: Ardabil
- County: Ungut
- District: Central
- Rural District: Angut-e Gharbi

Population (2016)
  - Total: 48
- Time zone: UTC+3:30 (IRST)

Adam Darrehsi-ye Sofla (Persian: ادام دره سي سفلي) (Note: Also romanized as Ādam Darrehsī-ye Soflá; also known as Ādam Darrehsī-ye Pā’īn) is a village in Angut-e Gharbi Rural District of the Central District (Note: Formerly Ungut District of Germi County) in Ungut County, Ardabil province, Iran.

== Demographics ==
=== Population ===
At the time of the 2006 National Census, the village's population was 35 in 10 households, when it was in Ungut District (Note: Renamed the Central District of Ungut County) of Germi County. (Note: Formerly Moghan County) The following census in 2011 counted 41 people in 11 households. The 2016 census measured the population of the village as 48 people in 11 households.

In 2019, the district was separated from the county in the establishment of Ungut County and renamed the Central District.
