= Qarah Aghaj-e Bala =

Village in Ardabil province, Iran

Qarah Aghaj-e Bala Persian: قره اغاج بالا
- Village
- Location within Iran
- Coordinates: 38°59′34″N 47°42′00″E
- Country: Iran
- Province: Ardabil
- County: Ungut
- District: Central
- Rural District: Angut-e Gharbi

Population (2016)
  - Total: 260
- Time zone: UTC+3:30 (IRST)

Qarah Aghaj-e Bala (Persian: قره اغاج بالا) (Note: Also romanized as Qarah Āghāj-e Bala; also known as Qarah Āghājlū-ye Bālā and Qareh Āghājlū-ye ‘Olyā) is a village in Angut-e Gharbi Rural District of the Central District (Note: Formerly Ungut District of Germi County) in Ungut County, Ardabil province, Iran.

== Demographics ==
=== Population ===
At the time of the 2006 National Census, the village's population was 328 in 79 households, when it was in Ungut District (Note: Renamed the Central District of Ungut County) of Germi County. (Note: Formerly Moghan County) The following census in 2011 counted 367 people in 80 households. The 2016 census measured the population of the village as 260 people in 75 households.

In 2019, the district was separated from the county in the establishment of Ungut County and renamed the Central District.
