= Quri Daraq, Ardabil =

Village in Ardabil province, Iran

Quri Daraq Persian: قورئ درق
- Village
- Location within Iran
- Coordinates: 38°59′00″N 47°39′49″E
- Country: Iran
- Province: Ardabil
- County: Ungut
- District: Central
- Rural District: Angut-e Gharbi

Population (2016)
  - Total: 42
- Time zone: UTC+3:30 (IRST)

Quri Daraq (Persian: قورئ درق) (Note: Also romanized as Qūrī Daraq) is a village in Angut-e Gharbi Rural District of the Central District (Note: Formerly Ungut District of Germi County) in Ungut County, Ardabil province, Iran.

== Demographics ==
=== Population ===
At the time of the 2006 National Census, the village's population was 65 in 16 households, when it was in Ungut District (Note: Renamed the Central District of Ungut County) of Germi County. (Note: Formerly Moghan County) The following census in 2011 counted 57 people in 12 households. The 2016 census measured the population of the village as 42 people in 10 households.

In 2019, the district was separated from the county in the establishment of Ungut County and renamed the Central District.
