= Helan, Mandi Bahauddin =

Village in Punjab, Pakistan

Coordinates: 32.4896°N 73.6559°E

Helan (or Helaan) is a union council in Phalia Tehsil, Mandi Bahauddin District, Punjab province, Pakistan. The union council contains 10 villages, one of which has given its name to the union council. The 10 villages of the union council are Helan, Charanwala, Burje, Kotli Qazi, Qutli, Dhingranwali, Binder Khurd, Rajoya, Saida Chak, and Heger. Helan is 20 kilometers southeast of Mandi Bahauddin, 8 kilometers north-east of Phalia, 20 kilometers south of Dinga and 4 kilometers north of Mano Chak.
