= Histoi =

Coordinates: 37°37′51″N 26°10′41″E

Histoi or Isti (Ancient Greek: Ἴστοι) was a town of ancient Greece on the north coast of the island of Icaria, with a tolerably good roadstead. Nearby, was a temple of Artemis called Tauropolion.

Its site is an old name of modern Evdilos or is located near it.
