= Heybat-e Olya =

Village in Ardabil province, Iran

Heybat-e Olya Persian: هيبت عليا
- Village
- Location within Iran
- Coordinates: 38°54′03″N 47°42′01″E
- Country: Iran
- Province: Ardabil
- County: Ungut
- District: Central
- Rural District: Angut-e Gharbi

Population (2016)
  - Total: 19
- Time zone: UTC+3:30 (IRST)

Heybat-e Olya (Persian: هيبت عليا) (Note: Also romanized as Heybat-e ‘Olyā; also known as Heybat-e Bālā) is a village in Angut-e Gharbi Rural District of the Central District (Note: Formerly Ungut District of Germi County) in Ungut County, Ardabil province, Iran.

== Demographics ==
=== Population ===
At the time of the 2006 National Census, the village's population was 38 in eight households, when it was in Ungut District (Note: Renamed the Central District of Ungut County) of Germi County. (Note: Formerly Moghan County) The following census in 2011 counted a population of 27 people in eight households. The 2016 census again measured the population of the village as 19 people in seven households.

In 2019, the district was separated from the county in the establishment of Ungut County and renamed the Central District.
