= Qeshlaq-e Helan =

Village in Ardabil province, Iran

Qeshlaq-e Helan Persian: قشلاق هلان
- Village
- Location within Iran
- Coordinates: 38°56′16″N 47°34′42″E
- Country: Iran
- Province: Ardabil
- County: Ungut
- District: Central
- Rural District: Angut-e Gharbi

Population (2016)
  - Total: 17
- Time zone: UTC+3:30 (IRST)

Qeshlaq-e Helan (Persian: قشلاق هلان) (Note: Also romanized as Qeshlāq-e Helān) is a village in Angut-e Gharbi Rural District of the Central District (Note: Formerly Ungut District of Germi County) in Ungut County, Ardabil province, Iran.

== Demographics ==
=== Population ===
The village did not appear in the 2006 National Census, when it was in Ungut District (Note: Renamed the Central District of Ungut County) of Germi County. (Note: Formerly Moghan County) The following census in 2011 counted a population below the reporting threshold. The 2016 census measured the population of the village as 17 people in five households.

In 2019, the district was separated from the county in the establishment of Ungut County and renamed the Central District.
