= Quytul, Azerbaijan =

Quytul
- Municipality
- Location within Azerbaijan
- Coordinates: 40°37′08″N 46°02′07″E
- Country: Azerbaijan
- Rayon: Dashkasan

Population
  - Total: 33
- Time zone: UTC+4 (AZT)
  - Summer (DST): UTC+5 (AZT)

Quytul (also, Getul’, Gotul, and Guytul) is a village and the least populous municipality in the Dashkasan Rayon of Azerbaijan. It has a population of 33.
