= Qeshlaq-e Qareh Seqal =

Village in Ardabil province, Iran

Qeshlaq-e Qareh Seqal Persian: قشلاق قره سقال
- Village
- Country: Iran
- Province: Ardabil
- County: Ungut
- District: Central
- Rural District: Angut-e Gharbi

Population (2016)
  - Total: 0
- Time zone: UTC+3:30 (IRST)

Qeshlaq-e Qareh Seqal (Persian: قشلاق قره سقال) (Note: Also romanized as Qeshlāq-e Qareh Seqāl) is a village in Angut-e Gharbi Rural District of the Central District (Note: Formerly Ungut District of Germi County) in Ungut County, Ardabil province, Iran.

== Demographics ==
=== Population ===
At the time of the 2006 National Census, the village's population was 25 in six households, when it was in Ungut District (Note: Renamed the Central District of Ungut County) of Germi County. (Note: Formerly Moghan County) The following census in 2011 counted 16 people in four households. The 2016 census measured the population of the village as zero.

In 2019, the district was separated from the county in the establishment of Ungut County and renamed the Central District.
