= Qarah Aghaj-e Pain =

Village in Ardabil province, Iran

Qarah Aghaj-e Pain Persian: قره اغاج پائين
- Village
- Location within Iran
- Coordinates: 39°00′19″N 47°41′12″E
- Country: Iran
- Province: Ardabil
- County: Ungut
- District: Central
- Rural District: Angut-e Gharbi

Population (2016)
  - Total: 720
- Time zone: UTC+3:30 (IRST)

Qarah Aghaj-e Pain (Persian: قره اغاج پائين) (Note: Also romanized as Qarah Āghāj-e Pā’īn; also known as Qarah Āghājlū-ye Pā’īn) is a village in, and the capital of, Angut-e Gharbi Rural District in the Central District (Note: Formerly Ungut District of Germi County) of Ungut County, Ardabil province, Iran.

== Demographics ==
=== Population ===
At the time of the 2006 National Census, the village's population was 738 in 168 households, when it was in Ungut District (Note: Renamed the Central District of Ungut County) of Germi County. (Note: Formerly Moghan County) The following census in 2011 counted 761 people in 193 households. The 2016 census measured the population of the village as 720 people in 207 households.

In 2019, the district was separated from the county in the establishment of Ungut County and renamed the Central District.
