= Adam Darrehsi-ye Olya =

Village in Ardabil province, Iran

Adam Darrehsi-ye Olya Persian: ادام دره سي عليا
- Village
- Location within Iran
- Coordinates: 38°56′58″N 47°40′54″E
- Country: Iran
- Province: Ardabil
- County: Ungut
- District: Central
- Rural District: Angut-e Gharbi

Population (2016)
  - Total: 92
- Time zone: UTC+3:30 (IRST)

Adam Darrehsi-ye Olya (Persian: ادام دره سي عليا) (Note: Also romanized as Ādam Darrehsī-ye ‘Olyā; also known as Ādam Darrehsī and Ādam Darrehsī-ye Bālā) is a village in Angut-e Gharbi Rural District of the Central District (Note: Formerly Ungut District of Germi County) in Ungut County, Ardabil province, Iran.

== Demographics ==
=== Population ===
At the time of the 2006 National Census, the village's population was 116 in 24 households, when it was in Ungut District (Note: Renamed the Central District of Ungut County) of Germi County. (Note: Formerly Moghan County) The following census in 2011 counted 108 people in 28 households. The 2016 census measured the population of the village as 92 people in 26 households.

In 2019, the district was separated from the county in the establishment of Ungut County and renamed the Central District.
