= Quri Daraq, West Azerbaijan =

Quri Daraq قوري درق
- Village
- Location within Iran
- Coordinates: 37°02′51″N 46°43′55″E
- Country: Iran
- Province: West Azerbaijan
- County: Miandoab
- Bakhsh: Baruq
- Rural District: Ajorluy-ye Sharqi

Population (2006)
  - Total: 178
- Time zone: UTC+3:30 (IRST)
  - Summer (DST): UTC+4:30 (IRDT)

Quri Daraq (Persian: قوري درق, also Romanized as Qūrī Daraq and Qūrī Doroq) is a village in Ajorluy-ye Sharqi Rural District, Baruq District, Miandoab County, West Azerbaijan Province, Iran. At the 2006 census, its population was 178, in 35 families.
