= Helan, Azghan =

Holan هلان
- Village
- Location within Iran
- Coordinates: 38°28′00″N 46°48′00″E
- Country: Iran
- Province: East Azerbaijan
- County: Ahar
- Bakhsh: Central
- Rural District: Azghan

Population (2006)
  - Total: 51
- Time zone: UTC+3:30 (IRST)
  - Summer (DST): UTC+4:30 (IRDT)

Helan (Persian: هلان, also Romanized as Helān and Holān) is a village in Azghan Rural District, in the Central District of Ahar County, East Azerbaijan Province, Iran. At the 2006 census, its population was 51, in 12 families.
