= Angut-e Gharbi Rural District =

Rural district in Ardabil province, Iran

Angut-e Gharbi Rural District Persian: دهستان انگوت غربي
- Rural District
- Location within Iran
- Coordinates: 38°57′N 47°40′E
- Country: Iran
- Province: Ardabil
- County: Ungut
- District: Central
- Established: 1987
- Capital: Qarah Aghaj-e Pain

Population (2016)
  - Total: 10,721
- Time zone: UTC+3:30 (IRST)

Angut-e Gharbi Rural District (Persian: دهستان انگوت غربي) is in the Central District (Note: Formerly Ungut District of Germi County) of Ungut County, Ardabil province, Iran. Its capital is the village of Qarah Aghaj-e Pain.

== Demographics ==
=== Population ===
At the time of the 2006 National Census, the rural district's population (as a part of Ungut District (Note: Renamed the Central District of Ungut County) in Germi County) (Note: Formerly Moghan County) was 12,806 in 2,585 households. There were 11,855 inhabitants in 2,920 households at the following census of 2011. The 2016 census measured the population of the rural district as 10,721 in 2,953 households. The most populous of its 86 villages was Ziveh (now in Darrehrud-e Jonubi Rural District), with 1,412 people.

In 2019, the district was separated from the county in the establishment of Ungut County and renamed the Central District.

=== Other villages in the rural district ===
- Adam Darrehsi-ye Olya
- Adam Darrehsi-ye Sofla
- Agh Tappeh
- Allah Yarlu
- Anjirlu
- Charuq Dash
- Chenar
- Danial
- Dumuli
- Emarat
- Farkhlu
- Galin Bolaghi
- Gowdah Kahriz
- Guni Kand
- Heybat-e Olya
- Heybat-e Sofla
- Hizan
- Isti Baghcheh
- Kalantar
- Kinu
- Kohneh Kand
- Kord Kandi
- Lachin Darrehsi
- Mardan
- Nowlu
- Qar Qeshlaqi
- Qarah Aghaj-e Bala
- Qelich Khanlu
- Qeshlaq-e Helan
- Qeshlaq-e Qareh Seqal
- Qeshlaq-e Zaviyeh
- Quri Daraq
- Quzlu
- Seyyed Javadlu
- Seyyed Mohammadlu
- Shahid Mohammadpur
- Sheykh Razi
- Shurestan
- Vali Beyglu
- Zaviyeh Sang
