= Darrehrud District =

District in Ardabil province, Iran

Darrehrud District Persian: بخش دره‌رود
- District
- Location within Iran
- Coordinates: 39°07′N 47°39′E
- Country: Iran
- Province: Ardabil
- County: Ungut
- Established: 2019
- Capital: Ziveh
- Time zone: UTC+3:30 (IRST)

Darrehrud District (Persian: بخش دره‌رود) is in Ungut County of Ardabil province, Iran. Its capital is the village of Ziveh, whose population at the time of the 2016 National Census was 1,412 people in 375 households.

== History ==
In 2019, Ungut District (Note: Renamed the Central District of Ungut County) was separated from Germi County (Note: Formerly Moghan County) in the establishment of Ungut County and renamed the Central District. The new county was divided into two districts of two rural districts each, with Angut (Note: Formerly Tazeh Kand-e Angut) as its capital and only city at the time.

== Demographics ==
=== Administrative divisions ===
Darrehrud District
Administrative Divisions
Darrehrud-e Jonubi RD
Darrehrud-e Shomali RD
RD = Rural District
