= Daniel =

Daniel commonly refers to:

- Daniel (given name), a masculine given name and a surname
- List of people named Daniel
- List of people with surname Daniel
- Daniel (biblical figure)
- Book of Daniel, a biblical apocalypse, "an account of the activities and visions of Daniel"

Daniel may also refer to:

== Arts and entertainment ==
=== Literature ===
- Daniel (Old English poem), an adaptation of the Book of Daniel
- Daniel, a 2006 novel by Richard Adams
- Daniel (Mankell novel), 2007

=== Music ===
- "Daniel" (Bat for Lashes song) (2009)
- "Daniel" (Elton John song) (1973)
- "Daniel", a song from Beautiful Creature by Juliana Hatfield
- Daniel (album), 2024, by Real Estate

=== Other arts and entertainment ===
- Daniel (1983 film), by Sidney Lumet
- Daniel (2019 film), a Danish film
- Daniel (comics), a character in the Endless series

== Businesses ==
- Daniel (department store), in the UK
- H & R Daniel, a producer of English porcelain between 1827 and 1846
- Daniel (restaurant), New York City

== Places ==
- Daniel, Greater Poland Voivodeship, Poland, a village
- Daniel, Utah, US, a town
- Daniel, Wyoming, US, a census-designated place
- Daniel (mountain), in the Austrian alps
- Daniel, Curaçao, Kingdom of the Netherlands, a village

== Other uses ==
- Daniel (angel), a fallen angel
- Daniel (son of David), also known as Chileab, a biblical figure
- List of storms named Daniel, several storms
- Daniel (rocket), a French experimental rocket

== See also ==
- Danial (disambiguation)
- Daniele (disambiguation)
- Daniell, surname
- Daniels (disambiguation)
- Danyal, Iran (disambiguation), three villages
