= COVID-19 pandemic in Rhode Island =

Ongoing COVID-19 viral pandemic in Rhode Island, United States

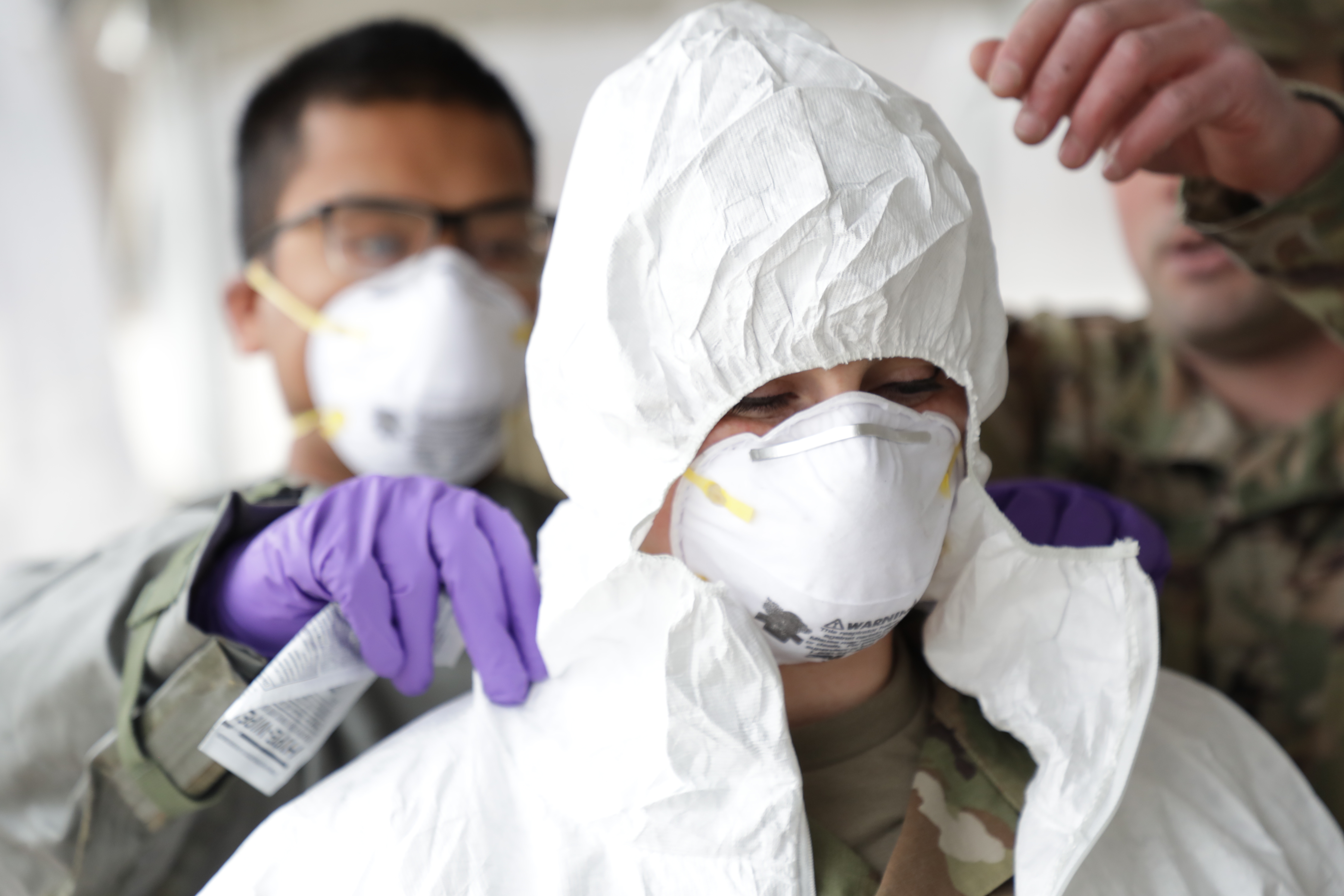
- Preparation for testing at the Community College of Rhode Island in Warwick
- Disease: COVID-19
- Pathogen: SARS-CoV-2
- Location: Rhode Island, U.S.
- First outbreak: Wuhan, Hubei, China
- Index case: Pawtucket, Rhode Island, U.S.
- Arrival date: March 1, 2020
- Confirmed cases: 414,931
- Hospitalized cases: 89
- Critical cases: 5
- Ventilator cases: 0
- Deaths: 3,636
- Fatality rate: 0.88%
- Vaccinations: Percentage of Rhode Islanders that have received at least one dose: over 99%; Percentage of Rhode Islanders that have completed the primary series of vaccinations: 85.28%; Percentage of Rhode Islanders that have received a booster dose: 42.33%

Government website
- https://ri-department-of-health-covid-19-data-rihealth.hub.arcgis.com/

The COVID-19 pandemic in the U.S. state of Rhode Island is part of an ongoing worldwide viral pandemic of coronavirus disease 2019 (COVID-19), a novel infectious disease caused by severe acute respiratory syndrome coronavirus 2 (SARS-CoV-2). As of August 18, 2022, there has been 414,931 confirmed cases of COVID-19 in Rhode Island, 89 of which are currently hospitalized, and 3,636 reported deaths. Rhode Island's COVID-19 case rate and death rate per capita are the highest and twentieth highest, respectively, of the fifty states since the start of the pandemic.

As of August 3, 2022, 1,072,027 Rhode Islanders have received at least one COVID-19 vaccine dose (equivalent to over 99% of the state's population) with 901,041 Rhode Islanders completing the primary vaccine series (equivalent to 85.28% of the state's population), and 447,252 Rhode Islanders receiving at least one booster dose (equivalent to 42.33% of the state's population).

As of August 18, 2022, there have been 151,089 breakthrough COVID-19 cases (49.02% of new cases since the beginning of vaccine rollout and 15.25% of vaccinated Rhode Islanders), 3,339 breakthrough hospitalizations (32.92% of new hospitalizations since the beginning of vaccine rollout and 0.34% of vaccinated Rhode Islanders), and 486 breakthrough deaths (33.40% of new deaths since the beginning of vaccine rollout and 0.05% of vaccinated Rhode Islanders).

COVID-19 pandemic medical cases in Rhode Island by municipality
Municipality (Note: Municipality where individuals with a positive case was diagnosed. Location of original infection may vary.)	Cases (Note: Reported cases includes presumptive and confirmed case. Actual case numbers are probably higher.)	Hosp.	Deaths (Note: Reported deaths includes presumptive and confirmed case. Actual death numbers are probably higher.) (Note: Municipalities designated with <5 resemble less than five deaths up to the most recent update of data.)	Pop.	Cases / 100k	Hosp / 100k (Note: If a municipality has <5 hospitalizations, but greater than zero, then the hospitalization rate is listed as 0.0, though the actual rate is higher.)	CFR (Note: If a municipality has <5 deaths, but greater than zero, then the fatality rate is listed as 0.00, though the actual rate is higher.)
39 / 39	412,179	17,699	3,636	1,056,611	39,009.5	1,675.1	0.88%
Barrington	5,218	115	25	16,178	32,253.7	710.8	0.48%
Bristol	7,075	231	86	22,234	31,820.6	1,038.9	1.22%
Burrillville	5,632	189	85	16,453	34,230.8	1,148.7	1.51%
Central Falls	10,198	327	36	19,382	52,615.8	1,687.1	0.35%
Charlestown	2,349	73	6	7,780	30,192.8	938.3	0.26%
Coventry	12,459	491	140	34,575	36,034.7	1,420.1	1.12%
Cranston	33,003	1,231	222	81,196	40,646.1	1,516.1	0.67%
Cumberland	12,369	430	110	34,652	35,694.9	1,240.9	0.89%
East Greenwich	5,658	187	39	13,073	43,280.0	1,430.4	0.69%
East Providence	17,395	861	251	47,449	36,660.4	1,814.6	1.44%
Exeter	2,086	66	11	6,782	30,757.9	973.2	0.53%
Foster	1,513	58	11	4,689	32,267.0	1,236.9	0.73%
Glocester	2,595	72	10	10,062	25,790.1	715.6	0.39%
Hopkinton	2,437	83	<5	8,111	30,045.6	1,023.3	0.00%
Jamestown	1,281	29	<5	5,496	23,307.9	527.7	0.00%
Johnston	11,887	597	205	29,235	40,660.2	2,042.1	1.72%
Lincoln	8,000	319	95	21,644	36,961.7	1,473.8	1.19%
Little Compton	666	5	<5	3,505	19,001.4	0.0	0.00%
Middletown	5,208	137	27	16,078	32,392.1	852.1	0.52%
Narragansett	4,505	118	14	15,550	28,971.1	758.8	0.31%
New Shoreham	239	<5	0	827	28,899.6	0.0	0.00%
Newport	7,507	206	33	24,762	30,316.6	831.9	0.44%
North Kingstown	9,068	274	99	26,207	34,601.4	1,045.5	1.09%
North Providence	12,963	603	164	32,459	39,936.5	1,857.7	1.27%
North Smithfield	4,173	157	77	12,349	33,792.2	1,271.4	1.85%
Pawtucket	29,883	1,170	184	71,756	41,645.3	1,630.5	0.62%
Portsmouth	4,760	98	19	17,418	27,328.1	562.6	0.40%
Providence	73,620	3,371	683	179,435	41,028.8	1,878.7	0.93%
Richmond	2,145	57	6	7,626	28,127.5	747.4	0.28%
Scituate	3,380	94	13	10,603	31,877.8	886.5	0.38%
Smithfield	8,459	372	176	21,630	39,107.7	1,719.8	2.08%
South Kingstown	8,598	225	53	30,735	27,974.6	732.1	0.62%
Tiverton	4,358	44	17	15,816	27,554.4	278.2	0.39%
Warren	3,746	144	68	10,488	35,717.0	1,373.0	1.82%
Warwick	26,890	1,093	259	81,079	33,165.2	1,348.1	0.96%
West Greenwich	2,037	53	5	6,179	32,966.5	857.7	0.25%
West Warwick	10,135	446	80	28,955	35,002.6	1,540.3	0.79%
Westerly	7,312	294	53	22,624	32,319.7	1,299.5	0.72%
Woonsocket	15,573	746	268	41,539	37,490.1	1,795.9	1.72%
Updated August 22, 2022; Data is publicly reported by Rhode Island Department of Health

== Timeline ==
=== 2020 ===
==== March ====
- March 1: The first two confirmed positive cases of COVID-19 in Rhode Island are identified. Both patients were connected to a St. Raphael Academy February school trip to Italy.
- March 9: Then-Governor Gina Raimondo declares a state of emergency.
- March 11: The University of Rhode Island cancels all in-person classes through April 3, with classes resuming online on March 23.
- March 12: Providence mayor Jorge Elorza postpones all public city meetings and pulls all entertainment licenses in the city, effectively closing all clubs, music venues, and movie theaters.
- March 13:
  - Students at Springbrook Elementary School in Westerly self-quarantine after a student tests positive. The child had received an autograph from Utah Jazz player Rudy Gobert, who had also tested positive, at a Boston Celtics game earlier in the month.
  - Students at Cranston High School West self-quarantine for two weeks after a student tests positive.
  - Twin River Casino in Lincoln and Tiverton Casino in Tiverton close for one week, which is later extended indefinitely.
  - The St. Patrick's Day parade in Newport is canceled for the first time in its 64-year history due to COVID-19 concerns.
  - WSBE-TV, the PBS member station for Rhode Island, cancels the production of all local programming until further notice.
- March 16:
  - Public schools are closed.
  - The Roman Catholic Diocese of Providence cancels all public mass services until further notice.
  - The Preservation Society of Newport County closes all of its mansion properties to public tours.
- March 17:
  - Bars and dine-in restaurants closed, crowds of 25 or more people banned.
  - The Providence Place shopping mall is closed until further notice.
  - The Rhode Island Public Transit Authority closes its facilities at Kennedy Plaza in Providence.
  - All state public libraries are closed through March 22, later extended to April 3.
  - As of this date, there are 23 confirmed cases.
- March 18: The Trinity Repertory Company in Providence cancels the remainder of its 2019–20 theater season.
- March 20:
  - The Rhode Island National Guard is activated to assist the state with the crisis by delivering food and staffing testing centers.
  - Restaurants are allowed by the state to sell beer and wine for take-out orders to supplement their income while dine-in services are suspended.
- March 22:
  - As of this date, there are 83 confirmed cases.
  - Raimondo orders all entertainment and recreation businesses, barber shops, hair salons, and tattoo shops to close.
- March 23:
  - All state public schools resume classes through distance education.
  - The 2020 Rhode Island Democratic primary is postponed from April 28 to June 2.
- March 24:
  - New Shoreham issues a shelter-in-place order for Block Island effective through April 15.
  - The three towns located on Aquidneck Island – Newport, Middletown, and Portsmouth – all implement shelter-in-place orders and require all out-of-state or seasonal residents to quarantine for 14 days upon their arrival.
  - The University of Rhode Island cancels its graduation commencement ceremony scheduled for May 16 and 17.
  - Brown University in Providence postpones its graduation commencement ceremony, which was scheduled for May, until the fall.
  - Travelers entering Rhode Island from T. F. Green Airport are required to self-quarantine for 14 days.
- March 25: The Rhode Island Air National Guard cancels its annual air show, which was scheduled to take place at the Quonset State Airport in North Kingstown in June.
- March 26:
  - Raimondo announces that any individual coming to the state from New York by land or air that plans to stay in Rhode Island must self-quarantine for 14 days. The Rhode Island State Police establish a checkpoint on Interstate 95 at the Rhode Island Welcome Center in Richmond, near the Connecticut border, at which motorists with New York license plates and who plan to stay in the state are required to give their contact information.
  - Raimondo orders grocery stores to limit the number of customers in their building at once to 25% of stated fire capacity.
- March 27:
  - Raimondo extends several gathering bans through April and May, including a ban on dine-in service at restaurants through April 13. Entertainment, recreational and "close-contact" businesses (such as barber shops) are also ordered closed through April 13.
  - As of this date, there are 203 total confirmed cases of COVID-19, 28 of whom are hospitalized.
- March 28:
  - Rhode Island reports its first two deaths from COVID-19: one individual in their 80s who died on March 27, and another individual in their 70s who died on March 28, both of whom had underlying medical conditions.
  - Raimondo enacts a stay-at-home order for all Rhode Islanders who are not travelling to purchase food, household supplies, medicine, or gasoline, or are going for a recreational walk alone.
  - Raimondo announces that any individual travelling to Rhode Island from anywhere outside of the state for non-work purposes are required to quarantine at home for 14 days. Individuals who live in Rhode Island but work outside of the state are also required to quarantine when they are not at work. This legislation replaces the executive order that affected only travelers to New York, which was repealed by then-Governor Raimondo.
  - Gatherings in the state are further restricted, with any gathering of over five people banned.
  - Raimondo orders all "non essential" retail to close until April 13. The Rhode Island Department of Business Regulation issues a list of stores that will be allowed to remain open, including supermarkets, convenience stores, farmers' markets, food banks and pantries, specialty food stores, pharmacies, liquor stores, medical cannabis dispensaries, mail delivery operations, printing shops and operations, pet supply stores, laundromats, gas stations, electronics stores, hardware stores, automobile supply stores, gun shops, funeral homes, banks, healthcare uniform stores, and restaurants offering take-out or delivery. Non-essential retailers, such as book stores and clothing stores, are allowed to continue to receive and send orders made online or by telephone.
  - Police and national guard members knock on doors of homes where cars had New York license plates to remind them of a requirement to self-quarantine.

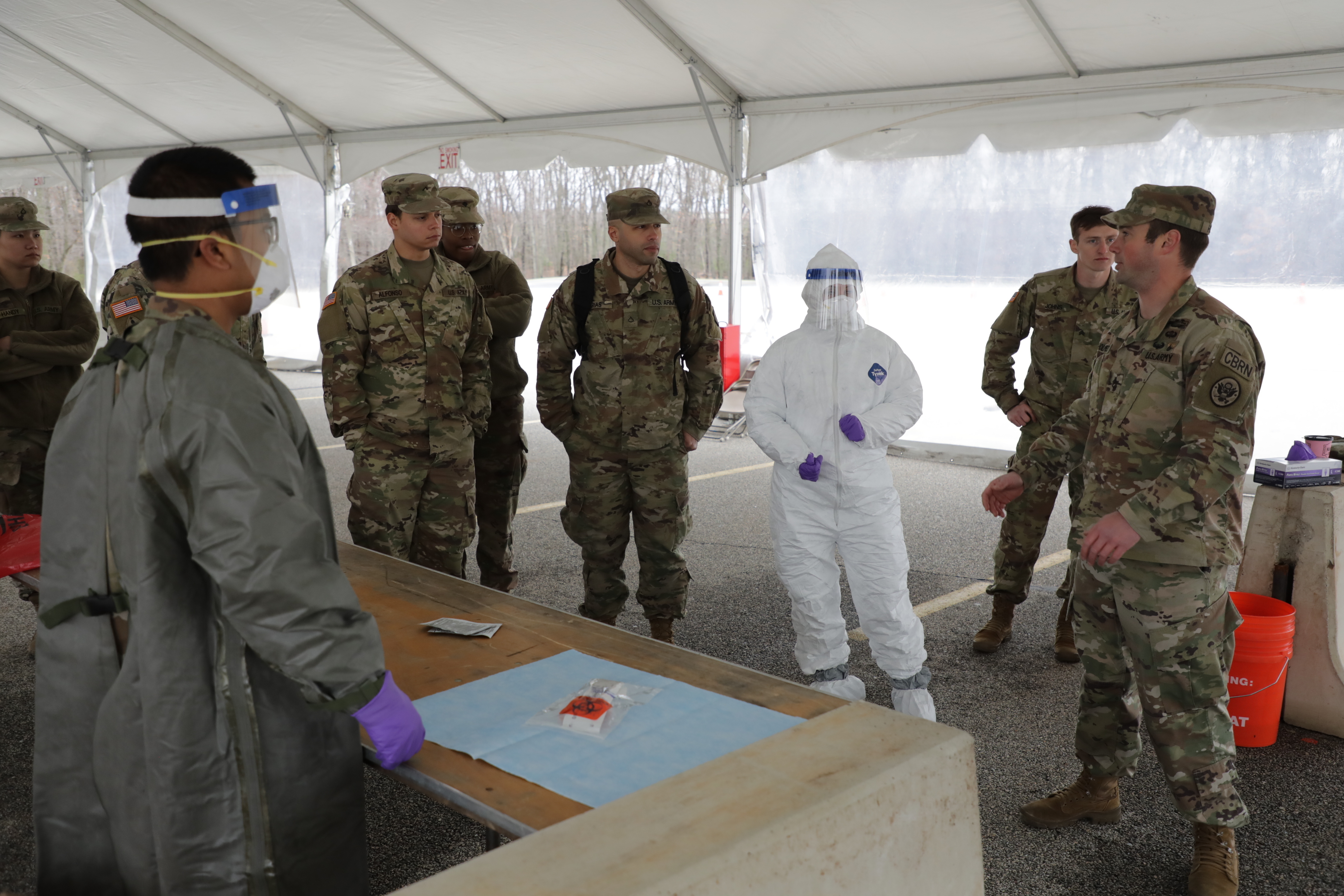
Testing site at the Community College of Rhode Island on March 29, 2020

- March 29:
  - The state suspends all child care licenses through April 3.
  - Following public comments by New York governor Andrew Cuomo, Raimondo and Rhode Island State Police colonel James Manni clarify the wording of the March 28 order, reiterating that all out-of-state passenger vehicles that are planning to stay in Rhode Island are required to visit information centers on the Rhode Island-Connecticut border to collect quarantine information before quarantining in their homes for 14 days. The order does not affect passenger vehicles who are passing through Rhode Island to another state, commuters, or individuals who cross the border to purchase groceries.
- March 30: Raimondo announces that all Rhode Island school buildings will be closed through the end of April, with classes continuing through distance learning.

==== April ====
- April 3:
  - As of this date, state beaches and parks remain closed, with Raimondo citing a lack of social distancing as the reason for the decision.
  - The first COVID-19 case is reported on Block Island.
  - Raimondo announces that three field hospitals will be set up in the state to add 1,000 hospital beds in case of hospital overflow.
- April 5: The annual Gaspee Days Parade and Festival, due to take place in Pawtuxet Village in June, is canceled for 2020.
- April 6:
  - CVS Pharmacy, which is headquartered in Woonsocket, begins a free rapid COVID-19 testing program for Rhode Islanders at Twin River Casino in Lincoln.
  - The 2020 U.S. Senior Open, scheduled to be held at the Newport Country Club in Newport in June, is canceled.
  - Rhode Island surpasses 1,000 confirmed cases of COVID-19, with 1,082 confirmed cases, 109 hospitalized individuals, and 27 deaths in the state as of this date.
- April 7:
  - Providence closes all golf courses and city parks.
  - Raimondo extends the bans on dine-in service at restaurants and social gatherings of more than five people until May 7. The closure of public recreation, entertainment, and close contact business establishments is also extended to that date.
- April 8: Raimondo signs an executive order authorizing the Rhode Island Department of Health to fine individuals who deliberately or repeatedly violate quarantine orders after testing positive for COVID-19, coming into close contact with someone diagnosed with COVID-19, or travelling to Rhode Island for a non-work purpose with intent to stay.
- April 9: Providence College moves its graduation commencement ceremony from May 17 to October 31.
- April 10: Rhode Island surpasses 2,000 confirmed cases of COVID-19. As of this date, there are 2,015 confirmed cases (including 288 new cases), 169 hospitalized individuals, and 49 deaths.
- April 11: The Rhode Island Turnpike and Bridge Authority closes the eastbound toll collection lanes on the Claiborne Pell Newport Bridge overnight; westbound tolling had been suspended on March 26. During nighttime hours, bridge traffic is rerouted through open road tolling lanes.
- April 13: Rhode Island has its first daily decrease in COVID-19 hospitalizations, with 197 hospitalizations compared to 201 on April 12.
- April 14: Rhode Island joins New York, New Jersey, Delaware, Pennsylvania, and Connecticut to form a multi-state council to co-ordinate plans to reopen the economy across the Northeast region once it is safe to do so.
- April 15:
  - Rhode Island Department of Health launches a new statistics website for state COVID-19 data. For the first time, the new website includes cumulative hospital discharges of recovered COVID-19 patients. As of this date, there have been 168 total discharges since the start of the pandemic.
  - Raimondo announces that residents of border communities, such as Tiverton, can shop for groceries out of state without having to quarantine for 14 days when they return to Rhode Island.
  - As of this date, 66 of the 87 reported deaths in Rhode Island are residents of nursing homes, with 23 deaths recorded at one facility in North Providence.
- April 18:
  - As of this date, Rhode Island workers at customer-facing businesses, manufacturing facilities, and offices will be required to wear masks while working. Customers at essential retail will also be strongly encouraged to wear masks. Workers who cannot do their job while wearing masks, such as call center operators and news reporters, are exempt from this rule. Businesses will not be allowed to turn away customers solely because they are not wearing a mask, except for stores in East Providence and Barrington, where town laws have made them mandatory.
  - Special Olympics Rhode Island announces they will hold their summer games virtually in late May; the games had previously been canceled in March.
  - Harvard University reports that Rhode Island is the only state in the country completing enough COVID-19 tests per population – 185 tests per 100,000 residents, above their recommended 152 per 100,000 residents – to reopen its economy.
  - In a conference call with local reporters, then-Governor Raimondo states she does not plan to extend Rhode Island's stay-at-home order after it expires on May 8.
  - Raimondo announces a relief fund for Rhode Island artists, arts and culture workers, and gallery operators.
- April 19: Big box stores are required to close their gardening sections to browsing; sales of gardening items and seeds will continue to be allowed via pick-up, delivery, and appointment.
- April 20:
  - Rhode Island surpasses 5,000 COVID-19 cases; as of this date, there are 5,090 confirmed cases and 155 deaths in the state.
  - Raimondo announces six key indicators that will determine when Rhode Island will reopen its economy: whether the spread has continued to decrease in the state, whether the state has supports in place for vulnerable populations and those in quarantine, whether the state healthcare system has the capacity and the personal protective equipment to handle another surge, whether large gathering spaces (such as schools and houses of worship) have plans for long-term social distancing, and whether the state is prepare to reimpose measure or close the economy again it is necessary.
- April 21: The state's first walk-up testing facility opens in Providence.
- April 22:
  - Memorial Hospital in Pawtucket, which was closed in 2018, is reopened as a testing site for the Blackstone Valley area.
  - Then-Governor Raimondo announces that she is working with the Rhode Island Department of Environmental Management on a staggered plan to re-open state parks and beaches as part of the first phase of the state's reopening; the plan would not go into effect until after the state stay-at-home order ends on May 8.
  - 100 workers at the Taylor Farms New England food processing facility in North Kingstown test positive for COVID-19.
- April 23: Then-Governor Raimondo announces that Rhode Island schools will utilize distance learning for the remainder of the school year.
- Raimondo announces proms and graduation ceremonies scheduled for the spring would be canceled, with the state and Rhode Island PBS would air a special commencement broadcast for graduating high school seniors in June.
- April 24:
  - The Rhode Island Interscholastic League cancels all school sports activities for the spring.
  - 80 workers at Daniele, Inc., a cured meat production facility in Burrillville, test positive for COVID-19.
- April 25: Around 100 protesters participate in a "Reopen Rhode Island" protest at the Rhode Island State House in response to Raimondo's stay-at-home order. The protest is countered by one in support of Raimondo and the restrictions, in which emergency room and health care workers stood on the steps of the State House.
- April 26:
  - New positive cases of COVID-19 in Rhode Island decrease to their lowest daily numbers since April 18, with 310 new cases on this date.
  - Then-Governor Raimondo affirms that the state stay-at-home order would not likely be extended and could be lifted when it expires on May 8, which would begin the gradual reopening plan for Rhode Island's economy.
- April 27:
  - Twelve residents at the Rhode Island Veterans Home in Bristol test positive for COVID-19.
  - Garden centers and gardening supply stores are allowed to reopen.
  - Then-Governor Raimondo announces a phased plan to re-open Rhode Island's economy once the stay-at-home order is lifted. In the first re-opening phase, gathering sizes would be increased from five people to ten, elective surgeries at hospitals could resume, and non-essential stores would be allowed to offer in-store pickup of pre-ordered items. Parks, dentistry offices, hair salons, and barber shops would also be allowed to re-open with social distancing guidelines. Additional restrictions on retail, restaurants, and large gatherings would be lifted in subsequent phases. In order for the stay-at-home order to be lifted, or for the plan to move from one phase to the next, there would have to be a two-week downward trend in new COVID-19 cases or a trend in declining hospitalizations. A dramatic increase in COVID-19 cases or deaths at any time would result in the state restricting gatherings again.
- April 28: The Rhode Island Department of Health confirms that state hospital COVID-19 patient discharge numbers also includes patients who died in the hospital. Of the 466 discharges recorded as of this date, 86 are hospital deaths.
- April 29:
  - The discharge numbers announced the day prior are revised to exclude the 86 hospital deaths which are already counted in death statistics, and instead only list the 391 hospital patients who recovered.
  - Then-Governor Raimondo announces that large events, concerts, and parades scheduled for the summer would not be allowed to occur. Gatherings of over 100 people, such as large weddings, may be allowed by August if case numbers decline.
  - The Rhode Island Philharmonic Orchestra cancels the remainder of its 2019–20 season, with the exception of its 75th anniversary gala, which was rescheduled to October 11.
  - The Newport Folk and Newport Jazz festivals cancel their 2020 editions, which were due to take place in July and August.
  - The Washington County Fair, which was to be held in August, is canceled for 2020.
- April 30:
  - As of this date, there are 266 deaths in Rhode Island attributed to COVID-19. Between 175 and 179 of these deaths are connected to nursing homes.
  - Bryant University announces plans to hold its fall semester at its Smithfield campus.
  - The Rhode Island Department of Health revises its hospitalization numbers to include patients due to a new computerized system that also includes patients who were diagnosed with COVID-19 but were initially admitted to the hospital for reasons other than the illness; those cases were included in state positive case numbers but not hospital data before April 30.

==== May ====
- May 2:
  - Providence reopens nine of its city parks, including Roger Williams Park, for running, walking, and bicycling. 23 city streets are closed to through traffic, except for emergency vehicles and residents of those streets, to allow for socially distanced exercise.
  - As of this date, there are no active cases of COVID-19 on Block Island; The only case confirmed on the island was a seasonal resident who was evacuated from the island and did not return upon recovery.
- May 4:
  - The Rhode Island Department of Environmental Management lifts emergency restrictions on trout fishing that had been put in place when the season opened on April 6.
  - Providence reopens three streets that had been closed to through traffic on May 2.
  - The Wickford Art Festival cancels its 2020 edition, which was scheduled to be held in Wickford in July.
- May 5: Raimondo issues an executive order, to be effective May 8, requiring all Rhode Island residents to wear a face covering in public places.

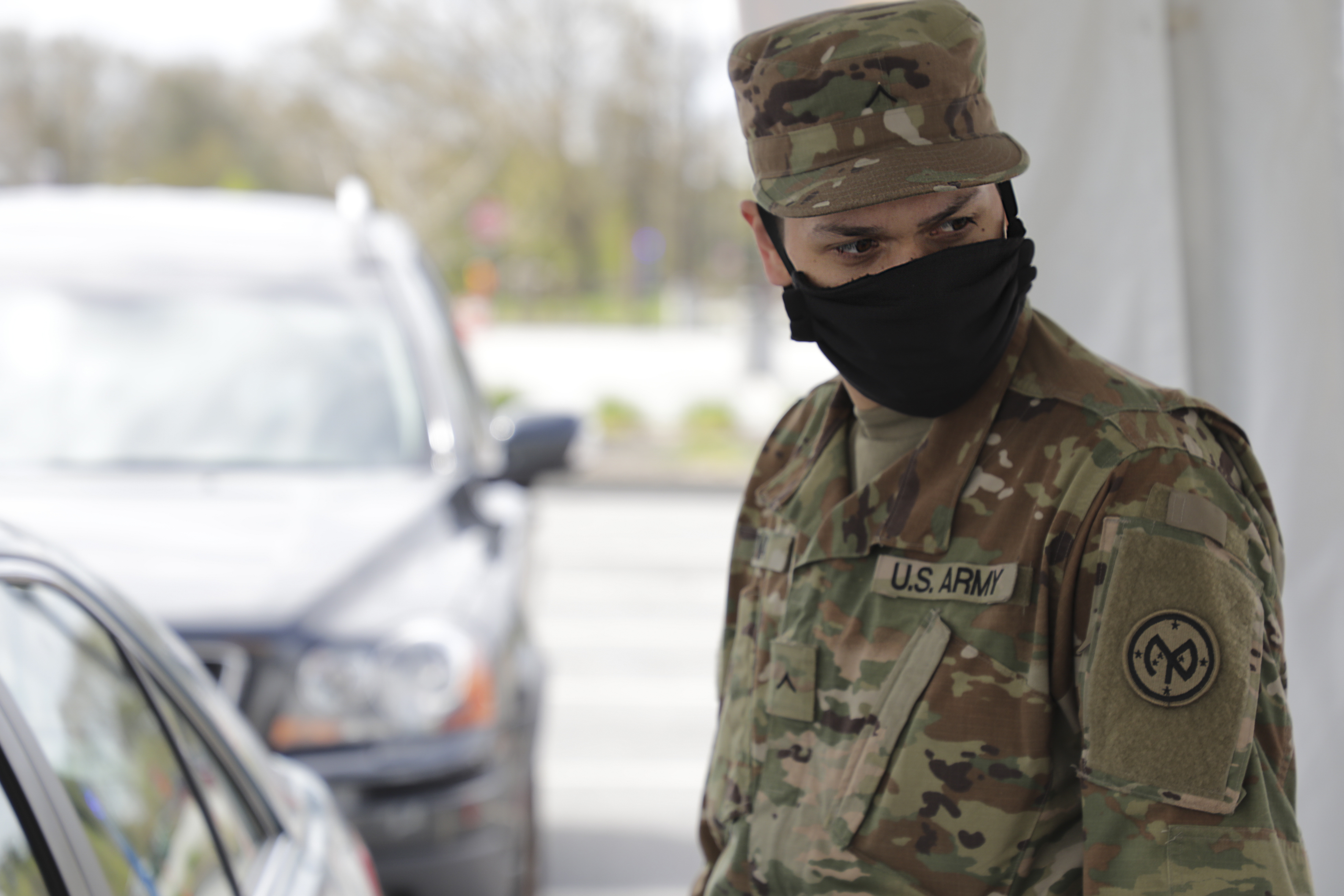
Drive through testing site at Rhode Island College in North Providence

- May 6: Rhode Island surpasses 10,000 confirmed cases of COVID-19; As of this date, there are 10,205 cases and 370 deaths in the state attributed to COVID-19.
- May 8:
  - Raimondo lifts the current state stay-at-home order, to be effective the next day, but urges individuals to not visit mothers in nursing homes, assisted living facilities, or hospitals for Mother's Day.
  - Rhode Island Department of Health director Nicole Alexander-Scott reports that of the 7,129 COVID-19 cases reported as of April 25, 6,800 had recovered, bringing the state recovery rate to 95.39%.
- May 9:
  - The state stay-at-home order is lifted after expiring the previous day. On May 7, then-Governor Raimondo stated she decided not to renew the order because of increased state-wide testing, declining hospitalizations, and a sufficient supply of personal protective equipment.
  - The first phase of the state re-opening plan is enacted after the stay-at-home order expires. Following the expiration of the stay at home order, non-essential retailers will be allowed to open with restrictions and hospitals will be allowed to resume required non-emergency medical procedures.
  - Fifteen state parks are reopened but face COVID-19-related restrictions, such as maintaining social distancing, reducing hours of operation, and limiting parking spaces.
- May 11:
  - Then-Governor Raimondo's daily media briefings are moved from the Rhode Island State House to the Veterans Memorial Auditorium to allow news reporters to attend in person for the first time since March.
  - A second protest against the state's current COVID-19 restrictions, hosted by local radio personality John DePetro and attended by about 40 protesters, is held outside the Rhode Island State House.
- May 13:
  - The Rhode Island Supreme Court resumes hearing cases remotely.
  - Yawgoog Scout Reservation in Rockville cancels all summer Boy Scout camps.
- May 14: Raimondo announces libraries will be allowed to reopen their buildings for limited browsing in the second phase of the state plan.
- May 15:
  - The International Tennis Hall of Fame in Newport cancels its 2020 induction ceremony, which was due to take place in July; 2020 inductees will instead be recognized during the 2021 ceremony.
  - The Rustic Drive-In in North Smithfield and Misquamicut Drive-in in Westerly are the first movie theaters in the state to re-open for regular film screenings, with social distancing in place.
  - Then-Governor Raimondo announces that the second phase of the state reopening plan would be enacted in June; it had been previously indicated that the phases would be in two-week increments. Raimondo also unveils the four metrics that will be taken into consideration by the state to move between phases: hospital capacity, new hospitalizations, the rate of spread, and the double rate of hospitalizations.
- May 16: Rhode Island National Guard ends its checkpoint operations at T.F. Green International Airport and the Rhode Island border, which had begun in March and notified out-of-state visitors to Rhode Island of the 14-day quarantine rule.
- May 17: The University of Rhode Island holds a virtual recognition ceremony for the undergraduate class of 2020, featuring an address from then-Governor Raimondo. An event for graduate students was held the day prior.
- May 18:
  - Restaurants are allowed to resume outdoor dining as of this date.
  - Rhode Island surpasses 500 recorded deaths related to COVID-19. As of this date, there have been 506 deaths and 12,795 positive cases recorded in the state.
  - Then-Governor Raimondo announces tentative plans to restart Sunday services at houses of worship beginning the weekend of May 30.
- May 19:
  - 26 new COVID-19-related deaths are recorded in Rhode Island, the highest one day toll to date.
  - The state releases a contact tracing app called "Crush COVID RI", in which users can keep track of 20 days worth of their travel history on their mobile phone in case they are diagnosed with COVID-19.
- May 23: Third Beach, located in Middletown, opens for the season, but only for Middletown residents.
- May 25: East Matunuck State Beach in South Kingstown and Scarborough State Beach in Narragansett reopen with limited parking.
- May 29: CVS opens ten drive-through COVID-19 testing sites around the state.
- May 30: Houses of worship resume service with a 25 percent capacity limit being enforced. The Roman Catholic Diocese of Providence resumes public mass.
- May 31: At the end of May, there are 718 deaths in Rhode Island attributed to COVID-19.

==== June ====
- June 1:
  - Rhode Island moves into the second phase of its reopening plan. In this phase, the social gathering limit is increased to 15 people, barbershops, salons, gyms, and fitness studios re-open with a reduced capacity, and offices are allowed to bring one-third of their employees back to work in-person.
  - Childcare facilities re-open.
  - Amtrak resumes service of its Acela Express high-speed train, which stops in Providence, on a modified schedule and with reduced capacity.
  - Indoor dining at restaurants resumes at 50 percent capacity, with no standing service allowed. Live music performances are allowed, provided there is at least 14 feet of distance between the performer and guests.
  - All state beaches reopen, but with some restrictions like reduced parking.
  - Providence Place and Warwick malls reopen to customers.
- June 2:
  - Roger Williams Park Zoo in Providence reopens.
  - Most travel restrictions to Rhode Island are lifted, and out-of-state travelers who intend to stay in the state will no longer be required to quarantine for 14 days unless they are traveling from a region or state that is still under a stay-at-home order.
  - Youth and adult sports are allowed to resume with 15 or fewer regular participants, although tournaments and league play are still not allowed.
- June 5: Some city-owned buildings in Providence reopen, with most of the Providence Place mall remaining closed.
- June 8: Twin River Casino in Lincoln and Tiverton Casino in Tiverton are reopened by invitation only.
- June 15:
  - Rhode Island records less than a 2% positivity rate from tests over the weekend, the lowest rate since the beginning of the pandemic. In addition, hospitalizations, ventilator cases, and intensive care cases see declining numbers.
  - A television special for graduating Rhode Island high school seniors airs on Rhode Island PBS featuring a keynote speech by actress and Central Falls native Viola Davis, appearances by Seth MacFarlane, Julian Edelman, Meredith Vieira, and Elizabeth Beisel, and performances by singers Billy Gilman and Erika Van Pelt.
- June 19: The Rhode Island Department of Health reports that no cases of COVID-19 confirmed in Rhode Island over the previous two weeks were connected to participation in the George Floyd protest in Providence on June 5.
- June 21: The International Tennis Hall of Fame in Newport reopens to the public.
- June 25: Rhode Island reports 25 positive tests, the lowest number of positive cases since March 25, with hospitalizations falling under 100 patients for the first time since late March.
- June 28: CNN reports that in the past week, Rhode Island and Connecticut have been the only two states in which COVID-19 cases have decreased. The remaining 48 states either have increased case rates or were tracking steady.
- June 29:
  - Summer camps for children open for the season, with new protocols for group gatherings and cleaning.
  - New quarantine orders are ordered by Governor Raimondo: any visitor who arrives in Rhode Island from a state that is still undergoing a COVID-19 surge will be required to quarantine for 14 days, excepting those who can prove they had recently tested negative. Rhode Islanders who return to the state from a state where at least 5% of the tests are positive are required to take a COVID-19 test within 72 hours of their return to Rhode Island; otherwise, they will have to quarantine for 14 days.
- June 30:
  - Rhode Island enters phase three of the state's reopening plan. In the third phase, social gatherings of up to 25 people and public events of up to 125 people are allowed and museums, arcades, bowling alleys, and movie theaters will be allowed to reopen with social distancing measures in place.
  - At the end of June, there are a total 950 deaths in Rhode Island attributed to COVID-19.

==== July ====
- July 4: The Bristol Fourth of July Parade, the oldest Independence Day celebration in the United States, is held as a "drive-by" parade, with participants driving the route in their cars instead of marching the streets of Bristol.
- July 8: Visitations at Rhode Island nursing homes are permitted to resume.
- July 13: Rhode Island's seven-day average of new cases reaches 55, its highest point in three weeks.
- July 23: The number of deaths resulting from COVID-19 in Rhode Island exceeds 1,000. Then-Governor Raimondo orders all state flags lowered to half-mast until July 26 in memory of Rhode Islanders who have died from COVID-19.
- July 29: Following a rise in COVID-19 cases connected to outdoor gatherings, then-Governor Raimondo announces Rhode Island would not move to the fourth phase of its reopening plan, instead reducing social gathering limits from 25 to 15 people.

==== August ====
- August 11: The number of COVID-19 cases in Rhode Island surpasses 20,000.

==== September ====
- September 3: Rhode Island's positivity rate for COVID-19 drops below 1 percent, with then-Governor Raimondo stating it was a "banner day" for the state, as 8,500 tests were conducted in a single day.
- September 14: Rhode Island public schools open for the academic year. While most students attend in-person learning, around 25% of students choose to start the year with distance learning.
- September 18: Providence College reports 120 positive COVID-19 cases over the last three days and switches to remote learning for at least the next week while the college goes into lockdown. As of this date, over 200 COVID-19 cases in the state are affiliated with Rhode Island colleges.
- September 25: Rhode Island removes 249 COVID-19 cases from its cumulative case count due to duplicate positive cases.
- September 30: Rhode Island reports 192 positive cases of COVID-19, with 173 of the tests coming from September 29. This is the highest single-day case count since May 29. At her weekly news conference, then-Governor Raimondo claims that the "spike" in cases is coming from those aged 19–24, but decides to allow trick-or-treating on Halloween.

==== October ====
- October 15: Rhode Island reports 274 COVID-19 cases, both from the prior day and cases added on to earlier dates. Consequently, Raimondo enforces new measures to help limit the spread of COVID-19: businesses' break rooms will be closed for 90 days, police presence will be tripled on Halloween, people will be fined $500 if they attend gatherings of more than 15 people.
- October 23: Rhode Island hits a new one-day record for the most recorded COVID-19 cases since the start of the pandemic: 524 cases. The number of total positive cases surpasses 30,000.

==== November ====
- November 5: Rhode Island hits another new one-day record for the most recorded COVID-19 cases: 566 cases. Raimondo issues some new restrictions: a voluntary stay-at-home advisory during night hours, the closing of facilities 10 PM on weeknights and 10:30 PM on weekends, and public gathering restrictions: 50% capacity for indoor gatherings and 66% for outdoor gatherings.
- November 13: As record-breaking cases continue to increase, Rhode Island records 1,091 total new positive cases, a record for a single day. It is also the first time that the state has recorded over 1,000 cases in a single day; the day before, there were a record 988 new cases.
- November 19: Then-Governor Raimondo announces a two-week "pause" due to increasing cases, from November 30 (two days after Thanksgiving) to December 13. Gyms, bars, and casinos are ordered to close, restaurant capacity is reduced to 33%, houses of worship are reduced to 25% capacity, companies are ordered to maximize work from home, and social gatherings with multiple households are prohibited. High schools are reduced to 25% capacity, with special-needs, English language learners, and at-risk students prioritized for in-person learning.
- November 30: Then-Governor Raimondo issues statewide Wireless Emergency Alerts, warning that hospitals had reached capacity and urging residents to stay at home, work remotely, avoid social gatherings, and get tested for COVID-19. The first patients are admitted to dedicated COVID-19 non-ICU facilities at a field hospital in Cranston and another at the Rhode Island Convention Center.

==== December ====
- December 3: As hospitalizations continue to grow, Rhode Island records 1,717 additional cases in a single day, another new record. The number of total positive cases surpasses 60,000.
- December 6: MSNBC reports that Rhode Island leads the nation in cases per capita over the last seven days.
- December 14: The first doses of the Pfizer-BioNTech COVID-19 vaccine are distributed among Rhode Island hospitals to high-risk health care workers.
- December 17: As more health care workers receive their initial doses of the Pfizer-BioNTech COVID-19 vaccine, then-Governor Raimondo announces at her weekly news briefing that the number of doses of the COVID-19 vaccine will be "unexpectedly reduced" through next week with no clear explanation being provided by Operation Warp Speed.
- December 21: Rhode Island surpasses 80,000 total COVID-19 cases. Through updates of earlier data released on this day, Rhode Island records a single-day fatality high (consisting of 25 deaths) occurring eight days prior; furthermore, hospitalizations decrease from 459 to 429 over the weekend.
- December 22: The first doses of the Moderna COVID-19 vaccine in the state are received by Lifespan. These first doses were distributed among Rhode Island Hospital, Newport Hospital, and Miriam Hospital.

=== 2021 ===
==== January ====
- January 4:
  - As hospitalizations continue to slightly decline and Rhode Island surpasses 90,000 COVID-19 cases, the first people start to receive their second doses of the Pfizer COVID-19 vaccine.
  - Allan Fung, former mayor of Cranston, tests positive for COVID-19. He was expected to swear in Kenneth Hopkins, his successor as mayor, that same day.
- January 11: Rhode Island surpasses a "significant milestone": 100,000 total COVID-19 cases.

==== February ====
- February 22: The Rhode Island Department of Health adds additional 81 deaths to the state's COVID-19 death count due to recent confirmation of these deaths being affiliated with COVID-19.

==== March ====
- March 1: Rhode Island marks one year since its first COVID-19 case.
- March 2: Daniel McKee ascends to the governorship upon the resignation of Gina Raimondo upon her joining the cabinet of the Biden administration.
- March 8: The Newport St. Patrick's Day parade is canceled for the second consecutive year. The parade committee plans to hold a postponed parade in September, pending city council approval. In May, Newport mayor Jeanne-Marie Napolitano said the parade would likely not be held in the fall, not because of COVID-19 related restrictions, but due to lack of preparation time and because other events, such as weddings, may conflict with a September parade date.
- March 18: Rhode Island Governor Dan McKee and the Newport Folk and Jazz festivals announce that the festivals will be held in the summer as planned, in a scaled-down form with modified capacity.

==== April ====
- April 12: Rhode Island opens COVID-19 vaccines to anybody at least 40 years old and to individuals at least 16 years old in certain zip codes, with the majority from Providence County.
- April 13: Rhode Island temporarily halts the distribution of the Janssen COVID-19 vaccine "out of an abundance of caution", as six recipients develop a severe blood clot after getting the vaccine.
- April 19: Rhode Island opens COVID-19 vaccines to anybody at least 16 years old. At this time, individuals 16 or 17 years old can only get the Pfizer-BioNTech COVID-19 vaccine.
- April 26: Rhode Island resumes use of the Johnson & Johnson vaccine.
- April 29: Governor McKee announces that Rhode Island beaches will open to "full capacity" in the summer, with masks being mandatory in crowded areas.

==== May ====
- May 7:
  - The seven-day rolling average of new COVID-19 cases in Rhode Island drops below 200 cases for the first time since mid-October 2020.
  - Rhode Island eases numerous COVID-19 restrictions; for example, businesses and venues can operate at 80% capacity, larger social gatherings are allowed (25 people indoors, 75 outdoors), and bars can stay open past midnight.
- May 9: Rhode Island surpasses 1 million COVID-19 vaccinations.
- May 10: The number of people hospitalized for COVID-19 at any given time drops to under 100 for the first time since early October 2020.
- May 11: Rhode Island authorizes the Pfizer-BioNTech COVID-19 vaccine for individuals 12 to 15 years old.
- May 17: As of this date, at least 500,000 Rhode Islanders have been fully vaccinated.
- May 18: Fully vaccinated Rhode Islanders are no longer required to wear masks or socially distance in most circumstances, with the exception of hospitals, schools, and public transportation.
- May 21: Most of the state's COVID-19-related restrictions to businesses are lifted by Governor McKee. Stores, restaurants, gyms, and churches can operate at 100% capacity, limits are removed from funeral and catered event capacity, and bars resume standing-only service. Nightclubs will remain at 50% capacity until all patrons can prove they are vaccinated.

==== June ====
- June 11: Governor McKee extends Rhode Island's state of emergency until July 9, stating that the order is still in place because it "responds not only to the pandemic itself, but its after effects".
- June 14: As of this date, there were no deaths attributed to COVID-19 in Rhode Island for eight consecutive days.
- June 18: McKee removes capacity restrictions on live performances, nightclubs, saunas and hookah bars.
- June 21: For the first time since March 14, 2020, there are no new hospital admissions for COVID-19.
- June 26–27: Due to fewer tests being conducted, Rhode Island closes 13 of its 38 COVID-19 testing sites over a two-day span.
- June 30: Six Rhode Island National Guard members are given the Theodore Conrad Hascall Award for their roles in responding to the COVID-19 pandemic: administering vaccinations, running testing sites, and setting up field hospitals.

==== July ====
- July 1: Rhode Island becomes the fifth state to vaccinate at least 70% of its eligible adult population against COVID-19.
- July 5: The Bristol Fourth of July Parade is held with a full crowd and no COVID-19 related restrictions.
- July 6: As of this date, 60% of Rhode Island's population has been fully vaccinated against COVID-19.
- July 9: Governor McKee terminates the state mask mandate and telemedicine insurance coverage requirement but extends the COVID-19 emergency declaration through August 6.
- July 10: Rhode Island records its first COVID-19 related death since June 29; the twelve day stretch is the longest period between deaths in the state since the pandemic began.
- July 10–11: The Wickford Art Festival returns after being canceled in 2020 due to COVID-19. While no COVID-19 related restrictions are enforced, the number of artists that contributed to the festival decreases by about 20 percent.
- July 21: Rhode Island reports 91 new cases of COVID-19, the largest single day total since May. The state also reports that 650,000 Rhode Islanders are fully vaccinated.
- July 23–28: The Newport Folk Festival is held with COVID-19-related protocols: proof of vaccination or negative test is required, capacity is reduced by 50 percent, and a scheduling format spreads its lineup across six days as opposed to one weekend. Artists that appeared at the festival include Beck, Randy Newman, Jason Isbell, and Lucy Dacus.
- July 30: The Newport Jazz Festival begins, enforcing COVID-19 related protocols similar to those of the folk festival, but is held in its traditional three-day format as opposed to the folk festival's six-day format. Artists that appeared include Mavis Staples, Christian McBride, Kamasi Washington, and Charles Lloyd.

==== August ====
- August 2: For the first time since May 2021, Rhode Island reaches an average of over 100 new COVID-19 cases / 100,000 people over a seven-day span, characterizing the state as having a "high transmission" of COVID-19 by the Centers for Disease Control (CDC) standards.
- August 10: Governor McKee announces that all Rhode Island health care workers will need to be fully vaccinated by October 1. On the same day, McKee says there is "no plan" to enforce an indoor mask mandate despite a rise in hospitalizations.
- August 11: Rhode Island becomes the state with the largest number of COVID-19 cases per capita. As of this date, about 14.8% of the population has contracted COVID-19 during some point of the pandemic.
- August 12: Governor McKee's administration announces that masks will be required for state employees and visitors inside state buildings "until the state experiences a marked and sustained decline in the transmission of COVID-19".
- August 16:
  - As case numbers continue to rise from the Delta variant, Rhode Island reopens two of its COVID-19 testing sites due to "increased demand".
  - Providence mayor Jorge Elorza announces that all Providence city workers will need to be vaccinated against COVID-19 by October 1. If an individual chooses to not get vaccinated, they will need to submit a negative COVID-19 test result each week.
- August 19: Governor McKee issues an executive order to mandate masks in all schools for the fall. This order comes two days after McKee says that while he supports a statewide mask mandate for schools, individual communities should decide whether a mask mandate is necessary.
- August 20:
  - Providence mayor Jorge Elorza announces that PVDFest, an arts festival located in downtown Providence that often attracts 100,000 people a year, is canceled due to growing COVID-19 concerns fueled by the Delta variant. The event was scheduled to take place September 25–26.
  - The Providence Performing Arts Center holds a concert by John Cafferty and the Beaver Brown Band and Southside Johnny and the Asbury Jukes, which marks the first ticketed event held at the center since the pandemic began.
- August 22: The Rhode Island Department of Health releases a tweet warning of the circulation of a fake form bearing its logo, which would exempt the holder from face-covering requirements.
- August 23: As of this date, 70% of Rhode Island's population has been at least partially vaccinated against COVID-19.
- August 25: The Providence Performing Arts Center and eight other performance venues require for all visitors to wear a mask at all times. Furthermore, each visitor must show proof of being fully vaccinated or submit a negative COVID-19 test.

==== September ====
- September 2: As of this date, 65% of Rhode Island's population has been fully vaccinated against COVID-19. It is the fifth state to reach this milestone.
- September 4: WaterFire Providence returns after being canceled last year due to pandemic concerns. The event included a special tribute to "COVID heroes", such as healthcare workers, first responders, and grocery store workers.
- September 7: Governor McKee announces a 75-day extension from the October 1 deadline for workers at Eleanor Slater Hospital and the Rhode Island Veterans' Home to become fully vaccinated. Those that take this extension will be subject to temporary unpaid leave, and if they are still unvaccinated by the end of the 75-day extension deadline, they may be subject to "progressive discipline, up to and including termination for failing to meet legally mandated conditions of employment."
- September 13: Brown University confirms that 82 individuals have tested positive for COVID-19 within the last week, most of which are asymptomatic, leading to numerous restrictions and enforcements. For example, all individuals must get tested twice a week regardless of vaccination status, gatherings are limited to five people, and in-person dining is suspended. However, in-person classes will continue.
- September 15: The University of Rhode Island indefinitely postpones a concert by rapper Polo G. The event was initially planned to take place on September 17.
- September 18: The Providence St. Patrick's Day parade returns after being canceled in 2020 and postponed earlier in 2021 due to COVID-19 concerns.
- September 27: Of the fifty states over the last 14 days, Rhode Island has the lowest COVID-19 death rate per capita and the joint fourth-lowest COVID-19 hospitalization rate per capita.
- September 28: Continuing to dominate in its COVID-19 testing rates, Rhode Island becomes the first state to have a testing rate of over 5 tests per person. As of this date, only two other states have a testing rate over 4 tests per person and three other states have a testing rate of over 3 tests per person. The other 44 states have test rates less than 2.5 tests per person.

==== October ====
- October 5: The number of people hospitalized for COVID-19 in Rhode Island in any given day drops below 100 for the first time since August 13 and the number COVID-19 patients in an intensive care unit drops below 10 for the first time since August 3.
- October 19: As of this date, 70% of Rhode Island's population has been fully vaccinated against COVID-19. On this date, both Rhode Island and Connecticut reach this milestone, with Vermont being the only other state achieving this milestone.
- October 22: Booster doses for the Moderna and Johnson & Johnson doses become available for most Rhode Islanders 18 years and older. According to recent guidelines set by the CDC, any eligible individual seeking to take a Moderna booster dose must have completed their primary vaccine series more than six months ago, for a Johnson & Johnson booster, this time frame is only two months. Furthermore, the CDC is allowing fully vaccinated individuals to get any vaccine of their choice; i.e., they do not necessarily have to get the same vaccine they already received, but they must be eligible for whichever vaccine they want.
- October 25: As of this date, 90% of Rhode Islanders 18 years and older have been at least partially vaccinated against COVID-19.
- October 26: Two employees of the Zambarano campus of Eleanor Slater Hospital, located in Burrillville, test positive for COVID-19. Consequently, the facility enforces stricter protocols, such as issuing a "no-visitation policy" and increasing levels of testing among employees.
- October 28: A federal grand jury indicts six Rhode Islanders for planning to apply for COVID-19 related unemployment insurance benefits through several states, using the identities of other individuals without their permission.

==== November ====
- November 4: The first COVID-19 vaccines are administered to children aged 5 to 11 across Rhode Island. As of this date, individuals in this age group can only receive the Pfizer vaccine with a smaller dose than the one administered to older age groups.
- November 5–7: The Rhode Island Comic Con is held in Providence. The event was not held in 2020 due to the pandemic. An estimated 50,000 people attended the three-day event, and at which mask-wearing was compulsory.
- November 15: As of this date, 80% of Rhode Island's population has been at least partially vaccinated against COVID-19. It is the seventh state to reach this milestone.
- November 16: Rhode Island reports 516 new cases, the highest new single-day case count since April 9. At the weekly state coronavirus briefing, Gov. McKee and Department of Health Director Nicole Alexander-Scott encouraged all Rhode Islanders 18 or older to receive a booster shot of the COVID-19 vaccine as winter approaches and more events begin to occur indoors.

==== December ====
- December 1:
  - Gov. McKee announces that the state is creating an app called 401 Health, which will be released within the next few weeks. According to the Rhode Island Department of Health, the app is capable of displaying vaccination status, including for international travel.
  - For the first time since January 21, Rhode Island records over 1,000 new cases in a single day.
- December 7: For the first time since mid-February, the number of hospitalizations due to COVID-19 in any given day exceed 200.
- December 8: As of this date, 75% of Rhode Island's population has been fully vaccinated against COVID-19. It is the second state to achieve this milestone.
- December 9: Rhode Island surpasses 200,000 COVID-19 cases.
- December 11: Rhode Island confirms its first case of the Omicron variant. The individual, who lives in Providence County and is in their 20s, recently returned from New York, which has at least 20 cases of the variant as of this date. The individual was symptomatic but was not hospitalized, and had completed their primary series of vaccinations, but had yet to receive a booster. In a statement, Gov. McKee noted that "Rhode Island is prepared...this is not cause for panic".
- December 13: As of this date, 85% of Rhode Island's population has been at least partially vaccinated against COVID-19. It is the sixth date to achieve this milestone.
- December 14: A team of researchers from Brown University and Rhode Island Hospital continue to develop a breath test, the Bubbler, to detect COVID-19. A clinical trial that took place between May 2020 and January 2021 indicated that the device is capable of detecting viral RNA. If successful, this form of testing may become more prevalent than PCR testing, as PCR tests can give a positive test result months after infection, an issue that this device is attempting to fix. As of this date, the research team is working on patenting the product, with the date of submission for emergency use authorization being uncertain.
- December 15: Gov. McKee announces a new plan to combat rising cases, hospitalizations, and fatalities in the state. Starting on December 20, masks will be required in large venues, while smaller venues are allowed to choose whether to issue a mask mandate or a vaccine mandate. In addition, 100,000 rapid COVID-19 tests will be distributed for free. With a second case of the Omicron variant being identified, the Rhode Island Department of Health recommends for all individuals, including those who are fully vaccinated, to wear a mask indoors when "community spread is substantial or high".
- December 16: Rhode Island leads the nation in cases per capita over the last week. The last time this happened was in December 2020.
- December 21: The number of deaths resulting from COVID-19 in Rhode Island exceeds 3,000. At his weekly press briefing, Gov. McKee called this a "heartbreaking milestone", with the Rhode Island State House being lit up blue and gold on that night to honor those that died from the disease.
- December 22: Due to a greater demand for testing, two additional COVID-19 testing centers are opened: one at a Bristol storefront and one at the Newport Wharf. Both sites only offer rapid antigen testing and are walk-through sites.
- December 27:
  - Providence College mandates that all students receive a booster dose of a COVID-19 vaccine before the start of the spring semester, which is set to begin on January 18. In addition, each student will be required to submit a negative test result within five days of returning to campus.
  - Rhode Island records 2,379 new COVID-19 cases, a new single-day record and the first time the state recorded over 2,000 single-day cases.
- December 28:
  - Providence mayor Jorge Elorza announces that all Providence employees will be required to be vaccinated, including a booster dose, by the end of February, with no testing alternative being enforced. Those that do not become vaccinated or have an approved exemption will lose their jobs.
  - Lieutenant Gov. Sabina Matos announces that she tested positive for COVID-19 from two rapid tests on separate days. She encouraged Rhode Islanders to get their booster doses, claiming that the additional shot is the reason why her symptoms are mild.
- December 29: For the first time since the beginning of the pandemic, Rhode Island has a weekly case rate of over 1,000 cases / 100,000 individuals: 1,066.5 per 100,000. This equates to over 1% of the population in Rhode Island contracting COVID-19 in the last week.
- December 31: A memo goes out to employees at Eleanor Slater Hospital, saying that COVID-19-positive employees will be allowed to work as long as there is a staffing crisis. Employees will be required to wear N95 masks and must be asymptomatic.

=== 2022 ===
==== January ====
- January 1: The Eleanor Slater Hospital declares a staffing crisis, allowing any employee that has tested positive for COVID-19 with mild or no symptoms to work. Employee protocols are consistent with those outlined in the memo from the previous day and from the Rhode Island Department of Health and the CDC.
- January 2: For the first time since the beginning of the pandemic, Rhode Island has a weekly case rate of over 2,000 cases / 100,000 individuals: 2,033.6 per 100,000. This equates to over 2% of the population in Rhode Island contracting COVID-19 in the last week. This rate is double that from four days prior, and about three times larger than the peak rate from Rhode Island's winter surge of 2020–2021.
- January 4: Gov. McKee remobilizes about 180 of Rhode Island's National Guard members to support vaccination and testing efforts throughout the state. Some of these members are "on the ground" in Central Falls, since it has recently seen long lines at testing sites and extremely high case rates.
- January 5:
  - Rhode Island shortens the waiting period to receive a Pfizer-BioNTech COVID-19 booster dose from six months to five months. This change aligns with recently changed CDC guidelines.
  - At least 400 Rhode Islanders are hospitalized from COVID-19 on this date; this has not happened on any given day since mid-January 2021.
- January 6: For the first time since the beginning of the pandemic, Rhode Island has a weekly case rate of over 3,000 cases / 100,000 individuals: 3,018.6 per 100,000. This equates to over 3% of the population in Rhode Island contracting COVID-19 in the last week.
- January 10:
  - As of this date, 90% of Rhode Island's population has been at least partially vaccinated against COVID-19. It is the fourth state to achieve this milestone.
  - The Rhode Island Department of Health issues a mandate requiring that all visitors to nursing homes and assisted living facilities either be vaccinated or test negative before visiting. Regardless of vaccination status, all visitors will be required to wear masks.
- January 13: Nicole Alexander-Scott announces her resignation as the director of the Rhode Island Department of Health. She will remain in the position for the next two weeks and then will move into a consultation role for the next three months. In a statement, Gov. McKee said he "regretfully accepted" Alexander Scott's resignation and called her "a steady, calm presence for Rhode Island as we've worked together to fight the COVID-19 pandemic."
- January 14: Rhode Island surpasses 300,000 COVID-19 cases.
- January 26: COVID-19 hospitalizations are reported to have declined over a ten-day span from their Omicron peak.

==== February ====
- February 10: COVID-19 cases in Rhode Island over a seven-day span are reported as 90% lower than their Omicron peak. There were 368 new cases reported on Feb. 9, compared to 3,614 on Jan. 9.
- February 11
  - The mask or proof of vaccination requirements for entry into indoor venues and businesses is rescinded by Gov. Dan McKee. The mask mandate for Rhode Island public schools and state buildings such as the Rhode Island State House will expire on March 4. Masks are still required on public transportation and taxis, and in transportation facilities, doctor's offices, nursing homes, assisted care facilities and hospitals.
  - The Rhode Island State House of Representatives and Senate vote in favor of extending McKee's pandemic-related emergency powers for an additional 45 days.
- February 18
  - The Rhode Island Department of Health reports no COVID-19 deaths for the first time since December 8.
  - The New York Times reports that Rhode Island has the lowest hospitalization rate of any of the 50 U.S. states.
- February 22
  - As of this date, 95% of Rhode Island's population has been at least partially vaccinated against COVID-19. It is the third state to achieve this milestone.
  - As of this date, 80% of Rhode Island's population has been fully vaccinated against COVID-19. It is the second state to achieve this milestone.
  - Rhode Island becomes the first state to have a testing rate of over 7 tests per person. As of this date, all other states have a testing rate of less than 6 tests per person.
- February 26: The vaccination site at the Rhode Island Convention Center closes.

==== March ====
- March 1: Rhode Island marks two years since its first COVID-19 case.
- March 4: With case and hospitalization numbers continuing to decline, Gov. McKee and his administration announce a new system of measuring the risk of COVID-19 transmission, adopted from the CDC. Instead of community levels of COVID-19 assessed on solely a case rate, the percentage of hospital beds occupied by COVID-19 patients becomes an additional factor. As of this date, all five Rhode Island counties are able to be placed in the "low" community level, using the new guidelines.
- March 6: For the first time since early-August 2021, the number of hospitalizations due to COVID-19 in any given day drops under 100.
- March 7:
  - The McKee administration announced that as of this date, state-led testing sites will only test people who display COVID-19-like symptoms or have been in close contact with someone that has tested positive for the virus. According to the McKee administration, this action is meant to "transition the management of COVID-19" from a pandemic to an endemic.
  - As of this date, the mask mandate for K-12 schools is terminated for all school districts except Providence and Central Falls.
- March 12: The Newport St. Patrick's Day Parade is held for the first time in two years; the 2020 and 2021 editions had been canceled due to the pandemic.

==== April ====
- April 11:
  - Rhode Island reports the highest seven-day case rate of any state: about 172 cases per 100,000 people. The increase is attributed to the BA.2 subvariant of Omicron, which has caused similar case increases in other northeastern states.
  - The mask mandate for all Providence public schools is terminated as of this date.
- April 5: Ashish Jha, the dean of the Brown University School of Public Health in Providence, begins his appointment as the White House coronavirus response coordinator as part of the White House COVID-19 Response Team. Jha's appointment had been announced on March 17 and he succeeded Jeffrey Zients in the role.
- April 15: Four of Rhode Island's five counties: Bristol, Kent, Newport, and Washington, are reclassified into the "medium" level of COVID-19 concern, as classified by the CDC. While hospitalization and fatality rates remain low in these counties, the case rate in each county had been over 200 cases per 100,000 people in the last week.
- April 19: Both the Rhode Island Public Transit Authority and T. F. Green Airport announce that mask-wearing will become optional, effective immediately. Both of these decisions come after a federal judge in Florida ruled that mask mandates in public transportation be revoked, citing that the CDC "did not follow proper rulemaking policies that left it fatally flawed".
- April 20: The Rhode Island Department of Health announces it will stop reporting positivity rates on its online COVID dashboard.

==== May ====
- May 6: 85 to 100 Rhode Islanders are reported to be hospitalized with COVID-19, the highest number since early March. Less than five of those patients required ventilators or intensive care.
- May 12: As COVID cases rise across the United States due to Omicron variants, Rhode Island and three other New England states are reported to have 50 or more new cases per 100,000 residents over the previous two weeks.
- May 16: Following a rise in cases in densely populated Central Falls, Joseph Wendelken, a spokesman for the Rhode Island Department of Health, observed that COVID-19 is now "an endemic disease" and said "We should expect moderate increases and decreases in our COVID-19 levels over the coming months". He noted that vaccines, treatments and testing resources were now in ample supply and "We don't expect our case numbers and hospitalization numbers to reach the levels of January's surge."
- May 17: Rhode Island reports 1,047 new COVID-19 cases, the first time single-day cases have totaled above 1,000 since February 2.
- May 19: The Centers for Disease Control designates four of Rhode Island's five counties as having high levels of community spread. Only Newport County remains at the medium level.
- May 20: Anthony Fauci, the director of the National Institute of Allergy and Infectious Diseases and the Chief Medical Advisor to the President, delivers the commencement speech for the 2022 graduating class of Roger Williams University. Due to travel commitments, Fauci delivers his speech virtually instead of at the Bristol campus.
- May 24: Students and faculty of the Providence school district return to a mask mandate for indoor school activities due to a sharp increase in the number of cases among students and staff.
- May 26:
  - Gov. McKee announces that the first federally funded "test-to-treat" clinic in the United States will open in Providence. The clinic will provide prescriptions for Paxlovid at no cost.
  - Four of Rhode Island's five counties are down-graded by the CDC from high COVID-19 levels to medium levels; Newport County is upgraded from medium to high.
- May 31:
  - The number of COVID-19 cases in Rhode Island drops from 77.4 per 100,000 people on May 18 to 47 per 100,000 on May 31.
  - The Providence public school system lifts the mask mandate implemented on May 24 following the CDC reducing the community COVID-19 level of Providence County to medium.

==== June ====
- June 2:
  - James McDonald, the interim director of the Rhode Island Department of Health following the resignation of Nicole Alexander-Scott in January, announces his departure from the department for family reasons effective July 29.
  - The CDC downgrades Newport County's COVID-19 community levels from high to medium. All five of Rhode Island's counties have returned to the medium designation they were under before May 19.
- June 20: For the first time since mid-July 2021, there are no individuals on a ventilator due to COVID-19.
- June 21: Rhode Island surpasses 400,000 COVID-19 cases.

==== August ====
- August 11: Rhode Island shifts away from updating COVID-19 data daily, instead developing a weekly update on Thursdays. This change is motivated by the CDC's decision to transition to a similar process.
- August 20: Gov. McKee tests positive for COVID-19, stating that he has "very minor" symptoms and will be working remotely for the next five days.

== Statistics by county ==
COVID-19 pandemic in Rhode Island by county
County	Cases	Deaths	Fatality rate (%)
Bristol County	17,778	193	1.09
Kent County	64,423	572	0.89
Newport County	26,526	106	0.4
Providence County	278,748	2,724	0.98
Washington County	43,077	272	0.63
As of June 25, 2023

== See also ==
- COVID-19 pandemic in the United States
- Living with COVID-19#United States
