= Danial =

Danial may refer to:

== People ==
- Danial Fadzly Abdullah (born 1979), Malaysian former footballer
- Danial Amier (born 1997), Malaysian footballer
- Danny Dyer (born 1977), English actor and television presenter
- Danial Hakimi (born 1963), Iranian director and actor
- Danial Haqim (born 1998), Malaysian footballer
- Danial Ibrahim (born 2004), English cricketer
- Danial Mahini (born 1993), Iranian footballer
- Danial Shahbakhsh (born 2000), Iranian boxer
- Danial Sohrabi (born 2003), Iranian Greco-Roman wrestler
- Ferris Danial (born 1992), Malaysian footballer

== Villages in Iran ==
- Danial, Ardabil
- Danial, Mazandaran

== See also ==
- Daniel (disambiguation)
- Danielle or Danyelle
- Daniyal (disambiguation)
- Danyal (disambiguation)
