= Daniele (disambiguation) =

Daniele is a given name.

Daniele may also refer to:

- Daniele (surname), an Italian surname
- Daniele, Inc., an American food manufacturing company
- Daniele, Greater Poland Voivodeship, Poland, a village

== See also ==
- Daniel (disambiguation)
