= Flyway of Life =

- Directed by: Tomas Koeck
- Written by: Tomas Koeck
- Produced by: Tomas Koeck; Collin Moura; Jon Dodd (advisor); Joseph Alicastro (advisor)
- Narrated by: Gregory Golda
- Cinematography: Tomas Koeck
- Edited by: Tomas Koeck
- Production companies: Silent Flight Studios; Sacred Heart University
- Release date: April 22, 2025
- Running time: 70 minutes
- Country: United States
- Language: English

Flyway of Life is a 2025 American documentary film directed by Tomas Koeck that explores the Atlantic Flyway, one of North America's major migratory bird corridors. The film examines the ecological, cultural, and conservation aspects of the flyway, following species that travel thousands of miles between breeding and wintering grounds along the eastern seaboard of the United States and into the Arctic.

== Synopsis ==
Flyway of Life follows the seasonal journeys of migratory bird species traveling along the Atlantic Flyway, which stretches from the Arctic tundra of northern Canada through the eastern United States, the Caribbean, and into South America. The film shows the biological challenges birds face during migration, including habitat loss, climate change, and human development.

== Production ==
The film was produced by Silent Flight Studios and Sacred Heart University. Principal photography took place across multiple locations along the Atlantic Flyway, including coastal wetlands, barrier islands, and inland forest habitats in the northeastern United States.

The production involved collaboration with conservation organizations, ornithologists, and field researchers to document migratory behavior and environmental conditions. Filming occurred in Costa Rica, the Everglades, and the Arctic Circle with experts such as Garl Harrold. The filmmakers employed long-lens wildlife cinematography and seasonal fieldwork to capture migration events.

== Release and screenings ==
Flyway of Life premiered at the Sacred Heart University Community Theatre in Fairfield, Connecticut. The screening included conservation programming and included discussion on the ecological importance of the Atlantic Flyway.

The film has been screened at environmental events, educational institutions, and conservation forums. Venues include the Explorers Club, the University of Connecticut, the Peabody Essex Museum and more.

An official Canon gallery with photographs taken during production was released with the film, along with a book.

== Reception ==
The film has been noted for its cinematography and educational content, particularly its presentation of migratory species and coastal habitats. Conservation organizations have used the film as a resource to support awareness of migratory bird protection.
