= Daniyal (name) =

Daniyal is a given name and surname which may also refer to:

== Given name ==
=== Nobles ===
- Daniyal Biy (1720–1785), Uzbek ruler of the Khanate of Bukhara
- Daniyal Mirza (1572–1602), Mughal prince, son of Emperor Akbar the Great
- Daniyal Sultan (1809–1871), last ruler of the Elisu Sultanate and Imperial Russian Army and Ottoman Army general-major

=== Others ===
- Daniyal Akhmetov (born 1954), Kazakh politician, former Prime Minister of Kazakhstan
- Daniyal Ametov, Crimean Tatar land-squatting activist in Ukraine
- Daniyal Aziz (born 1965), Pakistani politician, former Minister for Privatisation
- Daniyal Gadzhiyev (born 1986), Kazakhstani born-Dagestani Greco-Roman wrestler, 2012 Olympic bronze medalist
- Daniyal Mueenuddin (born 1963), Pakistani-American author
- Daniyal Raheal (born 1983), Pakistani television actor
- Daniyal Robinson, American collegiate basketball coach
- Daniyal Zahid (born 1994), Pakistani cricketer

== Surname ==
- Ahmed Daniyal (born 1997), Pakistani cricketer
- Muhammad Daniyal, Pakistani politician elected in 2024
- Muḥammad Ibn Dāniyāl (1248–c. 1311), Arab poet and playwright

== See also ==
- Daniyal, a Palestinian Arab village
- Danial (disambiguation), including a list of people with the given name or surname
- Dhanial, a tribe in Pakistan
