= Tomas Koeck =

American filmmaker

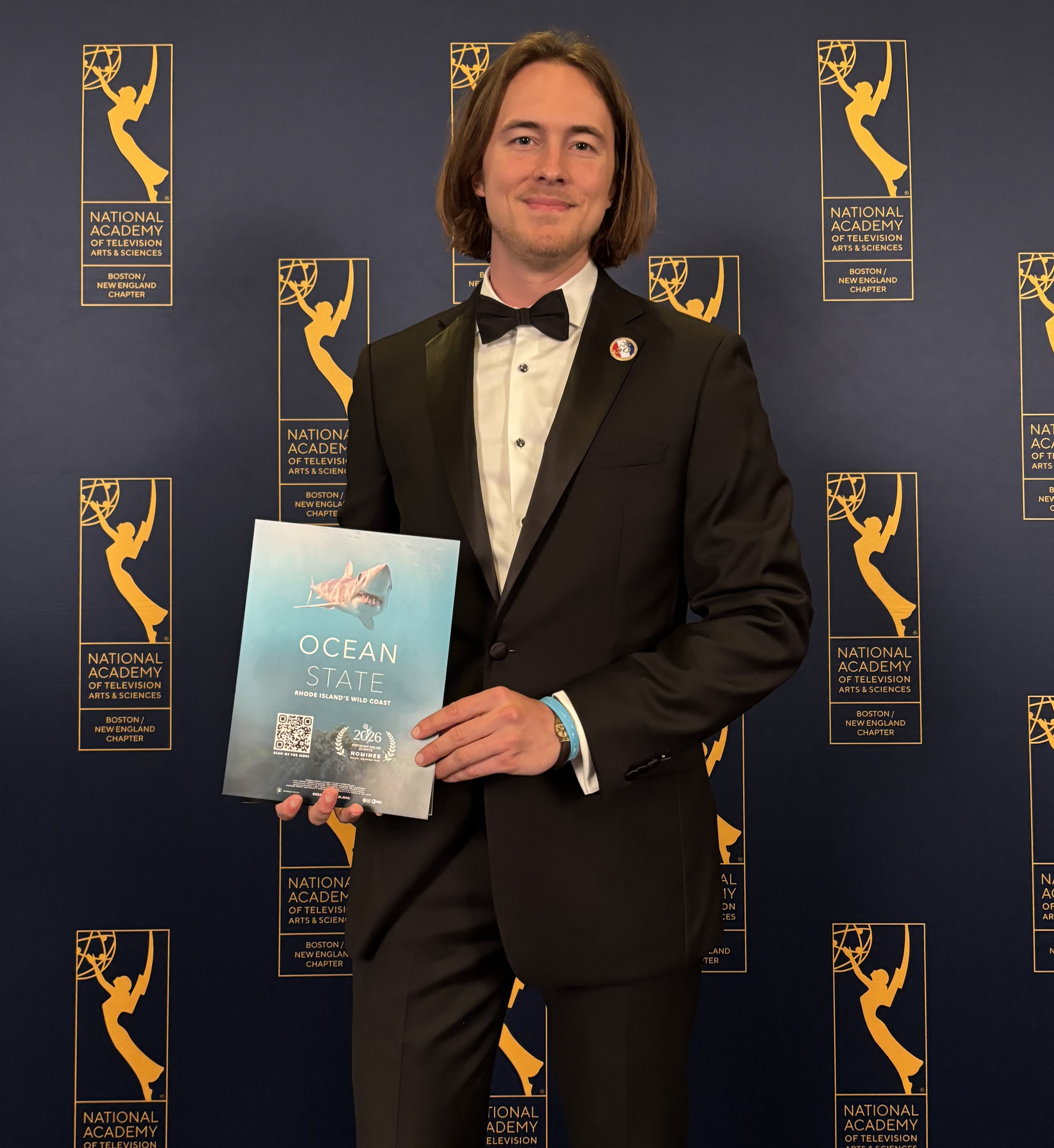
- Tomas Koeck at the 49th annual New England Emmy Awards Gala.
- Born: 1998 (age 27–28)
- Education: Sacred Heart University
- Organization: Silent Flight Studios
- Known for: Conservation, film
- Notable work: Ocean State: Rhode Island's Wild Coast
- Awards: 2026 Explorers Club 50 (EC50) Awardee Sacred Heart University Gold Medal of Excellence
- Honours: Explorers Club Fellow
- Website: www.tomaskoeck.com

Tomas Koeck is an Canon supported, American filmmaker, journalist, photographer, and expeditionist known for his work in National Geographic, PBS Nature, the Smithsonian Channel, and others. He is best known for the feature film, Flyway of Life.

== Education ==
Koeck earned a Bachelor of Arts in media arts and a Master of Arts in journalism from Sacred Heart University, where he began producing wildlife documentaries through the School of Communication, Media, & the Arts.

== Career ==
Koeck is an Emmy-nominated and SPJ award-winning filmmaker, Canon USA-backed photographer, and member of the Explorer's Club. He is the founder and producer of Silent Flight Studios, a 501(c)(3) production company specializing in natural history film and media. Through his work, he has documented conservation issues across North America, with work ranging from great grey owls and gray wolves to great white sharks. He currently is the resident filmmaker of the Atlantic Shark Institute and also has served on the board of the Connecticut Audubon Society.

In 2021, Koeck produced Sentinels of the Boreal in collaboration with the National Audubon Society and Tamron USA. The production focused on the great gray owl.

In 2022, he produced a project called Keepers of the Blue with Canon USA on white sharks off of Guadalupe Island, Baja California.

In 2025, he produced Flyway of Life, a production that focused on board migration along the Atlantic Flyway from Costa Rica to the Arctic Tundra. The production was produced in association with the National Audubon Society and went on tour from 2025 to 2026.

In 2026, he was named an Explorers Club 50 (EC50) Awardee, an honor presented by ROLEX, an international designation given to "fifty people changing the world that the world needs to know about".

In 2026 he began producing Ocean State: Rhode Island's Wild Coast that began airing on PBS in January. The production focuses on southern New England ecosystems.

In 2026 he was nominated for a New England Emmy award for his work on Ocean State: Rhode Island's Wild Coast.

== Awards ==
- 2022, SPJ Excellence in Journalism Award
- 2024, Connecticut SeaGrant Arts Award
- 2025, Fellow National at The Explorers Club
- 2026 Explorers Club 50 (EC50) awardee presented by ROLEX
- 2026 Emmy-Nomination (New England/Boston)
