= Janet Coit =

American lawyer

Administrator of the National Marine Fisheries Service
- Nominee
- President: Joe Biden
- Succeeded by: Emily Menashes (acting)

Director of the Rhode Island Department of Environmental Management
- In office January 2011 – June 8, 2021
- Governor: Lincoln Chafee; Gina Raimondo; Daniel McKee

Personal details
- Education: Dartmouth College (BA); Stanford University (JD)

Janet L. Coit is an American government official who served as the director of the Rhode Island Department of Environmental Management from January 2011 to June 2021. She serves as administrator of the National Marine Fisheries Service.

== Early life and education ==
Coit is a native of Syracuse, New York. She earned a Bachelor of Arts degree in English from Dartmouth College and a Juris Doctor from Stanford Law School.

== Career ==
From 1985 to 1989, Coit was a legislative assistant for Senator Gordon J. Humphrey. From 1989 to 1991, she served as a staffer for the United States Senate Committee on Environment and Public Works and counsel for the department from 1994 to 1997. She also served as environmental counsel for Senator John Chafee. She was the Rhode Island state director of The Nature Conservancy from 2001 to 2010. She served as director of the Rhode Island Department of Environmental Management from January 2011 to June 2021.
