= Justin Grubb =

American filmmaker

- Born: 1991 (age 34–35)
- Education: Miami University
- Organization: Running Wild Media
- Known for: Conservation, film
- Notable work: Ocean State: Rhode Island's Wild Coast
- Honours: 2026 Explorers Club 50 (EC50) Awardee
- Website: https://www.runningwild.media/

Justin Grubb (born circa 1991) is an American biologist, conservationist and filmmaker known for his work in National Geographic, BBC Earth and independent film Hellbent.

== Early life and education ==
Grubb was born in the US and found interest in conservation and biology at a young age. He earned a Bachelor of Science in biology from Bowling Green State University and a Master of Biology from Miami University.

== Career ==
Grubb is a filmmaker and co-founder of Running Wild Media. His work focuses on wildlife, conservation, and science communication. He combines formal training in biology with filmmaking and photography to document environmental issues and endangered species.

Grubb has conducted international wildlife field research and has experience in both formal and informal science education. His films and media projects are used to support conservation initiatives and public outreach. He has worked in remote and extreme environments to study and document critically endangered wildlife.

In 2023, Grubb produced segments for National Geographic's America's National Parks. In 2026, he began a role as associate producer to PBS: Ocean State: Rhode Island's Wild Coast. In 2024, he was inducted into the DACC Hall of Fame. In 2026, he was named an Explorers Club 50 (EC50) Awardee, an honor presented by ROLEX, an international designation given to "fifty people changing the world that the world needs to know about".

== Awards and recognition ==
- "Wild to Inspire" Award, Nat Geo Wild
- Emerging League Member, International League of Conservation Photographers
- 2024 DACC Hall of Fame Inductee
- 2025, Fellow National at The Explorers Club
- 2026 EC50 awardee presented by ROLEX
