= Garl Harrold =

American wilderness guide and expeditionist

Garl Harrold is an American wilderness guide, naturalist and expeditionist known for his work in the Florida Everglades. He is the founder of Garl's Coastal Kayaking, a guiding operation specializing in kayaking and wildlife expeditions that has consistently guided for National Geographic, the BBC, the National Audubon Society, and others in and around Everglades National Park. Harrold has served as a location expert and guide for documentary productions and media organizations covering the Everglades ecosystem.

== Career ==
Harrold has worked for many years as a wilderness guide in South Florida, leading kayaking and backcountry expeditions through wetlands, mangrove forests, and coastal waters of the Everglades for wildlife and travel productions. These have included projects associated with National Geographic, CNN, and other documentary producers.

Harrold has been described as a long-time guide in the Everglades and has led tours for visitors from around the world. Writers and photographers documenting the region have frequently used him as a field guide while researching wildlife and environmental stories.

In 2022, Harrold was the central guide for the National Geographic: America's National Parks series.

In 2023, Harrold and Florida Audubon led an expedition after Hurricane Irma to assess damage. On this research trip, he and Dr. Jerry Lorenz came upon over one hundred flamingos believed to have been blown in by the storm from the Yucatán. He is credited as one of the individuals responsible for locating and discovering the return of the flamingo to the Florida Everglades.

In 2025, the film, Flyway of Life covered the return of the flamingos featuring Harrold's and Audubon Florida's work.

== Media appearances ==
Harrold has appeared in news coverage and documentary projects related to tourism and conservation in South Florida. During the United States federal government shutdown of 2018–2019, he was interviewed by PBS News Hour about the economic effects of the shutdown on Everglades tour operators. He was a central figure in the New York Times article "Tears for the Magnificent and Shrinking Everglades, a 'River of Grass' ".

== Other work ==
Harrold has collaborated with wildlife photographers, conservation writers, and filmmakers documenting the ecology of the Everglades. He still maintains a tour business for tourists as well.

He has also contributed as a field guide and advisor to environmental and documentary projects focused on coastal ecosystems and wildlife in South Florida.

== See also ==
- Everglades National Park
- National Geographic Society
- National Audubon Society
