= Emily Menashes =

American government official

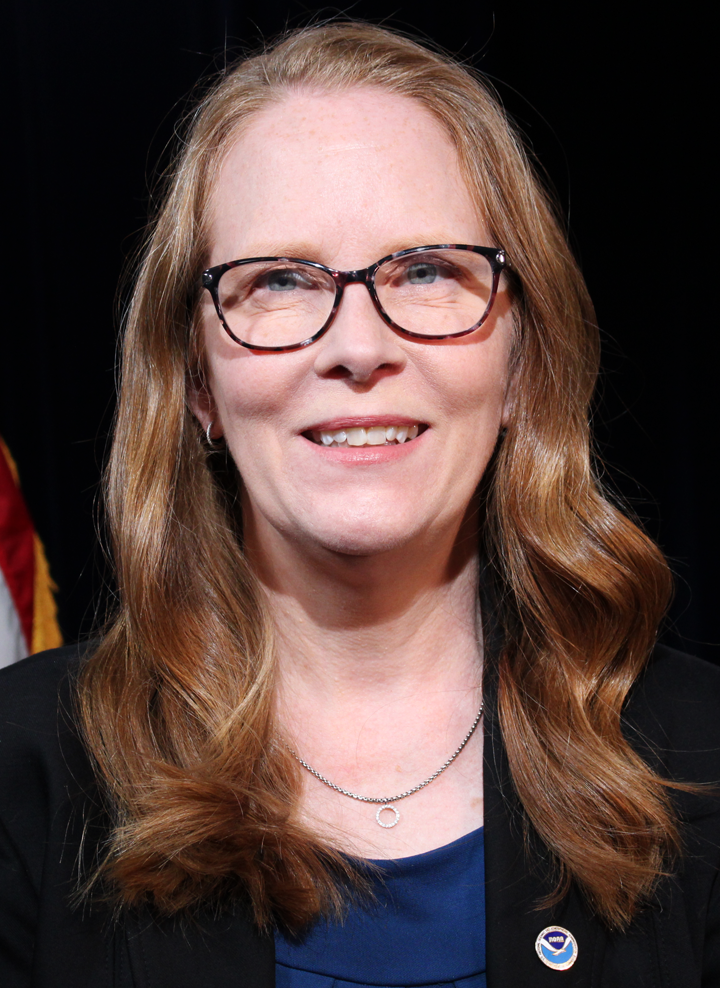
- Menashes in 2023

Acting Administrator of the National Marine Fisheries Service
- Incumbent
- Assumed office 2025
- President: Donald Trump
- Succeeded by: Janet Coit

Personal details
- Education: Bowdoin College; Oregon State University

Emily Menashes is an American government official serving as the Deputy Assistant Administrator for Operations for the National Marine Fisheries Service (NMFS) since 2023. She was temporarily acting as the NOAA Assistant Administrator for Fisheries in 2025.

== Early life and education ==
Menashes grew up in Pennsylvania and Connecticut. She attended Bowdoin College, where she earned a B.A. in biology and environmental studies. She later obtained a M.S. in marine resource management from Oregon State University.

== Career ==
Menashes began her career as a Knauss Sea Grant Fellow at National Marine Fisheries Service (NMFS). She remained with the agency for the next 17 years, working in the Office of Protected Resources and the Office of Sustainable Fisheries. During this time, she served as deputy director in the Office of Sustainable Fisheries, where she handled national policy and regulatory issues related to marine fishery resources and seafood management.

Menashes later held leadership positions across multiple National Oceanic and Atmospheric Administration (NOAA) line offices, including NOAA Fisheries, National Ocean Service (NOS), and Office of Oceanic and Atmospheric Research (OAR). At NOS, she served as chief of staff, and she also held the role of senior policy advisor and acting NOAA deputy chief of staff. She completed a one-year detail as deputy director for ocean and coastal policy with the Council on Environmental Quality.

Menashes was deputy assistant administrator for programs and administration at OAR. In September 2023, she was appointed deputy assistant administrator for operations at NMFS. In this role, she oversees the agency's budget and facilities operations, along with the several headquarters offices. In early 2025, Menashes began performing the duties of acting assistant secretary for oceans and atmosphere and acting assistant administrator for NFMS, succeeding Janet Coit.

== Personal life ==
Menashes resides in Silver Spring, Maryland.
