= Sacred Heart University Community Theatre =

Theatre in Fairfield, Connecticut

Coordinates: 41.1415°N 73.2567°W

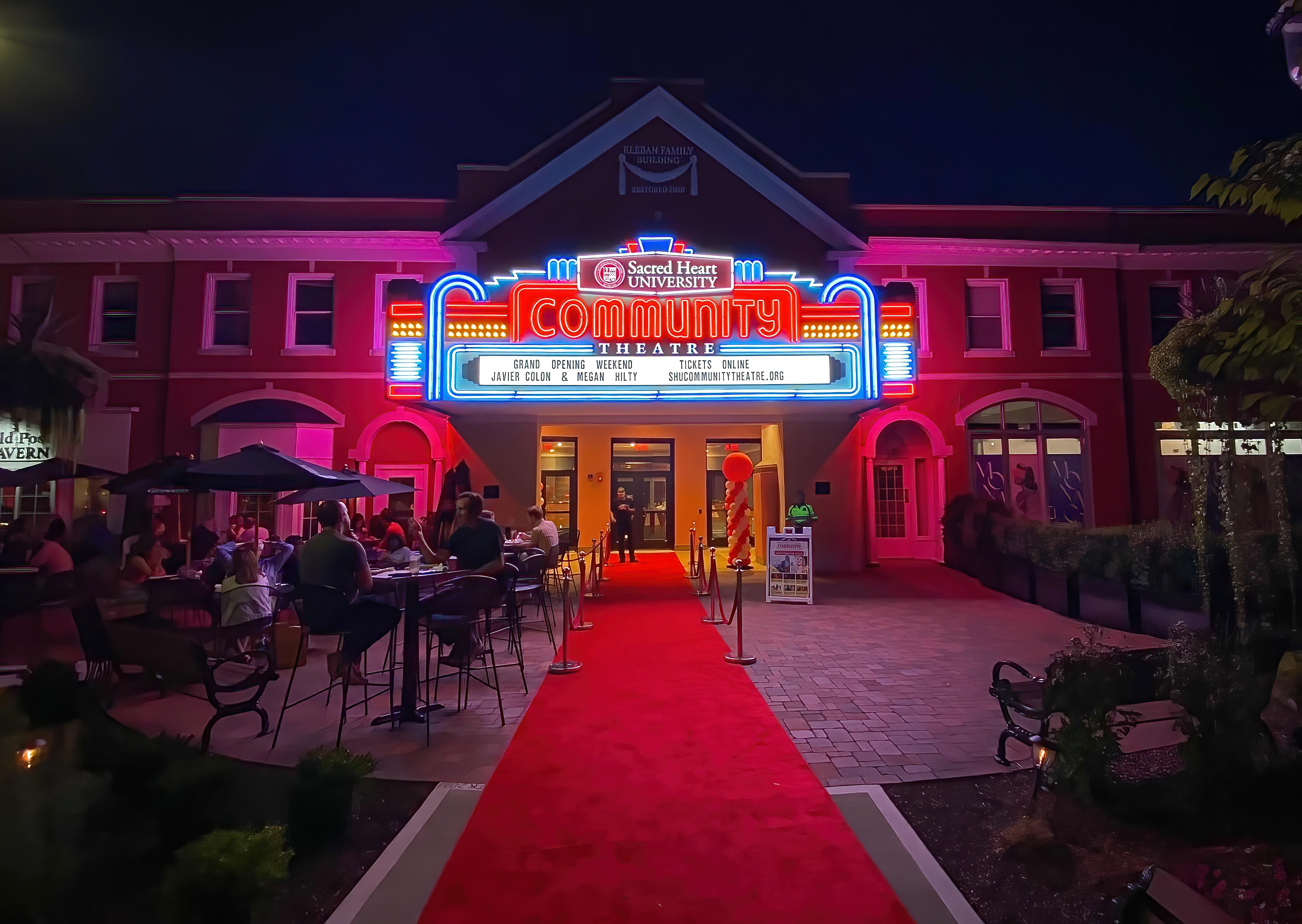
- The Sacred Heart University Community Theatre in 2022.
- Location: Fairfield, Connecticut, U.S.

History
- Built: 1920

Site notes
- Area: 3,000 square feet
- Governing body: Sacred Heart University
- Website: https://shucommunitytheatre.org/

Sacred Heart University Community Theatre (2020–present), located on Fairfield's main street, 1424 Post Road. is a university-run multi-disciplinary Theatre in Fairfield, Connecticut. It was formerly known as the Community Film Institute (2009–2011) and also as Fairfield Community Theatre Foundation (2001–2009). In 2019, Kleban Properties bought the long-vacant theater and leased the space to Sacred Heart University.

== Staff and volunteers ==
Since 2021, executive director Matt Oestreicher, a music producer based out of the metropolitan area, has brought in a number of diverse industry professionals including Joseph Gray (now retired from his previous venture at The Apollo) as production manager, actor Gary Lindemann operations manager, Tim Walsh (from the band, The Stepkids) as technical director and many others. Sacred Heart University also employs students to help with different aspects at the theatre including box office.

== Series and programs ==
The foundation ran a number of programs using the theater under previous ownership and management:

- Jazz Series - 2023 Season Artists include Marc Ribot, Al Dimeola, Geoff Keezer, and more.
- Broadway on Post Series - 2023 Season Artists include The Doo Wop Project, Linda Eder, Melissa Errico, and more.
- Singer/Songwriter Series - the 2023 Season Artists include Edwin McCain, Beth Orton, Stephen Kellogg, Richard Shindell & Lucy Kaplansky and more.
- Rock Series - The venue hosts several rock shows a year, 2023 Season Artists include Willie Nile, Average White Band, Walter Trout, Darlene Love, Tab Benoit & The Rebirth Brass Band, and more.
- Comedy Series - 2023 Season Artists include Pinky Patel, Drew Lynch, Gary Gulman, Alonzo Bodden, Manhattan Comedy Night, and more.
- World Music Series - 2023 Season Artists include Red Baraat, Ladysmith Black Mambazo, Cherish the Ladies, Dervish and more.
- Classical Series
- Local Legends
- Century of Cinema -- examines the development of film and the progression of cinema.
- Big Screen Blockbusters
- Film Events with Q&A: The community theatre hosts major and independent film screenings. Some noteworthy events include the premiere of the Hartford Whalers documentary, Flyway of Life which sold out the venue, and the Black History Month film series.
- Family Film Series
- Thought Leader Series
- Educational Programming
- The Movie Maker program

== History ==
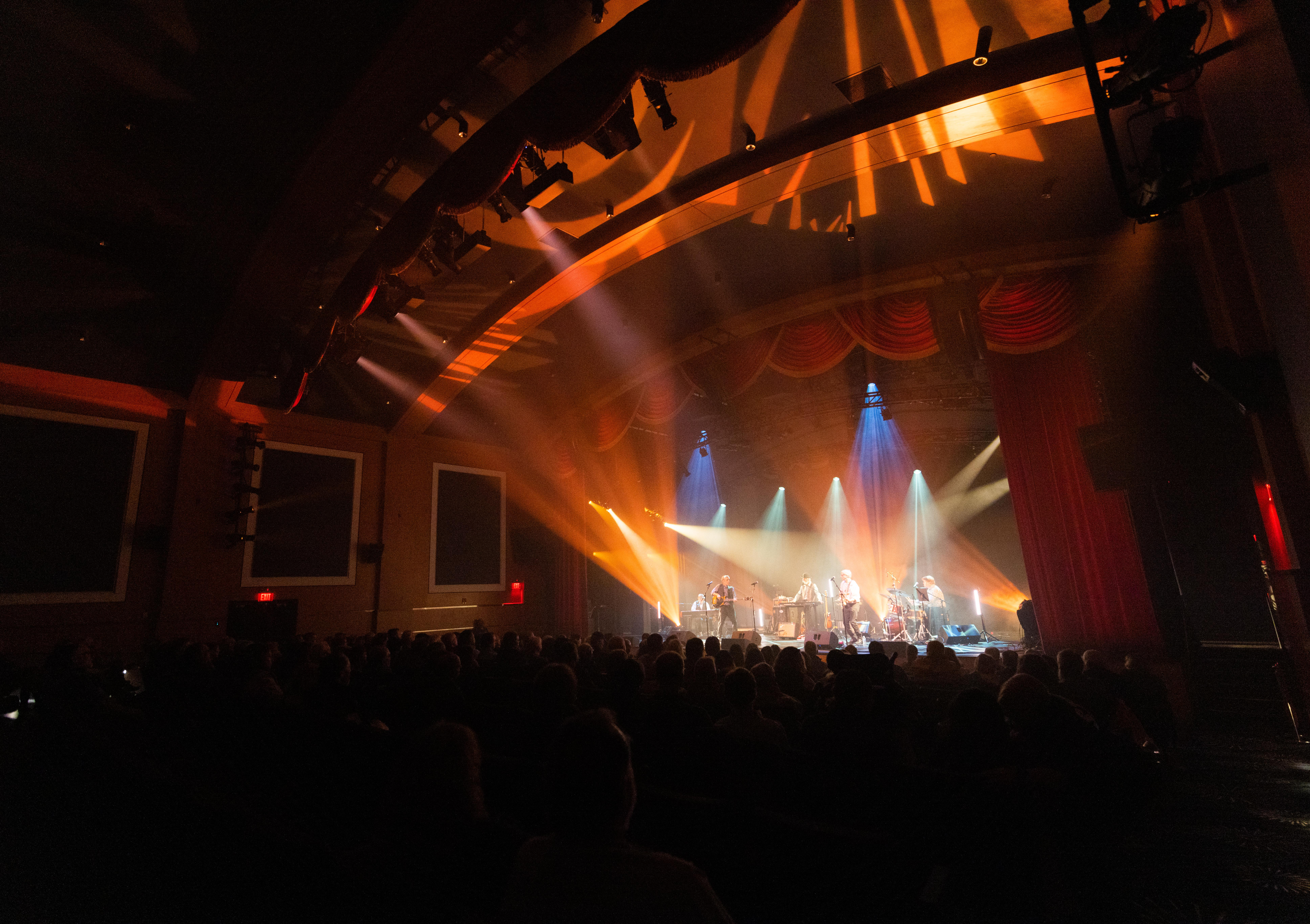
Show day at the Sacred Heart University Community Theatre in 2022

The theater first began operation in 1920 as a local moviehouse. It added a second screen room in 1979. There are many stories regarding the theater's changing construction. For instance, behind one of the balconies, there used to be an office. It was accompanied with a lounge, but in 1950, the owner decided to make the office bigger, compromising the lounge. A lift would raise an organ out of the basement and onto the stage. The theater was also home to stage performances in the past but was converted into a movie theater in the 1970s.

Starting in the late 1990s, the Loew's chain attempted to run it as an art house, but failed and closed it in spring 2001.

Leo Redgate, a real estate investor in town who remembered seeing "Jaws" at the moviehouse as a kid, decided it would be good for the community to revive the place. He created the theater foundation, invested his own money to fix up the building, and rounded up volunteers, including high school students. By the end of 2001, the theater was open again. The theatre's final public showing was held on September 8, 2011.

The Community Theatre was bought by Sacred Heart University.
