= Ocean State: Rhode Island's Wild Coast =

American documentary series

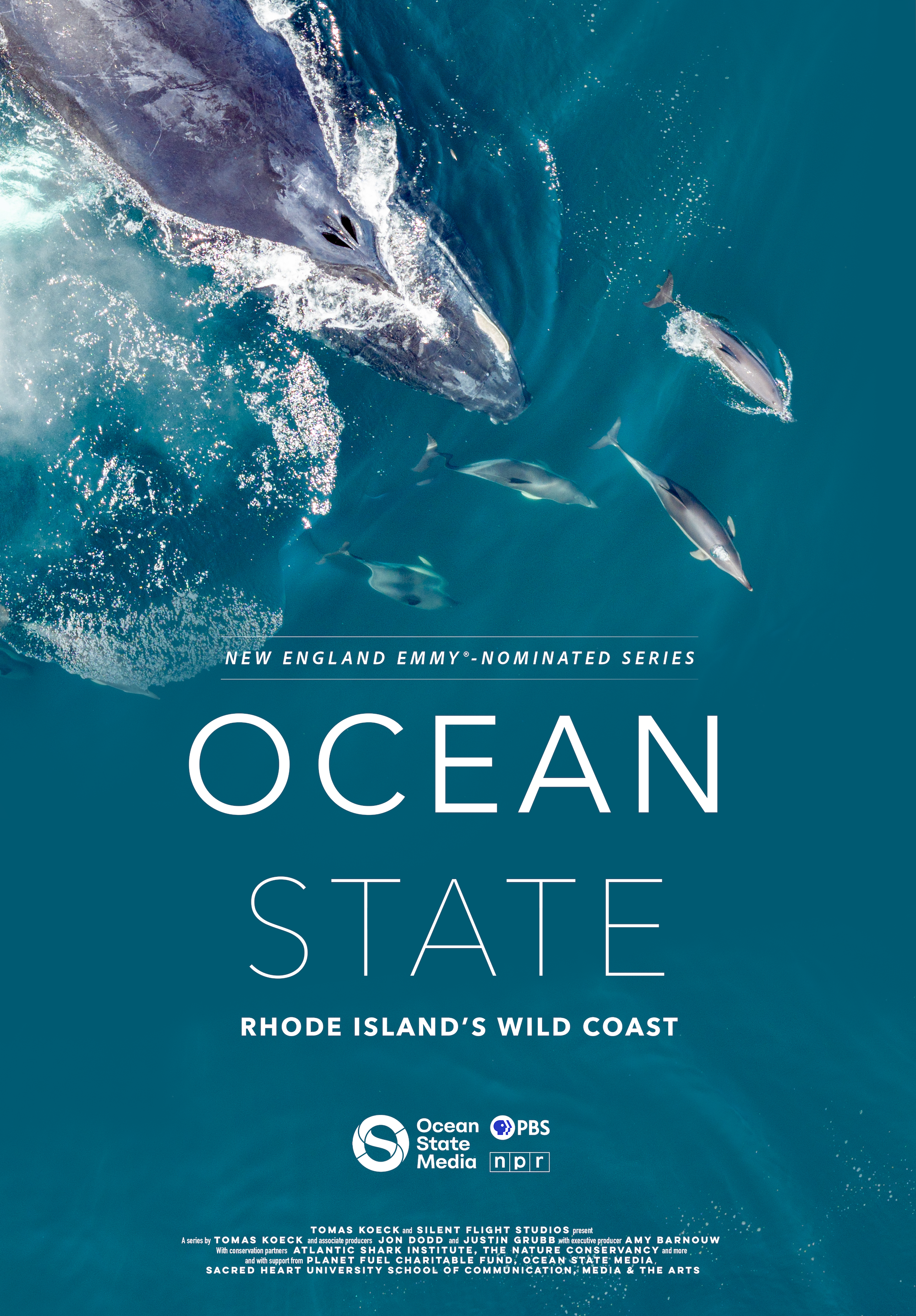
- Alternative poster
- Written by: Tomas Koeck
- Directed by: Tomas Koeck
- Narrated by: Gregory Golda
- Country of origin: United States
- Original language: English

Production
- Executive producers: Amy Barnouw (Silent Flight Studios); Barbara Dury (Ocean State Media)
- Producers: Tomas Koeck; Justin Grubb; Jon Dodd
- Cinematography: Tomas Koeck
- Editor: Tomas Koeck
- Production companies: Silent Flight Studios; Running Wild Media

Original release
- Network: PBS
- Release: 2025 – present

Ocean State: Rhode Island's Wild Coast (aka Ocean State) is an American documentary film series, produced by Silent Flight Studies with support from Ocean State Media Group. The series explores the marine and coastal ecosystems of Rhode Island, highlighting the state's role in the broader New England ocean environment. The first teaser was revealed in fall of 2025.

The series pilot, Chasing Fins, began airing on PBS member stations in 2025 and features appearances of both prominent and local marine scientists, conservationists, and underwater cinematographers documenting the region's biodiversity and environmental challenges. Episode 1 was released in early 2026.

== Background ==
The Ocean State series focuses on the intersection of wildlife, science, and conservation along the Rhode Island coast. Each episode presents different aspects of the state's marine ecology, from migratory species along the Atlantic Flyway to local conservation initiatives involving universities, research institutes, and environmental organizations.

Cinematography for the series combines underwater and aerial filming, including drone and pole-camera footage of coastal and pelagic species.

== Production ==
Ocean State is produced by Silent Flight Studies and has support from Ocean State Media Group, Planet Fuel Charitable Fund and Sacred Heart University. The film is in association with regional conservation partners, including the Atlantic Shark Institute and The Nature Conservancy. Filming has taken place across Rhode Island's coastline, offshore waters, and estuarine systems.

The series uses Canon Cinema EOS systems and underwater housings for field production. Set to feature four seasons, the first episode was broadcast on Rhode Island PBS in December, and the series is expected to continue until 2027. An accompanying feature-length film is planned following the series.

== Broadcast and release ==
The series began airing in 2025 on PBS member stations, including WSBE-PBS Rhode Island, and is available for streaming on PBS.org and the PBS app.

Episode Number	Episode Name	Date Released	Network	Runtime	Director	Producer(s)
1.0 (pilot)	"Chasing Fins"	August 22, 2025	WSBE / PBS	15 min	Tomas Koeck	Tomas Koeck
1.1	"Secrets of the Seagrass"	January 9, 2026	WSBE / PBS	24 min	Tomas Koeck	Tomas Koeck, Justin Grubb
1.2	"Tides of Change"	June 15, 2026	WSBE / PBS	28	Tomas Koeck	Tomas Koeck
1.3	"Sky, Sea, and Shore"	October 12, 2026	WSBE / PBS	--	Tomas Koeck	Tomas Koeck
1.4	"Offshore Magic"	(Expected) Winter 2026	WSBE / PBS	--	--	--
1.5	"Ocean State"	2027	WSBE / PBS	--	--	--

== Reception ==
Early episodes of Ocean State have been noted by conservation groups and local media for their emphasis on New England's marine life and for showcasing Rhode Island's role in coastal conservation.

Environmental organizations such as the Nature Conservancy have partnered with the project and have cited the series as an example of regional filmmaking supporting public education about climate and biodiversity.

In 2026, the pilot for the series, Chasing Fins was nominated for a New England Emmy in the Science and Environment, short and long form, category.
