= Daniel (department store) =

English department store chain

Coordinates: 51.4820°N 0.6097°W

W. J. Daniel & Company Limited
- Trade name: Daniel
- Company type: Private
- Industry: Retail
- Founded: Ealing, London (1901)
- Founder: W. J. Daniel
- Headquarters: Windsor, England, United Kingdom
- Number of locations: 1
- Area served: United Kingdom
- Products: Luxury goods
- Number of employees: c. 200 (2011)
- Website: danielstores.co.uk

W. J. Daniel & Company Limited, trading as Daniel, is an English department store situated in central Windsor. A former Royal Warrant holder to the Queen Elizabeth II, it was established in 1901 by Walter James Daniel and is privately owned.

The store is the largest department store in Windsor and also contains three restaurants, including Heidi and Foggs. While the store did used to contain a YO! Sushi., this was shut down and replaced in 2024. The space is now inhabited by the "Cattle Grid" steak restaurant.

== Former locations ==
- Cardiff
- Chiswick (dedicated bedroom store)
- Ealing (closed on 1 June 2025)
- Ebbw Vale
- Newbury
- Reading
- Slough
