= George Floyd protests in Rhode Island =

2020 civil unrest after the murder of George Floyd

- Part of George Floyd protests
- Date: May 30 – June 20, 2020 (3 weeks)
- Location: Rhode Island, United States
- Caused by: Police brutality; Institutional racism against African Americans; Reaction to the murder of George Floyd; Economic, racial and social inequality

This is a list of protests in Rhode Island related to the murder of George Floyd.

== Locations ==
=== Bristol ===
A protest of more than 1,000 people was held beginning at Colt State Park and ending at Independence Park on June 6.

=== Burrillville ===
On June 11, about 50 people marched to Harrison Mill Pond from Eccleston Field and lied face down on the sidewalk with their hands behind their backs for eight minutes and forty-six seconds.

=== Jamestown ===
About 100 people participated in a rally in support of Black Lives Matter at East Ferry Landing on June 16.

=== Narragansett ===
On June 7, around 300 people rallied in support of Black Lives Matter by the Narragansett Seawall.

=== New Shoreham ===
A small "Walk for Justice" protest organized by Block Island residents was held on June 4 outside the Block Island Historical Society.

=== Newport ===
More than 100 people converged on Liberty Square in Newport on June 1, 2020, to honor George Floyd. The protests took places only blocks away from the Newport waterfront, a major center of the American slave trade. A second protest was held in Newport on June 6, with several thousand protesters in attendance. A third protest was held at Miantonomi Memorial Park on June 13.

=== North Kingstown ===
On June 7, around 300 people gathered by the Stop and Shop Plaza on Ten Rod Road to support Black Lives Matter.

=== Providence ===
On May 30, nearly 10,000 people protested at the State House lawn at a peaceful rally organized by Black Lives Matter Rhode Island. Later that night the building was vandalized.

On June 1, rioters set a police car on fire and looted several stores. Some rioters also broke into the Providence Place Mall and stole items. At least 65 people were taken into custody. In late June, Providence police arrested two members of the Warwick rap group Waraq on charges of inciting violence in connection with the mall break-in. Following the riot, businesses and art studios in downtown Providence painted and displayed plywood murals in support of the Black Lives Matter movement.

On June 2, a 9 p.m.–6 a.m. curfew was subsequently imposed upon the City of Providence beginning June 2, and similar curfews were implemented in several cities and towns throughout the state including the neighboring cities of Central Falls, Cranston, East Providence, Pawtucket and Warwick.

On June 5, a second large protest took place at the State House and Kennedy Plaza with 10,000 people in attendance. After the 9 p.m. curfew, Governor Gina Raimondo made an unannounced appearance to address what remained of the crowd, and joined them in a prayer. No violence and few arrests were reported at the event or its aftermath. The Providence curfew was lifted the next day. On June 19, Rhode Island Department of Health director Nicole Alexander-Scott said there were no cases of COVID-19 reported in Rhode Island over the previous two weeks that were attributable to participation at the June 5 protest.

A third protest in Providence was held on June 13 and was organized by a local youth organization. The protesters marched from Burnside Park to the state house, and were joined by a separate march organized by students at Brown University's Alpert Medical School.

A march organized by the Providence Student Union was held in Providence on Juneteenth, with a student group of about 1,000 participants marching from Central High School to the state house. A candlelight vigil was held later that night at Burnside Park to honor deceased Black transgender individuals. Those participating in the vigil then marched to Congdon Street Baptist Church and stopped along the way to pay respects at a marker commemorating the Snowtown Riot in 1831, in which a Black neighborhood in Providence was attacked for four days by a white mob. A women's march was held on June 20, wherein protesters marched from Burnside Park to the state house, and were joined there by Alexander-Scott, who spoke to the crowd.

=== South Kingstown ===
A protest was held in the village of Wakefield on June 8. A second youth-led protest was held on June 16, with a group of several hundred protesters kneeling on Kingstown Road for eight minutes and 46 seconds.

=== Westerly ===
On June 5, around 50 people gathered on the steps of the post office to peacefully protest.

=== Woonsocket ===
On June 3, a group of protesters in Woonsocket gathered with the Police Chief outside the police station demanding change. The protest was held by the Woonsocket Alliance to Champion Hope, also known as The Watch Coalition. Protesters also marched, chanted and carried signs though the town.
