= Atlantic Shark Institute =

American environmental organization

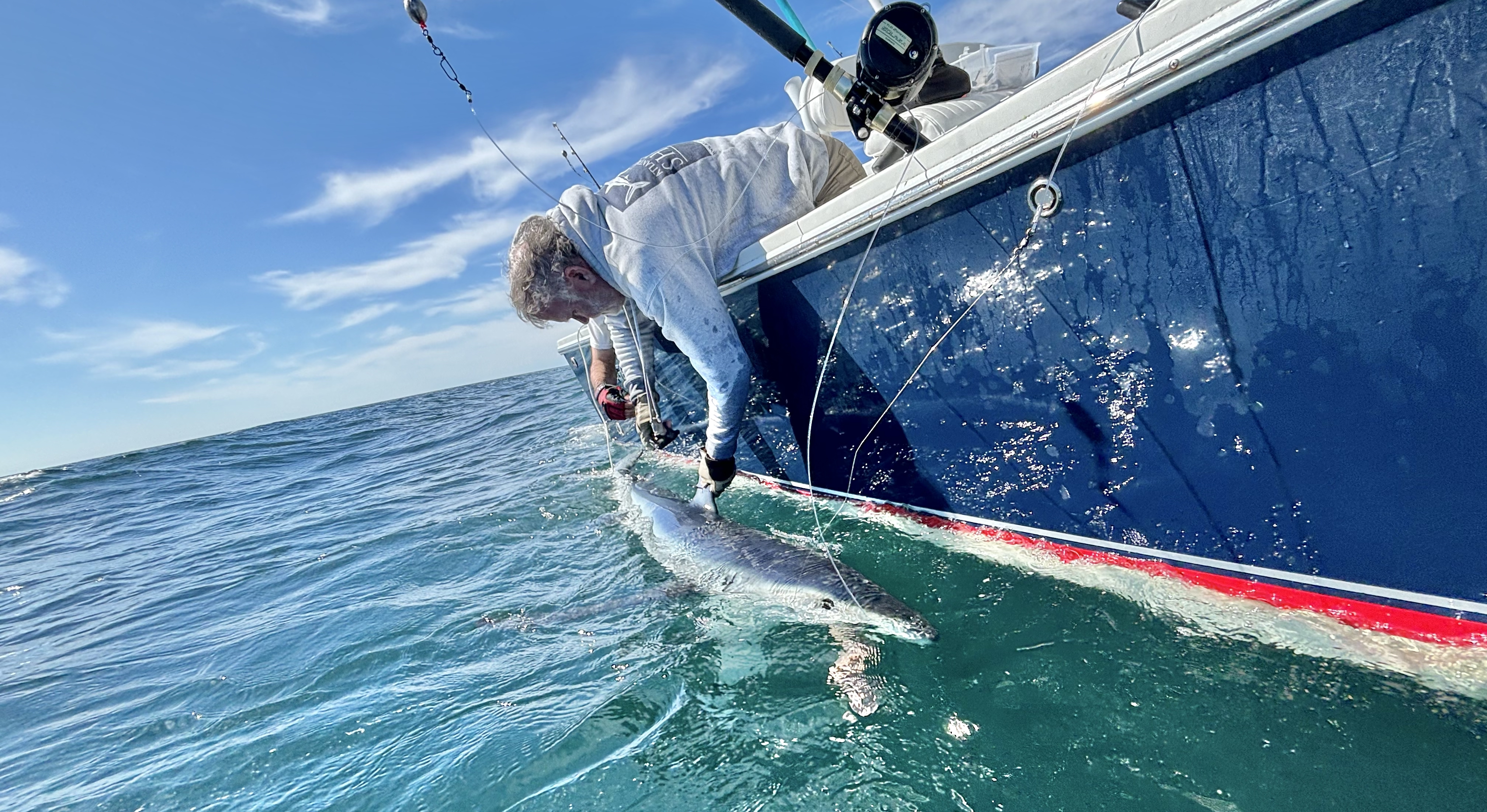
- A blue shark being released
- Abbreviation: ASI
- Formation: 2018
- Purpose: Scientific Research, Conservation, Marine Biology, Shark Research
- Headquarters: Rhode Island, United States
- Executive Director: Jon Dodd
- Affiliations: NOAA, Roger Williams University, Rhode Island Department of Environmental Management
- Website: https://www.atlanticsharkinstitute.org

The Atlantic Shark Institute (ASI) is an American non-profit environmental organization dedicated to research and conservation of shark species and shark research. The ASI primarily focuses on biology, survival and sustainability of sharks in the northwest Atlantic Ocean.

Founded by shark biologist Jon Dodd, the Atlantic Shark Institute is the Principal Investigator (PI) on a number of research projects while also serving as Co-Principal Investigator (Co-PI) with other collaborators [2] including the RI Department of Environmental Management, National Oceanic and Atmospheric Administration (NOAA), and others. It carries out research on multiple shark species including shortfin mako, great white, thresher, blue, porbeagle, spinner, sand tiger and others.

Additionally, the Atlantic Shark Institute is a member the New England White Shark Research Consortium, a group of research organizations that are located throughout New England and Canada and focus on the science and sustainable management of the white shark within its northwest range. The ASI has tagged approximately 50 white sharks and that data will assist in understanding migration patterns that will help the worlds scientists learn about climate science and its effect on the oceans apex predators.

The Atlantic Shark Institute were co-authors on a groundbreaking study on newborn spinner sharks being found in Rhode Island waters. ASI affiliated fishermen caught a young spinner shark that still had a partially healed umbilical wound, meaning this shark was recently born. The discovery was hailed by Forbes as being an example of successful citizen science.

== Research ==
The Atlantic Shark Institute (ASI) conducts comprehensive research on various shark species to enhance understanding and promote conservation efforts. A key initiative is the deployment of an acoustic shark array in Rhode Island waters, which began in 2019 in collaboration with the Rhode Island Department of Environmental Management . This array utilizes acoustic receivers to monitor tagged animals, including sharks, providing valuable data on their presence, residency, and migration patterns. The ASI array expanded to 20 receivers in 2025, increasing the scope and effectiveness of this research.

The ASI also leads a study on white sharks (Carcharodon carcharias) off of Southern New England as well as North Carolina, focusing on their movement ecology in the western North Atlantic. By tagging these sharks during various migration phases, researchers aim to understand their broad and fine-scale movements along the U.S. eastern seaboard. This research is crucial for the sustainable management of white sharks, which are listed as vulnerable on the IUCN Red List. In 2025, the Atlantic Shark Institute captured the first ever footage of a juevenile white shark in Rhode Island with a baited remote underwater video system (BRUVS).

The Atlantic Shark Institute (ASI) conducts extensive research on shortfin mako sharks (Isurus oxyrinchus), focusing on their behavior, ecology, and conservation. ASI employs advanced tagging techniques, including acoustic and satellite transmitters, to monitor their movements and residency patterns in the northwest Atlantic. Collaborating with local fishermen, ASI has successfully tagged numerous juvenile makos in Rhode Island waters, providing valuable data on their migratory routes and habitat use .

== License Plate ==
In 2023, the Atlantic Shark Institute (ASI), a Rhode Island-based nonprofit dedicated to shark research and conservation, introduced a specialty license plate featuring a mako shark design. The initiative quickly gained popularity, with over 1,000 pre-orders—the minimum required for production—secured within hours of the announcement. By May 2023, more than 4,000 plates had been ordered, setting a record for the fastest-selling charity plate in Rhode Island's history.

The success of the program led to the expansion of plate offerings to include combination, commercial, and motorcycle plates as well. As of May 2025, over 10,000 shark-themed plates have been distributed across various vehicle types making it the most popular charity plate in RI history. The funds generated from these sales have contributed significantly to ASI's mission of advancing shark research, conservation, acoustic telemetry, BRUVs research, shark tagging, tracking endangered species and more.

== Media ==
The Atlantic Shark Institute has appeared in news articles, films, documentaries, and newsletters when reporting on subjects relating to sharks and conservation. Scientists and studies from the Atlantic Shark Institute have been featured on National Geographic, Shark Week, and other major networks. Recently the Atlantic Shark Institute helped create and pass a Rhode Island law allowing the organization to produce charity plates. The license plate has since broke two state records, selling nearly 3,000 plates in the span of four days. The Atlantic Shark Institute was the center feature for a pilot of the Ocean State: Rhode Island's Wild Coast series premiering on Ocean State Media / PBS, the episode is titled "Chasing Fins".
