= Daniyal Ametov =

Crimean Tatar activist in Ukraine

- Occupation: Activist
- Known for: Member of NGO Advet

Daniyal Ametov is a Crimean Tatar land-squatting activist in Ukraine, and a member of the NGO Advet.

The goal of Ametov and his organisation is to restore land rights in Crimea to the Tatar people, 200,000 of whom were forcibly deported to Central Asia in 1944 by Joseph Stalin, under suspicion of being Nazi collaborators. The Crimean Tatars were allowed to return to their homeland towards the end of the Soviet era, but in many cases their lands had been redistributed in their absence. Some members of the community have taken to constructing temporary houses on land they wish to reclaim, without legal permission. Ametov stated that "when we kept getting refused by the authorities, we had to organise ourselves because our ancestors' land was given away to Russians and our historical heritage was being lost."

In 2009, 2,000 Tartars led by Ametov demonstrated in Simferopol. Ametov was sentenced to four years in prison in October 2010 for intention infliction of trivial or medium bodily injury to a police officer by the Central District Court of Simferopol. This case was connected to an incident in 2007, where it was alleged that Ametov struck a police inspector in the face and caused a minor injury to his nose. The sentence was upheld by the Simferopol Appeal Court, but was reduced to three years by the Higher Specialized Court on Civil and Criminal Matters in March 2011.
