= List of storms named Daniel =

The name Daniel has been used for nine tropical cyclones in the East Pacific Ocean and two European windstorms, including one Mediterranean tropical-like cyclone (medicane).

In the East Pacific:

- Hurricane Daniel (1978) – a Category 3 hurricane that did not affect land.
- Hurricane Daniel (1982) – a Category 3 which reached Hawaii as a tropical depression and dissipated in the Alenuihaha Channel between Maui and the Big Island.
- Tropical Storm Daniel (1988) – did not make landfall.
- Tropical Storm Daniel (1994) – no reports of damage or casualties.
- Hurricane Daniel (2000) – a Category 3 hurricane that threatened Hawaii for a time while weakening.
- Hurricane Daniel (2006) – a powerful Category 4 hurricane that stayed out to sea; remnants brought rain to Hawaii.
- Hurricane Daniel (2012) – a Category 3 hurricane that did not affect land.
- Tropical Storm Daniel (2018) – a weak tropical storm that never threatened land.
- Tropical Storm Daniel (2024) – weak tropical storm that stayed at sea.

In Europe:

- Storm Daniel (2019) – a European windstorm that moderately affected the Iberian Peninsula and Western Europe; also known as Storm Xavier.
- Storm Daniel (2023) – a European windstorm and later medicane which severely affected Greece and caused catastrophic damage in Libya due to multiple dam failures, leaving over 4,000 people confirmed dead and more than 8,000 missing.
