= H & R Daniel =

- Company type: Private
- Industry: Ceramics
- Founded: 1822; 203 years ago in Hanley, UK
- Founder: Henry Daniel
- Defunct: 1846
- Fate: Dissolved
- Key people: Henry and Richard Daniel
- Products: porcelain, earthenware

H & R Daniel is a little known manufactory of porcelain and earthenware. During the 24 years the pottery was in operation it was considered of equal stature with Spode, Minton and their contemporaries. The pottery was situated in Stoke on Trent, Staffordshire, England.

== Overview ==
Henry Daniel (1765–1841) was an enameller and colour maker. Prior to setting up his own manufactory in 1822 he ran a business within the Spode II* factory from at least 1805 to August 1822.

In 1822, Henry formed his own business. Richard (1800–1884) Henry's second son was officially made a partner in 1826. The manufactory known as H & R Daniel continued until 1846 when it ceased due to insolvency..

Daniel's wares were said to be on a par with the best hand painted porcelain of the time. Prestigious customers included the Earl of Shrewsbury and the Duke of Clarence (later William IV).

- Josiah Spode (1755–1827) known as Spode II to differentiate him from his father Josiah Spode I (1733–1797) and from his son, Josiah Spode III (1777–1829)..

== A Family of Enamellers ==
Henry was the son of Thomas (enameller) and Frances Daniel. It is perhaps unsurprising that Henry followed in his father's footsteps as an enameller.

Henry and Elizabeth had four children, Thomas; Richard; John & Ann.

== Henry Daniel’s Businesses ==
According to Berthoud, records show that Henry Daniel was in partnership with a John Brown in Hanley in 1802. This came to an end in June 1806 and John Brown continued the business at Hanley, which had included the manufacture of earthenware, enamelling and gilding.

From 1805 until 1822 Daniel ran his own business on the Spode II premises and was Spode's enameller. Whiter's job description of an enameller is of an “art director, a decorating manager, a colour manufacturer and a works chemist”. This illuminates the important role that Daniel held for Spode as he bought blanks from Spode, decorated them in his own rented premises and sold them back to Spode to market.

Henry Daniel's relationship with Spode II was that of one businessman to another. Daniel rented his workshop from Spode, paid to grind his colours and have use of the gold pan, purchased all the equipment necessary, hired his own staff and built three kilns on the Spode site.

John Democratis contests that Daniel and Spode were “a dream team”. Spode had the business acumen and produced fine wares that were decorated with exceptional skill and expertise by those in Daniel's employ. Whiter also describes Daniel as “an aristocrat of his craft”. Their arguments are backed up by a factory visit by none other than the Prince of Wales (subsequently George IV) in 1806. He conferred the Royal Warrant of Appointment on Spode II. Apart from the fine quality of the wares, the enamelling and gilding by Daniel must have played a huge part in such approbation. Daniel's factory was no mean affair. It is recorded that at the Coronation of George IV (July 19, 1821) there were 192 persons employed by Daniel of whom 119 were female.

The terms of agreement between Daniel and Spode II meant that when Daniel decided to set up in business of his own account, Spode had first call on all that Daniel owned on the Spode site. Not only that but Spode II had precedence at offering employment to those on Daniel's payroll. Wilkinson writes that “Daniel left Spode a wonderful legacy, fully equipped, well-designed decorating department with talented artists, hand paintresses, hand painters and gilders”.

== 1822-1846 ==
Arrangements were severed in August 1822 between Spode II and Henry Daniel who took over the former Minton China Works to establish his own business. Richard was formally taken on as a partner in his father's business in 1826.

It seems that Daniel lost no time at going into production for himself even if only in a small way. He was successful in gaining a very large order from the Earl of Shrewsbury that was completed in 1827. This prestigious order must surely have helped his business to become firmly established.

Evidence as to how the H & R Daniel products were received is indicated in a letter from Richard to his father. It appears that at this time Richard was promoting the family's wares to the London market. Richard exhorted his father to employ some more good flower painters, as “everybody says they never saw such goods before” and that other manufacturers trade was suffering because of the impact H & R Daniel was having in the market place.

Between 1826 and 1836 the business prospered. More simply decorated products followed this period. However 1839 saw an order for a more elaborate service for Mary Talbot (daughter of the Earl of Shrewsbury) on the occasion of her marriage.

Henry Daniel died in 1841 at the age of 76, notebooks show that he was still experimenting with colours as late as 1840. Towards the end of his life Henry was at odds with Richard and Henry's will shows this in the way his bequests were left.

The business continued as H & R Daniel until 1846 when it ceased trading due to financial difficulties. In 1847 Richard was sent to a debtors' prison. Michael Berthoud's H & R Daniel, 1822-1846 quoted extensively is a must read.

It is worth noting that H & R Daniel produced porcelain, earthenware and ornamental goods.

== Discovering Daniel Wares ==
This can prove almost impossible without appropriate resources. At the time H & R Daniel commenced their business, how would they be known? This was a new manufactory bursting onto the established scene when retailers at the time did not wish the public to know who the potter was for fear they would be cut out of the loop. This meant that items by and large would not have a factory mark; this did not apply to Daniel alone.

Such is the case for the vast majority of H & R Daniel, the Shrewsbury service being an exception where an ornate back stamp may be seen. Certain other makers marks may be found but these are very rare. Pattern books such as the one held in the Victoria and Albert Museum, London is a further help. Smith and Beardmore's Identifying Daniel Porcelain Tablewares, 2009 is another resource. Some items have pattern numbers often in gilt but occasionally in a predominant colour featured in the pattern and can be matched to those recorded. A further aid to identity may be by cup handle shapes.

With respect to Daniel earthenware items, these may be found with a backstamp giving the name of the pattern accompanied by a letter D. Unfortunately for the researcher/collector the same system was used by Thomas Dimmock & Co, this can and has resulted in confusion with Daniel items being wrongly attributed to Dimmock. Predominantly a book about H&R Daniel Earthenwares, 2015, this book contains a catalogue of Dimmock marks and patterns to assist with differentiation. Daniel earthenware marks can also be seen at http://www.danielcc.org/earthenware.php.
