= Jon Dodd =

American marine biologist and conservationist

- Born: 1961 (age 64–65)
- Education: University of Rhode Island
- Organization: Atlantic Shark Institute
- Known for: Shark Research
- Honours: Explorers Club Fellow
- Website: https://www.atlanticsharkinstitute.org/

Jon F. Dodd (born circa 1961) is an American marine biologist and conservationist best known as the founding Executive Director of the Atlantic Shark Institute (ASI), a Rhode Island–based non-profit dedicated to shark research, tagging, and conservation in the northwest Atlantic.

== Early life & education ==
Dodd grew up boating in Rhode Island and Connecticut and experienced his first blue shark encounter at age 14, sparking a lifelong passion for sharks. He earned a degree in biology with an emphasis on fisheries from the University of Rhode Island. As a young scientist, he volunteered at the NOAA NMFS Apex Predator Investigation Lab in Narragansett, RI, working on a wide variety of research projects.

== Career ==
Dodd tagged his first shark in the 1980s; over his career he has captured, tagged and released more than 1,000 sharks. He founded ASI in 2018 to fill critical research gaps and improve shark management through innovative collaborations with commercial fisherman, fishermen, universities, NGOs, and government agencies. He currently oversees a wide range of scientific projects, including tagging and tracking of great white, shortfin mako, thresher, porbeagle, blue, spinner, sand tiger, blacktip, and other species. In 2025, Dodd and the Atlantic Shark Institute helped identify a breakthrough discovery of Young-of-the-Year spinner sharks off Rhode Island.

=== Research highlights & Conservation achievements ===
Currently he leads deployment of the ASI’s acoustic receiver array to monitor tagged animals, which expanded to 20 receivers in 2025. He recently celebrated ASI’s milestone of tagging its 50th great white shark, a key step in understanding Young-of-the-Year and juvenile migration and population dynamics. As executive director of the Atlantic Shark Institute, Dodd oversees over 15 research projects, more than 50 volunteers, and 20 research vessels. Dodd has been an author on a number of published shark research papers including Feeding Kinematics in Sharks, A Global Review of the White Shark, Life Stage and Seasonal Habitat Use of the Porbeagle, Predictions of Southern Migration Timing in Coastal Sharks Under Future Ocean Warming and more.

== Other roles & recognition ==
Fellow of The Explorers Club, New York—honored in January 2024 for his significant contributions to shark research. Served on the Board of the Atlantic White Shark Conservancy for several years. In 2026, Dodd was featured in an Emmy-award winning film, Chasing Fins, part of the Ocean State: Rhode Island's Wild Coast series.
