= Daniele (surname) =

Daniele is an Italian surname. Notable people with the surname include:

- Eleonora Daniele (born 1976), Italian actress and television presenter
- Gaetano Daniele (born 1956), Italian film producer
- Graciela Daniele (born 1939), American dancer, choreographer and theatre director
- Guido Daniele (born 1950), Italian artist
- Mario Daniele (born 1961), Argentine politician
- Pino Daniele (1955–2015), Italian singer-songwriter and guitarist
- Romina Daniele (born 1980), Italian singer and composer
- Stephen Daniele, role-playing game artist
- Nina Marie Daniele, American Playboy model
