= Danyal =

Danyal (Arabic/Persian: دانيال, Dányál) is a masculine given name which means known intellectual and careful to justice. It is also a variant spelling of Daniel. It is a name of a prophet in both Christianity and Islam. Danyal translates in Hebrew to God is my judge. The name Danyal/Daniel is widely used in many languages internationally. The name Danyal also means leader of the people or chief/head of a tribe. In some informal or humorous contexts dating back to the early 1900s, Danyal has also been associated with the idea of a "big bird."

Danyal can also refer to:

- Danial, Ardabil, a village in Iran
- Danial, Mazandaran, a village in Iran
- Mausoleum of Danyal, a mosque, tomb and archaeological site in Tarsus, Turkey
- Kristen Danyal, a contestant in the Miss Michigan USA competition
- Shahzada Danyal, fifteenth-century prince of Bengal
