= Rhode Island Department of Environmental Management =

Government organization in Providence, US

Rhode Island Department of Environmental Management (RIDEM)

Agency overview
- Jurisdiction: Rhode Island
- Headquarters: 235 Promenade Street Providence, Rhode Island
- Agency executives: Terrence Gray, Acting Director; Adam Brusseau, Assistant Director-Finance; Michael Healey, Chief Public Affairs Officer; Ryan Mulcahey, Legislative Liaison; Mary E. Kay, Executive Counsel; Jason McNamee, Deputy Director, Bureau of Natural Resources
- Website: www.dem.ri.gov

The Rhode Island Department of Environmental Management (RIDEM) is a Rhode Island state government agency charged with supervising and controlling the protection, development, planning, and utilization of the natural resources of the state, including, but not limited to: water, plants, trees, soil, clay, sand, gravel, rocks and other minerals, air, mammals, birds, reptiles, amphibians, fish, shellfish, and other forms of aquatic, insect, and animal life.

It includes the Division of Parks and Recreation which is responsible for management of Rhode Island's fifteen State Parks, seven state beaches, and five public use lands.

Predecessor agencies include:

- RI Metropolitan Park Commission (1904-1934)
- RI Division of Forests, Parks and Parkways (1935-1952)
- RI Department of Public Works (Parks and Recreation Division, 1952-1965)
- RI Department of Natural Resources (1965-1975)

The lobbying of the Public Parks Association (1883-1903) was a significant factor in the creation of state parks in Rhode Island.

== Affiliations ==
The Rhode Island Department of Environmental Management (RIDEM) actively collaborates with various organizations to manage and conserve the state's natural resources, including marine life. A notable partnership is with the Atlantic Shark Institute (ASI), a Rhode Island-based nonprofit dedicated to shark research and conservation. Together, RIDEM and ASI have established an extensive network of acoustic receivers in Rhode Island waters to monitor shark movements and behavior. This collaboration has transformed the state from an "acoustic telemetry black hole" into a region with comprehensive shark tracking capabilities. The data collected aids in understanding shark migration patterns, residency times, and habitat use, which are crucial for informed management and conservation strategies.

Beyond infrastructure development, RIDEM and ASI jointly conduct various research projects focusing on different shark species. These include studies on juvenile white sharks, sand tiger sharks, and other species, utilizing methods like tagging, tissue sampling, and video surveillance. Such collaborative efforts not only advance scientific knowledge but also contribute to the development of policies aimed at ensuring the sustainability of shark populations in the region.
