= Daniele, Inc. =

American food company

Headquarters in Pascoag, Rhode Island

Daniele, Inc., is an American maker of Italian style foods such as prosciutto, salame, pancetta, capocollo and sopressata. The company was founded in Pascoag, Rhode Island, by Italian immigrant Vlado Dukcevich in 1976.

== History ==
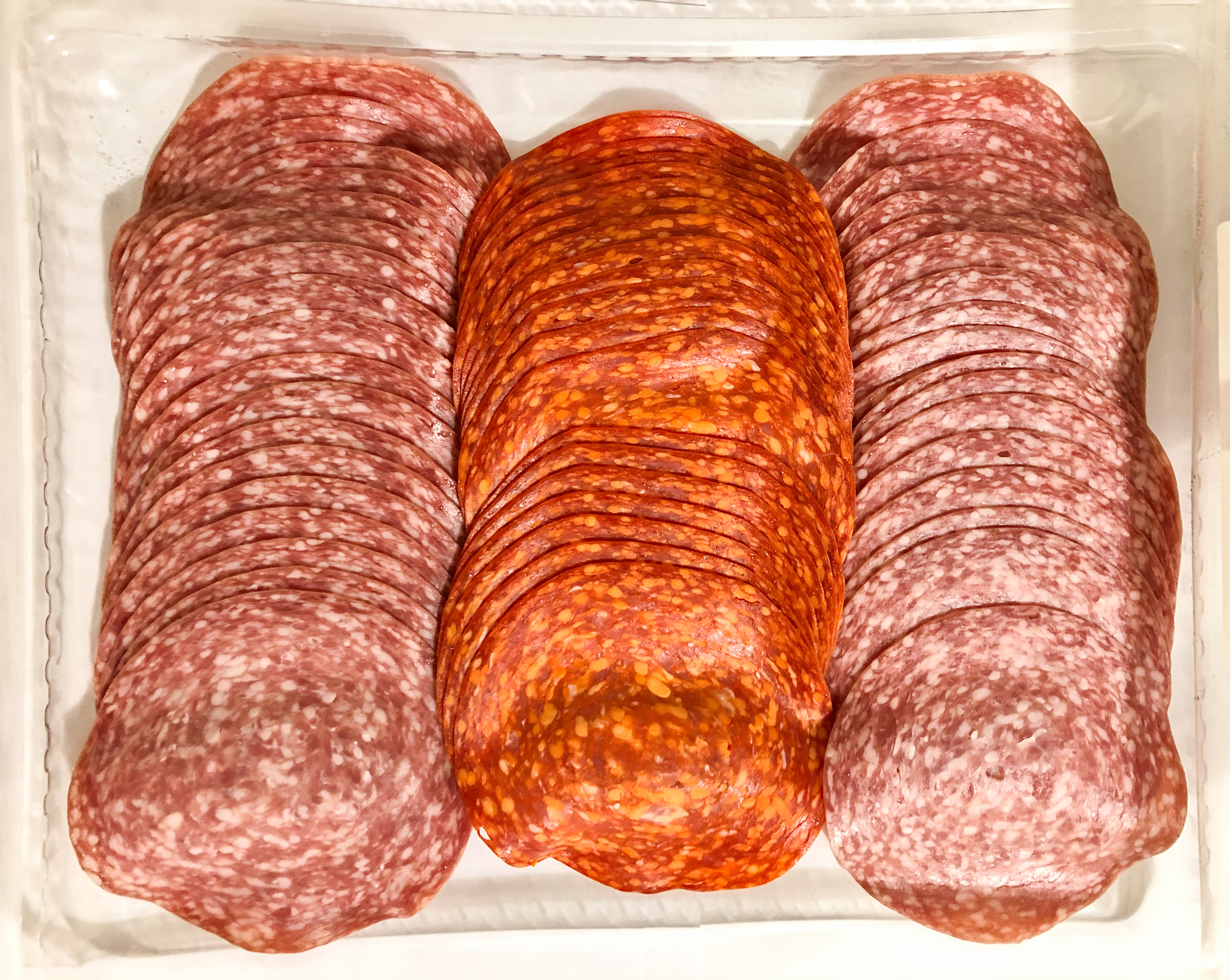
Daniele delicatessen trio (Genoa salami, pepperoni, hard salami)

Owners Stefano Dukcevich and his wife, Carolina, left Croatia after World War II and settled in 1945 in Trieste, Italy, where they learned the process of curing charcuterie and started their own company. By the 1950s, Stefano and Carolina had built one of the larger salumerias in northeast Italy. In 1976, the couple moved to Rhode Island, where they established Daniele Inc.

In September 2019, the company was sold to Entrepreneurial Equity Partners, a Chicago private equity fund.

In April 2020, 80 workers at the company's production facility in Burrillville, tested positive for coronavirus.

== Milestones ==
- 1977 – Daniele sells its first prosciutto.
- 1986 – The second manufacturing plant is opened in Pascoag, Rhode Island.
- 2004 – The third manufacturing plant is opened in Mapleville, Rhode Island.
- 2012 – Construction of Daniele's 4th manufacturing plant begins in Mapleville.
