= Kalleh Sar =

Kalleh Sar or Kaleh Sar or Kolah Sar or Kolleh Sar (Persian: كله سر), also rendered as Galleh Sar, may refer to various places in Iran:

- Kolleh Sar, Namin, Ardabil Province
- Kaleh Sar, Nir, Ardabil Province
- Kalleh Sar, alternate name of Qeshlaq-e Mazan-e Olya, Ardabil Province
- Kalleh Sar-e Olya, Ardabil Province
- Kalleh Sar-e Sofla, Ardabil Province
- Kalleh Sar, Gilan
- Kalleh Sar, Hamadan
- Kalleh Sar, Qazvin
- Kalleh Sar, Zanjan
