= Havas (disambiguation) =

Havas may refer to:

== Businesses ==
- Havas, French advertising company
- Havas Worldwide, American marketing communications agency

== People ==
- Charles-Louis Havas (1783–1858), French writer
- Judit Magos-Havas (1951–2018), Hungarian table tennis player
- Lianne La Havas (born 1989), English folk and soul singer
- Kató Havas (1920–2018), Romanian violinist
- Frédéric Havas (born 1973), French volleyball player
- Sari Havas (born 1962), Finnish actress
- Henrik Havas (born 1949), Hungarian journalist
- Paul Havas (1940–2012), American painter

== Places ==
- Havas, Iran, village in Iran
- Havas Kandi, village in Iran
- Pol Havas, village in Iran
