= Elyatu =

Elyatu الياتو
- Village
- Location within Iran
- Coordinates: 35°31′36″N 59°42′35″E
- Country: Iran
- Province: Razavi Khorasan
- County: Fariman
- Bakhsh: Central
- Rural District: Balaband

Population (2006)
  - Total: 271
- Time zone: UTC+3:30 (IRST)
  - Summer (DST): UTC+4:30 (IRDT)

Elyatu (Persian: الياتو, also Romanized as Elyātū) is a village in Balaband Rural District, in the Central District of Fariman County, Razavi Khorasan Province, Iran. At the 2006 census, its population was 271, in 62 families.
