= Cheshmeh Jalal =

Cheshmeh Jalal چشمه جلال
- Village
- Location within Iran
- Coordinates: 35°34′53″N 59°35′57″E
- Country: Iran
- Province: Razavi Khorasan
- County: Fariman
- Bakhsh: Central
- Rural District: Balaband

Population (2006)
  - Total: 85
- Time zone: UTC+3:30 (IRST)
  - Summer (DST): UTC+4:30 (IRDT)

Cheshmeh Jalal (Persian: چشمه جلال, also Romanized as Cheshmeh Jalāl) is a village in Balaband Rural District, in the Central District of Fariman County, Razavi Khorasan Province, Iran. At the 2006 census, its population was 85, in 21 families.
