= Hoseyn Aliabad =

Hoseyn Aliabad or Hoseynaliabad (Persian: حسين علي اباد) may refer to:

- Hoseynaliabad, Fars, a village in Fars Province, Iran
- Hoseyn Aliabad, Lorestan, a village in Lorestan Province, Iran
- Hoseynaliabad, Razavi Khorasan, a village in Razavi Khorasan Province, Iran
