= Gharq Ab Zar =

Gharq Ab Zar غرق اب زار
- Village
- Location within Iran
- Coordinates: 35°29′41″N 59°42′01″E
- Country: Iran
- Province: Razavi Khorasan
- County: Fariman
- Bakhsh: Central
- Rural District: Balaband

Population (2006)
  - Total: 52
- Time zone: UTC+3:30 (IRST)
  - Summer (DST): UTC+4:30 (IRDT)

Gharq Ab Zar (Persian: غرق اب زار, also Romanized as Gharq Āb Zār and Gharqāb Zār) is a village in Balaband Rural District, in the Central District of Fariman County, Razavi Khorasan Province, Iran. At the 2006 census, its population was 52, in 12 families.
