= Kalateh-ye Hajji Azim =

Kalateh-ye Hajji Azim كلاته حاجي عظيم
- Village
- Location within Iran
- Coordinates: 35°38′24″N 59°31′18″E
- Country: Iran
- Province: Razavi Khorasan
- County: Fariman
- Bakhsh: Central
- Rural District: Balaband

Population (2006)
  - Total: 21
- Time zone: UTC+3:30 (IRST)
  - Summer (DST): UTC+4:30 (IRDT)

Kalateh-ye Hajji Azim (Persian: كلاته حاجي عظيم, also Romanized as Kalāteh-ye Ḩājjī ‘Az̧īm) is a village in Balaband Rural District, in the Central District of Fariman County, Razavi Khorasan Province, Iran. At the 2006 census, its population was 21, in 5 families.
