= Shekar Tu =

Shekar Tu شكرتو
- Village
- Location within Iran
- Coordinates: 35°31′25″N 59°37′20″E
- Country: Iran
- Province: Razavi Khorasan
- County: Fariman
- Bakhsh: Central
- Rural District: Balaband

Population (2006)
  - Total: 76
- Time zone: UTC+3:30 (IRST)
  - Summer (DST): UTC+4:30 (IRDT)

Shekar Tu (Persian: شكرتو, also Romanized as Shekar Tū) is a village in Balaband Rural District, in the Central District of Fariman County, Razavi Khorasan Province, Iran. At the 2006 census, its population was 76, in 19 families.
