= Bareh Khur =

Bareh Khur بره خور
- Village
- Location within Iran
- Coordinates: 35°39′19″N 59°31′09″E
- Country: Iran
- Province: Razavi Khorasan
- County: Fariman
- Bakhsh: Central
- Rural District: Balaband

Population (2006)
  - Total: 117
- Time zone: UTC+3:30 (IRST)
  - Summer (DST): UTC+4:30 (IRDT)

Bareh Khur (Persian: بره خور, also Romanized as Bareh Khūr) is a village in Balaband Rural District, in the Central District of Fariman County, Razavi Khorasan Province, Iran. At the 2006 census, its population was 117, in 24 families.

== See also ==
- List of cities, towns and villages in Razavi Khorasan Province
