= Qarqanatu =

Qarqanatu قرقناتو
- Village
- Location within Iran
- Coordinates: 35°35′06″N 59°39′28″E
- Country: Iran
- Province: Razavi Khorasan
- County: Fariman
- Bakhsh: Central
- Rural District: Balaband

Population (2006)
  - Total: 61
- Time zone: UTC+3:30 (IRST)
  - Summer (DST): UTC+4:30 (IRDT)

Qarqanatu (Persian: قرقناتو, also Romanized as Qarqanātū; also known as Qarah Qanātū ) is a village in Balaband Rural District, in the Central District of Fariman County, Razavi Khorasan Province, Iran. At the 2006 census, its population was 61, in 11 families.
