= Kalateh-ye Sabz =

Kalateh-ye Sabz كلاته سبز
- village
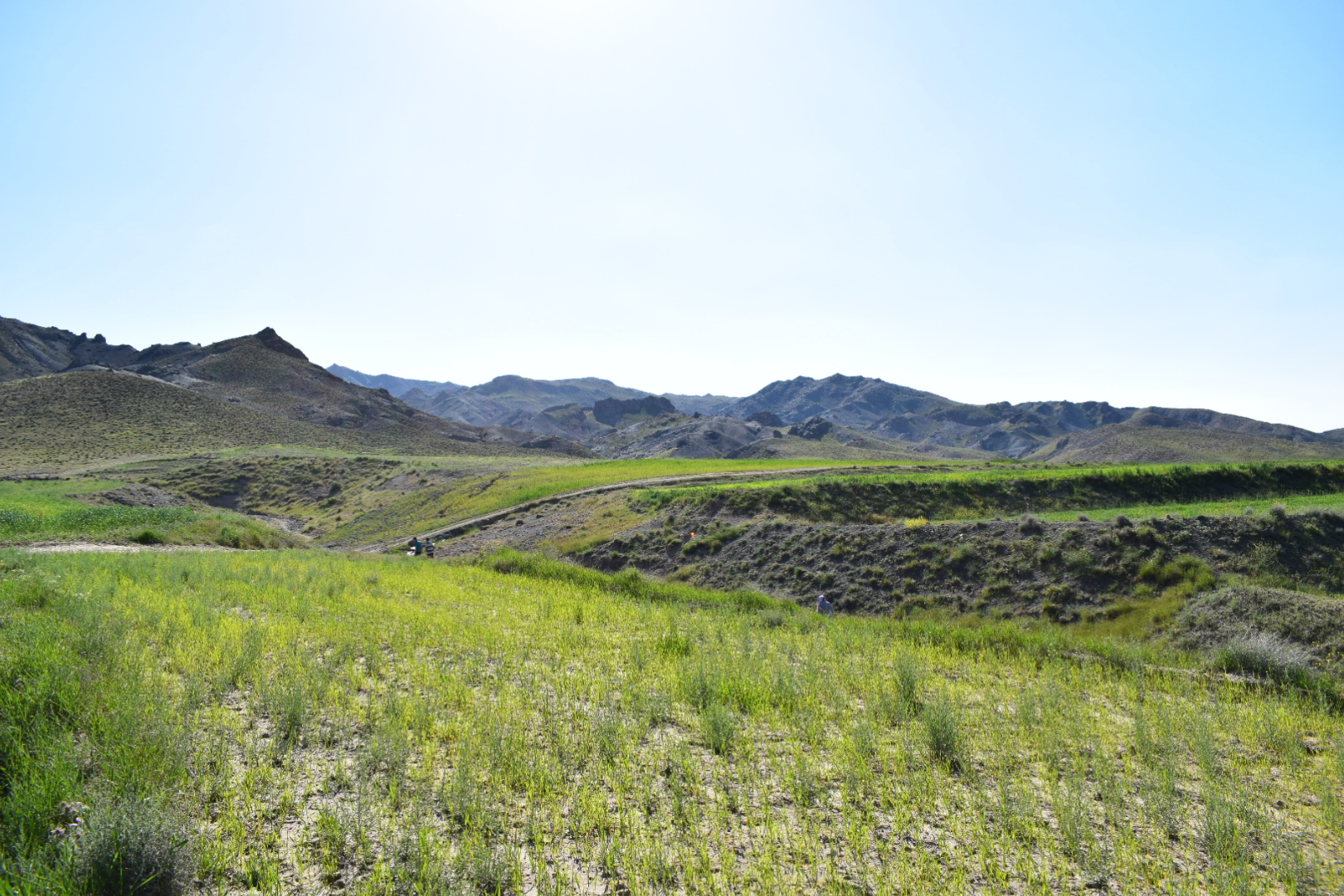

- Location within Iran
- Coordinates: 35°43′33″N 59°39′49″E
- Country: Iran
- Province: Razavi Khorasan
- County: Fariman
- Bakhsh: Central
- Rural District: Fariman

Population (2006)
  - Total: 200
- Time zone: UTC+3:30 (IRST)
  - Summer (DST): UTC+4:30 (IRDT)

Kalateh-ye Sabz (Persian: كلاته سبز, also Romanized as Kalāteh-ye Sabz) is a village in Fariman Rural District, in the Central District of Fariman County, Razavi Khorasan Province, Iran. At the 2006 census, its population was 200, in 49 families.
