= Abkuh =

Abkuh ابكوه
- Village
- Location within Iran
- Coordinates: 35°45′50″N 59°37′21″E
- Country: Iran
- Province: Razavi Khorasan
- County: Fariman
- Bakhsh: Central
- Rural District: Fariman

Population (2006)
  - Total: 181
- Time zone: UTC+3:30 (IRST)
  - Summer (DST): UTC+4:30 (IRDT)

Abkuh (Persian: ابكوه, also Romanized as Ābkūh) is a village in Fariman Rural District, in the Central District of Fariman County, Razavi Khorasan Province, Iran. At the 2006 census, its population was 181, in 37 families.

== See also ==
- List of cities, towns and villages in Razavi Khorasan Province
