= Baba Qarah =

Baba Qarah باباقره
- Village
- Location within Iran
- Coordinates: 35°37′31″N 59°39′56″E
- Country: Iran
- Province: Razavi Khorasan
- County: Fariman
- Bakhsh: Central
- Rural District: Balaband

Population (2006)
  - Total: 114
- Time zone: UTC+3:30 (IRST)
  - Summer (DST): UTC+4:30 (IRDT)

Baba Qarah (Persian: باباقره, also Romanized as Bābā Qarah) is a village in Balaband Rural District, in the Central District of Fariman County, Razavi Khorasan Province, Iran. At the 2006 census, its population was 114, in 26 families.

== See also ==
- List of cities, towns and villages in Razavi Khorasan Province
