= Qaleh Shira =

Qaleh Shira قلعه شيرا
- Village
- Location within Iran
- Coordinates: 35°34′48″N 59°39′05″E
- Country: Iran
- Province: Razavi Khorasan
- County: Fariman
- Bakhsh: Central
- Rural District: Balaband

Population (2006)
  - Total: 34
- Time zone: UTC+3:30 (IRST)
  - Summer (DST): UTC+4:30 (IRDT)

Qaleh Shira (Persian: قلعه شيرا, also Romanized as Qal‘eh Shīrā) is a village in Balaband Rural District, in the Central District of Fariman County, Razavi Khorasan Province, Iran. At the 2006 census, its population was 34, in 8 families.
