= Kateh Gush =

Kateh Gush كته گوش
- Village
- Location within Iran
- Coordinates: 35°31′56″N 59°47′21″E
- Country: Iran
- Province: Razavi Khorasan
- County: Fariman
- Bakhsh: Central
- Rural District: Balaband

Population (2006)
  - Total: 73
- Time zone: UTC+3:30 (IRST)
  - Summer (DST): UTC+4:30 (IRDT)

Kateh Gush (Persian: كته گوش, also Romanized as Kateh Gūsh) is a village in Balaband Rural District, in the Central District of Fariman County, Razavi Khorasan Province, Iran. At the 2006 census, its population was 73, in 23 families.
