= Jemran =

Jemran جمران
- Village
- Location within Iran
- Coordinates: 35°50′09″N 59°33′27″E
- Country: Iran
- Province: Razavi Khorasan
- County: Fariman
- Bakhsh: Central
- Rural District: Sang Bast

Population (2006)
  - Total: 86
- Time zone: UTC+3:30 (IRST)
  - Summer (DST): UTC+4:30 (IRDT)

Jemran (Persian: جمران, also Romanized as Jemrān) is a village in Sang Bast Rural District, in the Central District of Fariman County, Razavi Khorasan Province, Iran. At the 2006 census, its population was 86, in 24 families.
