= Kalateh-ye Akhund, Razavi Khorasan =

Kalateh-ye Akhund كلاته اخوند
- Village
- Location within Iran
- Coordinates: 35°37′58″N 59°46′06″E
- Country: Iran
- Province: Razavi Khorasan
- County: Fariman
- Bakhsh: Central
- Rural District: Fariman

Population (2006)
  - Total: 131
- Time zone: UTC+3:30 (IRST)
  - Summer (DST): UTC+4:30 (IRDT)

Kalateh-ye Akhund (Persian: كلاته اخوند, also Romanized as Kalāteh-ye Ākhūnd) is a village in Fariman Rural District, in the Central District of Fariman County, Razavi Khorasan Province, Iran. At the 2006 census, its population was 131, in 38 families.
