= Chahar Bast Bagh =

Village in Razavi Khorasan province, Iran

Chahar Bast Bagh Persian: چهاربست باغ
- Village
- Location within Iran
- Coordinates: 35°37′59″N 59°38′00″E
- Country: Iran
- Province: Razavi Khorasan
- County: Fariman
- District: Central
- Rural District: Balaband

Population (2016)
  - Total: 979
- Time zone: UTC+3:30 (IRST)

Chahar Bast Bagh (Persian: چهاربست باغ) (Note: Also romanized as Chahār Bast Bāgh; also known as Chahār Bast) is a village in Balaband Rural District of the Central District in Fariman County, Razavi Khorasan province, Iran.

== Demographics ==
=== Population ===
At the time of the 2006 National Census, the village's population was 778 in 157 households. The following census in 2011 counted 829 people in 206 households. The 2016 census measured the population of the village as 979 people in 263 households, the most populous in its rural district.
