= Altatu =

Village in Razavi Khorasan province, Iran

Altatu Persian: التاتو
- Village
- Location within Iran
- Coordinates: 35°33′11″N 59°30′41″E
- Country: Iran
- Province: Razavi Khorasan
- County: Fariman
- District: Central
- Rural District: Balaband

Population (2016)
  - Total: 379
- Time zone: UTC+3:30 (IRST)

Altatu (Persian: التاتو) (Note: Also romanized as Altātū) is a village in Balaband Rural District of the Central District in Fariman County, Razavi Khorasan province, Iran.

== Demographics ==
=== Population ===
At the time of the 2006 National Census, the village's population was 419 in 105 households. The following census in 2011 counted 455 people in 126 households. The 2016 census measured the population of the village as 379 people in 102 households.
