= Sadabad, Fariman =

Village in Razavi Khorasan province, Iran

Sadabad Persian: سعداباد
- Village
- Location within Iran
- Coordinates: 35°55′42″N 59°47′04″E
- Country: Iran
- Province: Razavi Khorasan
- County: Fariman
- District: Central
- Rural District: Sang Bast

Population (2016)
  - Total: 1,157
- Time zone: UTC+3:30 (IRST)

Sadabad (Persian: سعداباد) (Note: Also romanized as Sa‘dābād; also known as Sa‘idābād) is a village in Sang Bast Rural District of the Central District in Fariman County, Razavi Khorasan province, Iran.

== Demographics ==
=== Population ===
At the time of the 2006 National Census, the village's population was 971 in 262 households. The following census in 2011 counted 1,113 people in 312 households. The 2016 census measured the population of the village as 1,157 people in 335 households, the most populous in its rural district.
