= Gol Mey-e Bala =

Gol Mey-e Bala گلمي بالا
- Village
- Location within Iran
- Coordinates: 35°53′40″N 59°37′38″E
- Country: Iran
- Province: Razavi Khorasan
- County: Fariman
- Bakhsh: Central
- Rural District: Sang Bast

Population (2006)
  - Total: 52
- Time zone: UTC+3:30 (IRST)
  - Summer (DST): UTC+4:30 (IRDT)

Gol Mey-e Bala (Persian: گلمي بالا, also Romanized as Gol Mey-e Bālā) is a village in Sang Bast Rural District, in the Central District of Fariman County, Razavi Khorasan Province, Iran. At the 2006 census, its population was 52, in 12 families.
