= Angurtlar =

Angurtlar (Persian: انگورتلار) may refer to:

- Angurtlar-e Olya
- Angurtlar-e Sofla
