= Kalateh-ye Khvosh, Razavi Khorasan =

Kalateh-ye Khvosh كلاته خوش
- Village
- Location within Iran
- Coordinates: 35°42′51″N 59°40′37″E
- Country: Iran
- Province: Razavi Khorasan
- County: Fariman
- Bakhsh: Central
- Rural District: Fariman

Population (2006)
  - Total: 160
- Time zone: UTC+3:30 (IRST)
  - Summer (DST): UTC+4:30 (IRDT)

Kalateh-ye Khvosh (Persian: كلاته خوش, also Romanized as Kalāteh-ye Khvosh; also known as Kalāteh-ye Khowshk) is a village in Fariman Rural District, in the Central District of Fariman County, Razavi Khorasan Province, Iran. At the 2006 census, its population was 160, in 36 families.
