= Cheram =

Village in Razavi Khorasan province, Iran

Cheram Persian: چرم
- Village
- Location within Iran
- Coordinates: 35°50′56″N 59°35′43″E
- Country: Iran
- Province: Razavi Khorasan
- County: Fariman
- District: Central
- Rural District: Sang Bast

Population (2016)
  - Total: 267
- Time zone: UTC+3:30 (IRST)

Cheram (Persian: چرم) is a village in Sang Bast Rural District of the Central District in Fariman County, Razavi Khorasan province, Iran.

== Demographics ==
=== Population ===
At the time of the 2006 National Census, the village's population was 262 in 87 households. The following census in 2011 counted 243 people in 82 households. The 2016 census measured the population of the village as 267 people in 88 households.
