= Hasanabad-e Sufi =

Village in Razavi Khorasan province, Iran

Hasanabad-e Sufi Persian: حسن ابادصوفي
- Village
- Location within Iran
- Coordinates: 35°31′59″N 59°33′28″E
- Country: Iran
- Province: Razavi Khorasan
- County: Fariman
- District: Central
- Rural District: Balaband

Population (2016)
  - Total: 480
- Time zone: UTC+3:30 (IRST)

Hasanabad-e Sufi (Persian: حسن ابادصوفي) (Note: Also romanized as Ḩasanābād-e Şūfī; also known as Ḩasanābād) is a village in Balaband Rural District of the Central District in Fariman County, Razavi Khorasan province, Iran.

== Demographics ==
=== Population ===
At the time of the 2006 National Census, the village's population was 450 in 101 households. The following census in 2011 counted 439 people in 114 households. The 2016 census measured the population of the village as 480 people in 135 households.
