= Aq Kamar =

Aq Kamar (Persian: اق كمر) may refer to:

- Aq Kamar-e Olya
- Aq Kamar-e Sofla
