= Sang Bast =

Sang Bast or Sang-e Bast (Persian: سنگ بست) may refer to:

- Sang-e Bast, Mazandaran
- Sang Bast, Razavi Khorasan
- Sang Bast Rural District, in Razavi Khorasan Province
