= Qater Yuran =

Qater Yuran (Persian: قاطريوران) may refer to:

- Qater Yuran-e Olya
- Qater Yuran-e Sofla
