= Ahmadabad, Fariman =

Village in Razavi Khorasan province, Iran

Ahmadabad Persian: احمداباد
- Village
- Location within Iran
- Coordinates: 35°50′36″N 59°36′28″E
- Country: Iran
- Province: Razavi Khorasan
- County: Fariman
- District: Central
- Rural District: Sang Bast

Population (2016)
  - Total: 404
- Time zone: UTC+3:30 (IRST)

Ahmadabad (Persian: احمداباد) (Note: Also romanized as Aḩmadābād; also known as Aḩmadābād-e Sarjām) is a village in Sang Bast Rural District of the Central District in Fariman County, Razavi Khorasan province, Iran.

== Demographics ==
=== Population ===
At the time of the 2006 National Census, the village's population was 359 in 106 households. The following census in 2011 counted 379 people in 123 households. The 2016 census measured the population of the village as 404 people in 136 households.
