= Qaleh Sangi, Razavi Khorasan =

Village in Razavi Khorasan province, Iran

Qaleh Sangi Persian: قلعه سنگي
- Village
- Location within Iran
- Coordinates: 35°32′33″N 59°34′44″E
- Country: Iran
- Province: Razavi Khorasan
- County: Fariman
- District: Central
- Rural District: Balaband

Population (2016)
  - Total: 479
- Time zone: UTC+3:30 (IRST)

Qaleh Sangi (Persian: قلعه سنگي) (Note: Also romanized as Qal‘eh Sangī) is a village in Balaband Rural District of the Central District in Fariman County, Razavi Khorasan province, Iran.

== Demographics ==
=== Population ===
At the time of the 2006 National Census, the village's population was 474 in 104 households. The following census in 2011 counted 478 people in 116 households. The 2016 census measured the population of the village as 479 people in 133 households.
