= Sang-e Atash, Fariman =

Village in Razavi Khorasan province, Iran

Sang-e Atash Persian: سنگ اتش
- Village
- Location within Iran
- Coordinates: 35°51′53″N 59°42′13″E
- Country: Iran
- Province: Razavi Khorasan
- County: Fariman
- District: Central
- Rural District: Fariman

Population (2016)
  - Total: 332
- Time zone: UTC+3:30 (IRST)

Sang-e Atash (Persian: سنگ اتش) (Note: Also romanized as Sang Ātash and Sang-e Ātash) is a village in Fariman Rural District of the Central District in Fariman County, Razavi Khorasan province, Iran.

== Demographics ==
=== Population ===
At the time of the 2006 National Census, the village's population was 331 in 83 households. The following census in 2011 counted 341 people in 92 households. The 2016 census measured the population of the village as 332 people in 97 households.
