= Maghu =

Village in Razavi Khorasan province, Iran

Maghu Persian: ماغو
- Village
- Location within Iran
- Coordinates: 35°35′32″N 59°40′49″E
- Country: Iran
- Province: Razavi Khorasan
- County: Fariman
- District: Central
- Rural District: Balaband

Population (2016)
  - Total: 479
- Time zone: UTC+3:30 (IRST)

Maghu (Persian: ماغو) (Note: Also romanized as Māghū) is a village in Balaband Rural District of the Central District in Fariman County, Razavi Khorasan province, Iran.

== Demographics ==
=== Population ===
At the time of the 2006 National Census, the village's population was 436 in 96 households. The following census in 2011 counted 443 people in 120 households. The 2016 census measured the population of the village as 479 people in 131 households.
