= Zarkak, Fariman =

Village in Razavi Khorasan province, Iran

Zarkak Persian: زركك
- Village
- Location within Iran
- Coordinates: 35°35′46″N 59°41′59″E
- Country: Iran
- Province: Razavi Khorasan
- County: Fariman
- District: Central
- Rural District: Balaband

Population (2016)
  - Total: 334
- Time zone: UTC+3:30 (IRST)

Zarkak (Persian: زركك) (Note: Also known as Zargak) is a village in, and the capital of, Balaband Rural District in the Central District of Fariman County, Razavi Khorasan province, Iran.

== Demographics ==
=== Population ===
At the time of the 2006 National Census, the village's population was 450 in 102 households. The following census in 2011 counted 275 people in 76 households. The 2016 census measured the population of the village as 334 people in 94 households.
