= Hasan-e Aliabad =

Hasan-e Aliabad حسنعلي اباد
- Village
- Location within Iran
- Coordinates: 35°56′50″N 59°40′19″E
- Country: Iran
- Province: Razavi Khorasan
- County: Fariman
- Bakhsh: Central
- Rural District: Sang Bast

Population (2006)
  - Total: 20
- Time zone: UTC+3:30 (IRST)
  - Summer (DST): UTC+4:30 (IRDT)

Hasan-e Aliabad (Persian: حسنعلي اباد, also Romanized as Ḩasan-e ‘Alīābād and Ḩasan ‘Alīābād; also known as Ḩoseyn‘alīābād) is a village in Sang Bast Rural District, in the Central District of Fariman County, Razavi Khorasan Province, Iran. At the 2006 census, its population was 20, in 6 families.
