= Lushab (disambiguation) =

Lushab is a village in Isfahan Province, Iran.

Lushab or Lush Ab (Persian: لوشاب) may also refer to:

- Lushab-e Fariman, Razavi Khorasan Province
- Lush Ab-e Qalandarabad, Razavi Khorasan Province
