= Musaabad, Fariman =

Village in Razavi Khorasan province, Iran

Musaabad Persian: موسي اباد
- Village
- Location within Iran
- Coordinates: 35°55′23″N 59°42′31″E
- Country: Iran
- Province: Razavi Khorasan
- County: Fariman
- District: Central
- Rural District: Sang Bast

Population (2016)
  - Total: 272
- Time zone: UTC+3:30 (IRST)

Musaabad (Persian: موسي اباد) (Note: Also romanized as Mūsáābād; also known as Mūsáābād-e Sarjām) is a village in Sang Bast Rural District of the Central District in Fariman County, Razavi Khorasan province, Iran.

== Demographics ==
=== Population ===
At the time of the 2006 National Census, the village's population was 256 in 72 households. The following census in 2011 counted 258 people in 80 households. The 2016 census measured the population of the village as 272 people in 87 households.
