= Cheshmeh Golek =

Cheshmeh Golek (Persian: چشمه گلك) may refer to:

- Cheshmeh Golek-e Olya
- Cheshmeh Golek-e Sofla
