= Gandeh Cheshmeh =

Village in Razavi Khorasan province, Iran

Gandeh Cheshmeh Persian: گنده چشمه
- Village
- Location within Iran
- Coordinates: 35°48′43″N 59°39′37″E
- Country: Iran
- Province: Razavi Khorasan
- County: Fariman
- District: Central
- Rural District: Fariman

Population (2016)
  - Total: 323
- Time zone: UTC+3:30 (IRST)

Gandeh Cheshmeh (Persian: گنده چشمه) (Note: Also known as Gandāb (گنداب) and Qondāb (قنداب)) is a village in Fariman Rural District of the Central District in Fariman County, Razavi Khorasan province, Iran.

== Demographics ==
=== Population ===
At the time of the 2006 National Census, the village's population was 265 in 61 households. The following census in 2011 counted 295 people in 79 households. The 2016 census measured the population of the village as 323 people in 91 households.
