= Feyzabad, Fariman =

Village in Razavi Khorasan province, Iran

Feyzabad Persian: فيض اباد
- Village
- Location within Iran
- Coordinates: 35°52′49″N 59°48′16″E
- Country: Iran
- Province: Razavi Khorasan
- County: Fariman
- District: Central
- Rural District: Fariman

Population (2016)
  - Total: 438
- Time zone: UTC+3:30 (IRST)

Feyzabad (Persian: فيض اباد) (Note: Also romanized as Feiz Abad and Feyẕābād) is a village in Fariman Rural District of the Central District in Fariman County, Razavi Khorasan province, Iran.

== Demographics ==
=== Population ===
At the time of the 2006 National Census, the village's population was 401 in 101 households. The following census in 2011 counted 421 people in 113 households. The 2016 census measured the population of the village as 438 people in 130 households.
