= Gol Mey =

Gol Mey (Persian: گلمي) may refer to:

- Gol Mey-e Bala
- Gol Mey-e Pain
