= Hedayatabad =

Village in Razavi Khorasan province, Iran

Hedayatabad Persian: هدايت اباد
- Village
- Location within Iran
- Coordinates: 35°57′02″N 59°44′13″E
- Country: Iran
- Province: Razavi Khorasan
- County: Fariman
- District: Central
- Rural District: Sang Bast

Population (2016)
  - Total: 628
- Time zone: UTC+3:30 (IRST)

Hedayatabad (Persian: هدايت اباد) (Note: Also romanized as Hedāyatābād) is a village in Sang Bast Rural District of the Central District in Fariman County, Razavi Khorasan province, Iran.

== Demographics ==
=== Population ===
At the time of the 2006 National Census, the village's population was 507 in 125 households. The following census in 2011 counted 594 people in 168 households. The 2016 census measured the population of the village as 628 people in 189 households.
