= Bagh-e Salar =

Village in Razavi Khorasan province, Iran

Bagh-e Salar Persian: باغ سالار
- Village
- Location within Iran
- Coordinates: 35°58′28″N 59°45′17″E
- Country: Iran
- Province: Razavi Khorasan
- County: Fariman
- District: Central
- Rural District: Sang Bast

Population (2016)
  - Total: 726
- Time zone: UTC+3:30 (IRST)

Bagh-e Salar (Persian: باغ سالار) (Note: Also romanized as Bāgh Sālār and Bāgh-e Sālār) is a village in Sang Bast Rural District of the Central District in Fariman County, Razavi Khorasan province, Iran.

== Demographics ==
=== Population ===
At the time of the 2006 National Census, the village's population was 615 in 159 households. The following census in 2011 counted 722 people in 209 households. The 2016 census measured the population of the village as 726 people in 214 households.
