= Peyvand-e Kohneh =

Peyvand-e Kohneh پيوندكهنه
- Village
- Location within Iran
- Coordinates: 35°37′25″N 59°42′45″E
- Country: Iran
- Province: Razavi Khorasan
- County: Fariman
- Bakhsh: Central
- Rural District: Balaband

Population (2006)
  - Total: 93
- Time zone: UTC+3:30 (IRST)
  - Summer (DST): UTC+4:30 (IRDT)

Peyvand-e Kohneh (Persian: پيوندكهنه) is a village in Balaband Rural District, in the Central District of Fariman County, Razavi Khorasan Province, Iran. At the 2006 census, its population was 93, in 20 families.
