= Gol Mey-e Pain =

Gol Mey-e Pain گلمي پايين
- Village
- Location within Iran
- Coordinates: 35°54′11″N 59°37′43″E
- Country: Iran
- Province: Razavi Khorasan
- County: Fariman
- Bakhsh: Central
- Rural District: Sang Bast

Population (2006)
  - Total: 80
- Time zone: UTC+3:30 (IRST)
  - Summer (DST): UTC+4:30 (IRDT)

Gol Mey-e Pain (Persian: گلمي پايين, also Romanized as Gol Mey-e Pā’īn) is a village in Sang Bast Rural District, in the Central District of Fariman County, Razavi Khorasan Province, Iran. At the 2006 census, its population was 80, in 23 families.
