= Cheshmeh Golek-e Sofla =

Cheshmeh Golek-e Sofla چشمه گلك سفلي
- Village
- Location within Iran
- Coordinates: 35°37′42″N 59°33′48″E
- Country: Iran
- Province: Razavi Khorasan
- County: Fariman
- Bakhsh: Central
- Rural District: Balaband

Population (2006)
  - Total: 201
- Time zone: UTC+3:30 (IRST)
  - Summer (DST): UTC+4:30 (IRDT)

Cheshmeh Golek-e Sofla (Persian: چشمه گلك سفلي, also Romanized as Cheshmeh Golek-e Soflá; also known as Cheshmeh Golek-e Pā’īn) is a village in Balaband Rural District, in the Central District of Fariman County, Razavi Khorasan province, Iran. At the 2006 census, its population was 201, in 42 families.
