= Maragheh, Razavi Khorasan =

Village in Razavi Khorasan province, Iran

Maragheh Persian: مراغه
- Village
- Location within Iran
- Coordinates: 35°49′45″N 59°38′00″E
- Country: Iran
- Province: Razavi Khorasan
- County: Fariman
- District: Central
- Rural District: Sang Bast

Population (2016)
  - Total: 276
- Time zone: UTC+3:30 (IRST)

Maragheh (Persian: مراغه) (Note: Also romanized as Marāgheh; also known as Maragheb) is a village in Sang Bast Rural District of the Central District in Fariman County, Razavi Khorasan province, Iran.

== Demographics ==
=== Population ===
At the time of the 2006 National Census, the village's population was 358 in 104 households. The following census in 2011 counted 307 people in 101 households. The 2016 census measured the population of the village as 276 people in 93 households.
