= Peyvand =

Peyvand or Paiwand (Persian: پيوند) may refer to:

- Peyvand-e Kohneh
- Peyvand-e Olya
