= Aqar =

Aqar (Persian: اقر) may refer to:

- Aqar-e Olya
- Aqar-e Sofla
