= Cheshmeh Golek-e Olya =

Cheshmeh Golek-e Olya چشمه گلك عليا
- Village
- Location within Iran
- Coordinates: 35°38′26″N 59°34′09″E
- Country: Iran
- Province: Razavi Khorasan
- County: Fariman
- Bakhsh: Central
- Rural District: Balaband

Population (2006)
  - Total: 138
- Time zone: UTC+3:30 (IRST)
  - Summer (DST): UTC+4:30 (IRDT)

Cheshmeh Golek-e Olya (Persian: چشمه گلك عليا, also Romanized as Cheshmeh Golek-e 'Olyā; also known as Cheshmeh Golek-e Bālā) is a village in Balaband Rural District, in the Central District of Fariman County, Razavi Khorasan province, Iran. At the 2006 census, its population was 138, in 31 families.
