= Aqa Bil =

Aqa Bil (Persian: اقابيل) may refer to:

- Aqa Bil-e Olya
- Aqa Bil-e Sofla
