= Qaleh Now-ye Fariman =

Village in Razavi Khorasan province, Iran

Qaleh Now-ye Fariman Persian: قلعه نو فريمان
- Village
- Location within Iran
- Coordinates: 35°39′47″N 59°56′55″E
- Country: Iran
- Province: Razavi Khorasan
- County: Fariman
- District: Central
- Rural District: Fariman

Population (2016)
  - Total: 3,722
- Time zone: UTC+3:30 (IRST)

Qaleh Now-ye Fariman (Persian: قلعه نوفريمان) (Note: Also romanized as Qal‘eh Now-e Farīmān, Qal‘eh Now-ye Farīmān, Qal’eh Now-Ye-Farīmān, and Qal‘eh-ye Now-ye Farīmān) is a village in Fariman Rural District of the Central District in Fariman County, Razavi Khorasan province, Iran.

== Demographics ==
=== Population ===
At the time of the 2006 National Census, the village's population was 3,310 in 772 households. The following census in 2011 counted 3,653 people in 975 households. The 2016 census measured the population of the village as 3,722 people in 1,053 households, the most populous in its rural district.
