= Aqar-e Sofla =

Aqar-e Sofla اقرسفلي
- Village
- Location within Iran
- Coordinates: 35°44′53″N 59°55′54″E
- Country: Iran
- Province: Razavi Khorasan
- County: Fariman
- Bakhsh: Central
- Rural District: Fariman

Population (2006)
  - Total: 20
- Time zone: UTC+3:30 (IRST)
  - Summer (DST): UTC+4:30 (IRDT)

Aqar-e Sofla (Persian: اقرسفلي, also Romanized as Aqar-e Soflá; also known as ‘Aqar-e Pā’īn) is a village in Fariman Rural District, in the Central District of Fariman County, Razavi Khorasan Province, Iran. At the 2006 census, its population was 20, in 5 families.

== See also ==
- List of cities, towns and villages in Razavi Khorasan Province
