= Sar Dasht, Razavi Khorasan =

Village in Razavi Khorasan province, Iran

Sar Dasht Persian: سردشت
- Village
- Location within Iran
- Coordinates: 35°37′39″N 59°35′11″E
- Country: Iran
- Province: Razavi Khorasan
- County: Fariman
- District: Central
- Rural District: Balaband

Population (2016)
  - Total: 633
- Time zone: UTC+3:30 (IRST)

Sar Dasht (Persian: سردشت) (Note: Also romanized as Sar-i-Dasht) is a village in Balaband Rural District of the Central District in Fariman County, Razavi Khorasan province, Iran.

== Demographics ==
=== Population ===
At the time of the 2006 National Census, the village's population was 674 in 163 households. The following census in 2011 counted 608 people in 175 households. The 2016 census measured the population of the village as 633 people in 183 households.
