= Aq Kamar-e Olya =

Aq Kamar-e Olya اق كمرعليا
- Village
- Location within Iran
- Coordinates: 35°38′34″N 59°32′31″E
- Country: Iran
- Province: Razavi Khorasan
- County: Fariman
- Bakhsh: Central
- Rural District: Balaband

Population (2006)
  - Total: 129
- Time zone: UTC+3:30 (IRST)
  - Summer (DST): UTC+4:30 (IRDT)

Aq Kamar-e Olya (Persian: اق كمرعليا, also Romanized as Āq Kamar-e ‘Olyā; also known as Āq Kamar-e Bālā) is a village in Balaband Rural District, in the Central District of Fariman County, Razavi Khorasan Province, Iran. At the 2006 census, its population was 129, in 31 families.

== See also ==
- List of cities, towns and villages in Razavi Khorasan Province
