= Bozjani =

Village in Razavi Khorasan province, Iran

Bozjani Persian: بزجاني
- Village
- Location within Iran
- Coordinates: 35°47′55″N 59°35′35″E
- Country: Iran
- Province: Razavi Khorasan
- County: Fariman
- District: Central
- Rural District: Sang Bast

Population (2016)
  - Total: 635
- Time zone: UTC+3:30 (IRST)

Bozjani (Persian: بزجاني) (Note: Also romanized as Bozjānī; also known as Bozhgānī) is a village in Sang Bast Rural District of the Central District in Fariman County, Razavi Khorasan province, Iran.

== Demographics ==
=== Population ===
At the time of the 2006 National Census, the village's population was 533 in 142 households. The following census in 2011 counted 602 people in 185 households. The 2016 census measured the population of the village as 635 people in 198 households.
