= Nari, Razavi Khorasan =

Village in Razavi Khorasan province, Iran

Nari Persian: ناري
- Village
- Location within Iran
- Coordinates: 35°31′51″N 59°38′58″E
- Country: Iran
- Province: Razavi Khorasan
- County: Fariman
- District: Central
- Rural District: Balaband

Population (2016)
  - Total: 314
- Time zone: UTC+3:30 (IRST)

Nari (Persian: ناري) (Note: Also romanized as Nārī) is a village in Balaband Rural District of the Central District in Fariman County, Razavi Khorasan province, Iran.

== Demographics ==
=== Population ===
At the time of the 2006 National Census, the village's population was 379 in 80 households. The following census in 2011 counted 308 people in 78 households. The 2016 census measured the population of the village as 314 people in 97 households.
