= Bagh Abbas, Razavi Khorasan =

Village in Razavi Khorasan province, Iran

Bagh Abbas Persian: باغ عباس
- Village
- Location within Iran
- Coordinates: 35°34′38″N 59°44′29″E
- Country: Iran
- Province: Razavi Khorasan
- County: Fariman
- District: Central
- Rural District: Balaband

Population (2016)
  - Total: 355
- Time zone: UTC+3:30 (IRST)

Bagh Abbas (Persian: باغ عباس) (Note: Also romanized as Bāgh ‘Abbās) is a village in Balaband Rural District of the Central District in Fariman County, Razavi Khorasan province, Iran.

== Demographics ==
=== Population ===
At the time of the 2006 National Census, the village's population was 410 in 97 households. The following census in 2011 counted 348 people in 89 households. The 2016 census measured the population of the village as 355 people in 105 households.
