= Aqa Bil-e Sofla =

Aqa Bil-e Sofla اقابيل سفلي
- Village
- Location within Iran
- Coordinates: 35°31′57″N 59°31′08″E
- Country: Iran
- Province: Razavi Khorasan
- County: Fariman
- Bakhsh: Central
- Rural District: Balaband

Population (2006)
  - Total: 64
- Time zone: UTC+3:30 (IRST)
  - Summer (DST): UTC+4:30 (IRDT)

Aqa Bil-e Sofla (Persian: اقابيل سفلي, also Romanized as Āqā Bīl-e Soflá; also known as Āqā Bīl-e Pā’īn) is a village in Balaband Rural District, in the Central District of Fariman County, Razavi Khorasan Province, Iran. At the 2006 census, its population was 64, in 14 families.

== See also ==
- List of cities, towns and villages in Razavi Khorasan Province
