= Eshqabad, Fariman =

Village in Razavi Khorasan province, Iran

Eshqabad Persian: عشق اباد
- Village
- Location within Iran
- Coordinates: 35°40′12″N 59°46′07″E
- Country: Iran
- Province: Razavi Khorasan
- County: Fariman
- District: Central
- Rural District: Fariman

Population (2016)
  - Total: 1,287
- Time zone: UTC+3:30 (IRST)

Eshqabad (Persian: عشق اباد) (Note: Also romanized as ʿ‘Eshqābād, ‘Ishaqābād, and ‘Ishqābād) is a village in Fariman Rural District of the Central District in Fariman County, Razavi Khorasan province, Iran.

== Demographics ==
=== Population ===
At the time of the 2006 National Census, the village's population was 1,038 in 244 households. The following census in 2011 counted 1,248 people in 338 households. The 2016 census measured the population of the village as 1,287 people in 382 households.
