= Aq Kamar-e Sofla =

Village in Razavi Khorasan province, Iran

Aq Kamar-e Sofla Persian: اق كمرسفلي
- Village
- Location within Iran
- Coordinates: 35°36′08″N 59°32′33″E
- Country: Iran
- Province: Razavi Khorasan
- County: Fariman
- District: Central
- Rural District: Balaband

Population (2016)
  - Total: 347
- Time zone: UTC+3:30 (IRST)

Aq Kamar-e Sofla (Persian: اق كمرسفلي) (Note: Also romanized as Āq Kamar-e Soflá; also known as Āq Kamar-e Pā’īn) is a village in Balaband Rural District of the Central District in Fariman County, Razavi Khorasan province, Iran.

== Demographics ==
=== Population ===
At the time of the 2006 National Census, the village's population was 431 in 97 households. The following census in 2011 counted 374 people in 99 households. The 2016 census measured the population of the village as 347 people in 97 households.
