= Aqar-e Olya =

Village in Razavi Khorasan province, Iran

Aqar-e Olya Persian: اقرعليا
- Village
- Location within Iran
- Coordinates: 35°47′14″N 59°56′01″E
- Country: Iran
- Province: Razavi Khorasan
- County: Fariman
- District: Central
- Rural District: Fariman

Population (2016)
  - Total: 1,293
- Time zone: UTC+3:30 (IRST)

Aqar-e Olya (Persian: اقرعليا) (Note: Also romanized as Aqar ‘Olyā and Aqar-e ‘Olyā; also known as Aqar, Aqar-e Bālā, and ‘Aqar-e Bālā) is a village in Fariman Rural District of the Central District in Fariman County, Razavi Khorasan province, Iran.

== Demographics ==
=== Population ===
At the time of the 2006 National Census, the village's population was 993 in 202 households. The following census in 2011 counted 1,165 people in 291 households. The 2016 census measured the population of the village as 1,293 people in 327 households.
