= Uzbekistan Airways =

Flag carrier of Uzbekistan

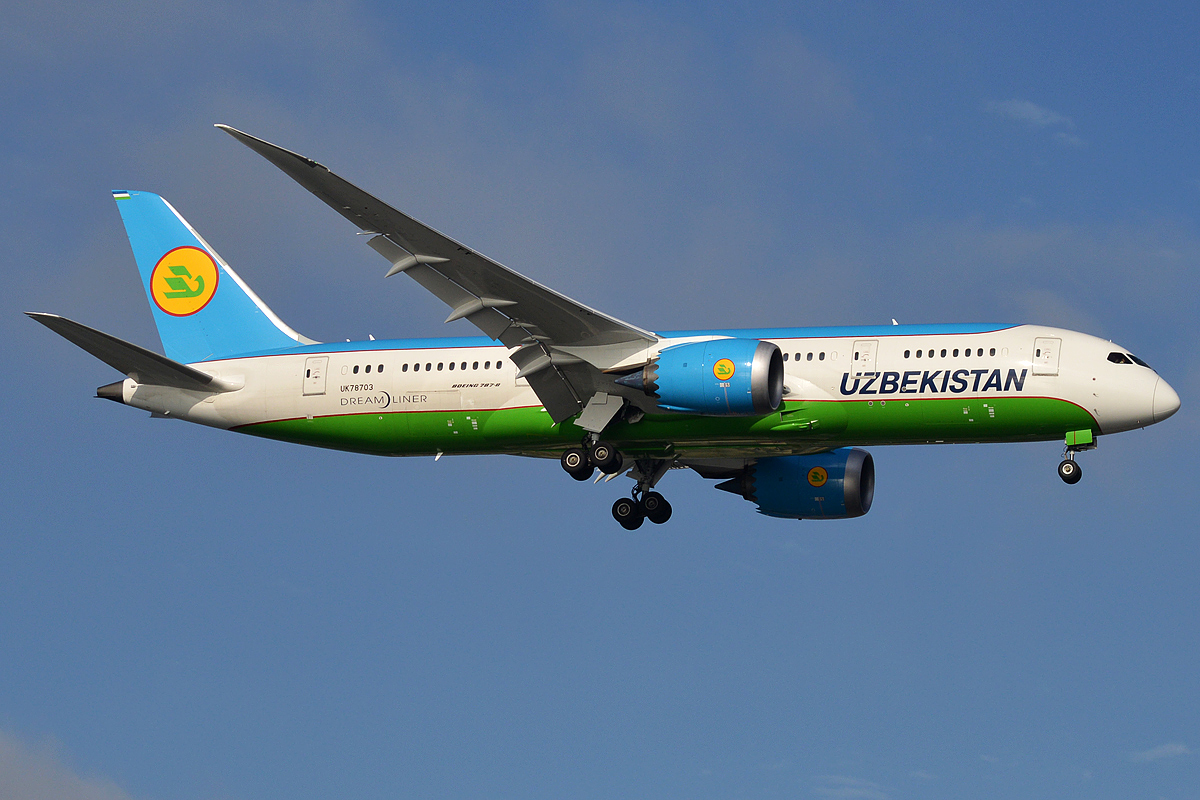
- Uzbekistan Airways Boeing 787-8
IATA	ICAO	Call sign
HY	UZB	UZBEK
- Founded: 28 January 1992; 34 years ago
- Commenced operations: 31 May 1992; 34 years ago
- Hubs: Tashkent International Airport
- Frequent-flyer program: Uz Air Plus
- Subsidiaries: Uzbekistan Airways Express
- Fleet size: 45
- Destinations: 58
- Parent company: Government of Uzbekistan
- Headquarters: Tashkent, Uzbekistan
- Key people: Shukhrat Khudaykulov (CEO).
- Website: uzairways.com

JSC Uzbekistan Airways, operating as Uzbekistan Airways, (Note: Uzbek: Oʻzbekiston Havo Yoʻllari, cyrillized: Ўзбекистон Ҳаво Йўллари, arabized: اۉزبېكستان هوا يۉللرى, IPA: [ɵzˌbekɪsˈtɔn ɦɐˈʋɔ jɵlˈlarɪ̆]) is the flag carrier of Uzbekistan, headquartered in Tashkent. From its hub at Islam Karimov Tashkent International Airport, the airline serves a number of domestic destinations; the company also flies international services to Asia, Europe and North America.

== History ==
Following the dissolution of the Soviet Union, Uzbek President Islam Karimov in 1992 authorised the creation of Uzbekistan Airways. The airline was established on 28 January 1992, and took over the operations of the Uzbekistan division of Aeroflot on 31 May 1992. In 1993, Uzbekistan Airways acquired its first two Airbus A310-300s. The two A310s were counted as part of the fleet at March 1995, along with Ukrainian and Russian-built aircraft (25 Antonov An-24/26s, one Ilyushin Il-62, 13 Ilyushin Il-76s, one Ilyushin Il-86, 23 Tupolev Tu-154, and three Yakovlev Yak-40s). By this time, the airline was still the sole operator in the country. In late 1995, the carrier ordered its first Boeing aircraft: two Boeing 767-300ERs and a single Boeing 757.

Uzbekistan Airways was the launch customer for the Ilyushin Il-114; it took delivery of the first, locally assembled aircraft, in July 1998. In June 1998, the airline took delivery of the last-built Airbus A310 ever (msn. 706, reg. UK-31003). Two more Boeing 757-200s were directly ordered from Boeing in April 1999. Late in 1999, the company took ownership of the first of these two 184-seater Boeing 757-200.

By April 2000, the airline had 16,296 employees. At this time, its fleet comprised three Airbus A310-300s, three Antonov An-12s, one Antonov An-24, 18 Antonov An-24Bs, three Antonov An-24RVs, three Boeing 757-200s, two Boeing 767-300ERs, three Avro RJ85s, four Ilyushin Il-114s, two Ilyushin Il-62s, six Ilyushin Il-62Ms, ten Ilyushin Il-76Ts, nine Ilyushin Il-86s, 15 Tupolev Tu-154Bs, two Tupolev Tu-154Ms and 19 Yakovlev Yak-40s. Destinations served at the time included Almaty, Amsterdam, Andizhan, Ashgabat, Athens, Baku, Bangkok, Beijing, Bishkek, Bukhara, Chelyabinsk, Delhi, Dhaka, Ekaterinburg, Fergana, Frankfurt, Istanbul, Jeddah, Karshi, Kazan, Khabarovsk, Kuala Lumpur, London, Mineralnye Vody, Moscow, Namangan, New York, Novosibirsk, Nukus, Omsk, Paris, Riyadh, Rostov-on-Don, Samara, Samarkand, Seoul, Sharjah, Simferopol, St. Petersburg, Tashkent, Tel Aviv, Termez, Tyumen, Ufa and Urgench. Two more Boeing 767-300ERs, equipped with Pratt & Whitney PW4000 powerplants, were ordered in 2001.

Uzbekistan Airways carried 2.625 million passengers in 2014, a 1.9% decrease year-on-year (YOY), whereas 4.6% more cargo was handled YOY.

=== Fleet modernisation and expansion (2016-2020) ===
Uzbekistan Airways began an expansion of its operations in the mid-2010s following the election in 2016 of President Shavkat Mirziyoyev, who saw development of the aviation sector as a priority for the country. This involved the help of the World Bank, who agreed to help modernise and liberalise the Uzbek market. Signs of this modernisation included the development of Uzbekistan Airways’ fleet from old Soviet aircraft to newer Western variants from Boeing and Airbus. In August 2016 just before Mirziyoyev’s election, the airline took delivery of its first Boeing 787-8, which was initially deployed on the carrier’s flagship route to New York-JFK. In 2017 the airline carried 2.7 million passengers, a number almost 10% higher than the year before. This growth continued in 2018 as 3.1 million passengers flew with the airline, with 1.9 million of these being international passengers. Expansion was aided by the opening of several routes to previously unserved cities, with the airline listing Jeddah, Mumbai and Vladivostok as new destinations in a 2018 press release.

In May 2018 the airline's modernisation progressed as it transitioned to an all-jet fleet, following the retirement of its 52-seat Ilyushin Il-114 turboprops. As part of this process the airline received its first Airbus A320neo in March 2019. This was the first of an order for 2 from the European manufacturer but was later supplemented by an order for 8 additional A320neos, as well as 4 of the larger A321neos.2019 also saw the addition of more new international destinations thanks to these deliveries, with flights to Tbilisi, Munich and Karachi being launched.

=== Continued growth (2021-) ===
Following the COVID-19 pandemic Uzbekistan Airways relaunched operations on domestic rotations at the end of March 2021 followed by linking Tashkent to Moscow a couple of weeks later, initially once weekly. In June 2021 the airline transferred its Moscow operations from Vnukovo Airport to Domodedovo Airport, with the flight from Tashkent being flown 4-times weekly.

In February 2022 the airline received its first A321LR from Airbus. According to the then chairman Ilhom Mahkamov the aircraft will fly to a mix of international cities in Europe, Asia, and the Middle East, as well as complimenting the existing A320neo fleet on domestic services.

Uzbekistan Airways ended 2024 in good financial shape having carried over 6 million passengers according to its annual report, an increase of 20% on the year before, with a load factor of 83%. The airline also saw an increase in its yearly profit with an increase of almost 70% to UZS687 billion soums, or approximately $56 million US dollars. This strong financial performance was aided by the launch of 11 new routes including Nha Trang and Phi Quoc in Vietnam as the airline continued to expand internationally with the arrival of its new A321LRs.

In late 2025 the airline made two major announcements regarding expansion of its fleet. The first was an order for 14 Boeing 787-9 Dreamliners, which was later increased to 22 in November following the conversion of 8 options the airline held. News of the second order came shortly after, with the airline announcing that 4 more Airbus A321neo aircraft would be joining the fleet in partnership with China Aircraft Leasing Group (CALC), bringing the total commitment to the type up to 6. These aircraft will be configured in a two-class configuration featuring 16 seats in business class and 156 in economy, with expected delivery between 2027 and 2028.

The start of 2026 brought more good news for the Uzbek flag carrier as it revealed a profit for the previous year of over $100million US dollars, as well as record passenger numbers of 6.6 million, over double the amount compared to 2018 Nonetheless the airline does face challenges, as its rapid growth has been hampered by a shortage of new aircraft. Chairman Shukhrat Khudaykulov commented that whilst the airline operated more than 52,000 flights throughout the year, an increase of 8% compared to 2024, this 8% growth is “Modest” and that there still remains “…significant unmet demand”.

Despite facing delays in deliveries of new aircraft Uzbekistan Airways has pushed ahead with regional expansion in cities outside the capital such as Andijan in the east of the country with new links to its Tashkent hub, Saint Petersburg and Moscow in Russia, as well as the Turkish capital Istanbul. The airline had stopped services from the airport in March 2023, but after a hiatus of 2 and a half years will now operate 10 flights a week operated with A320neos. The nearby city of Namangan also saw growth with new connections to Krasnodar in Russia as well as New Delhi, the city’s first Indian route. Tashkent has also seen regional expansion, with a new twice-weekly route to the Kazakh city of Atyrau starting from March 2026. March also sees the launch of flight to a pair of new cities in China with the new A321LRs serving Hangzhou, and Shenzhen being linked to Tashkent with the 787-8. The airline expects to receive 4 additional aircraft in 2026 to support this expansion, bringing its total number above 50 for the first time. The chairman anticipates that the fleet will double in size by 2030, stating “We already see strong market demand and intend to expand further”.

== Destinations ==
Since its formation, Uzbekistan Airways has focused its passenger service on Western Europe and other international locations. Most international flights operate from Tashkent, although international services to other Uzbek cities exist. The carrier is not part of any partnership or airline alliance.

=== Codeshare agreements ===
Uzbekistan Airways has codeshare agreements with the following airlines:

- airBaltic
- Asiana Airlines
- Azerbaijan Airlines
- Belavia
- China Southern Airlines
- Etihad Airways
- Korean Air
- Malaysia Airlines
- S7 Airlines
- Turkish Airlines
- Ural Airlines

=== Interline agreements ===
Uzbekistan Airways has interline agreements with the following airlines:

- AccesRail (Railway)
- Aeroflot
- Air Astana
- airBaltic
- Air Europa
- Air France
- All Nippon Airways
- APG Airlines
- Arkia
- Asiana Airlines
- Azerbaijan Airlines
- Bangkok Airways
- Belavia
- China Southern Airlines
- Czech Airlines
- Delta Air Lines
- Etihad Airways
- Flynas
- Flydubai
- Garuda Indonesia
- Hahn Air
- Iberia
- Japan Airlines
- Kam Air
- KLM
- Korean Air
- Lufthansa
- Malaysia Airlines
- Qantas
- Qatar Airways
- S7 Airlines
- Singapore Airlines
- SriLankan Airlines
- Thai Airways International
- Turkish Airlines
- Ural Airlines

== Fleet ==
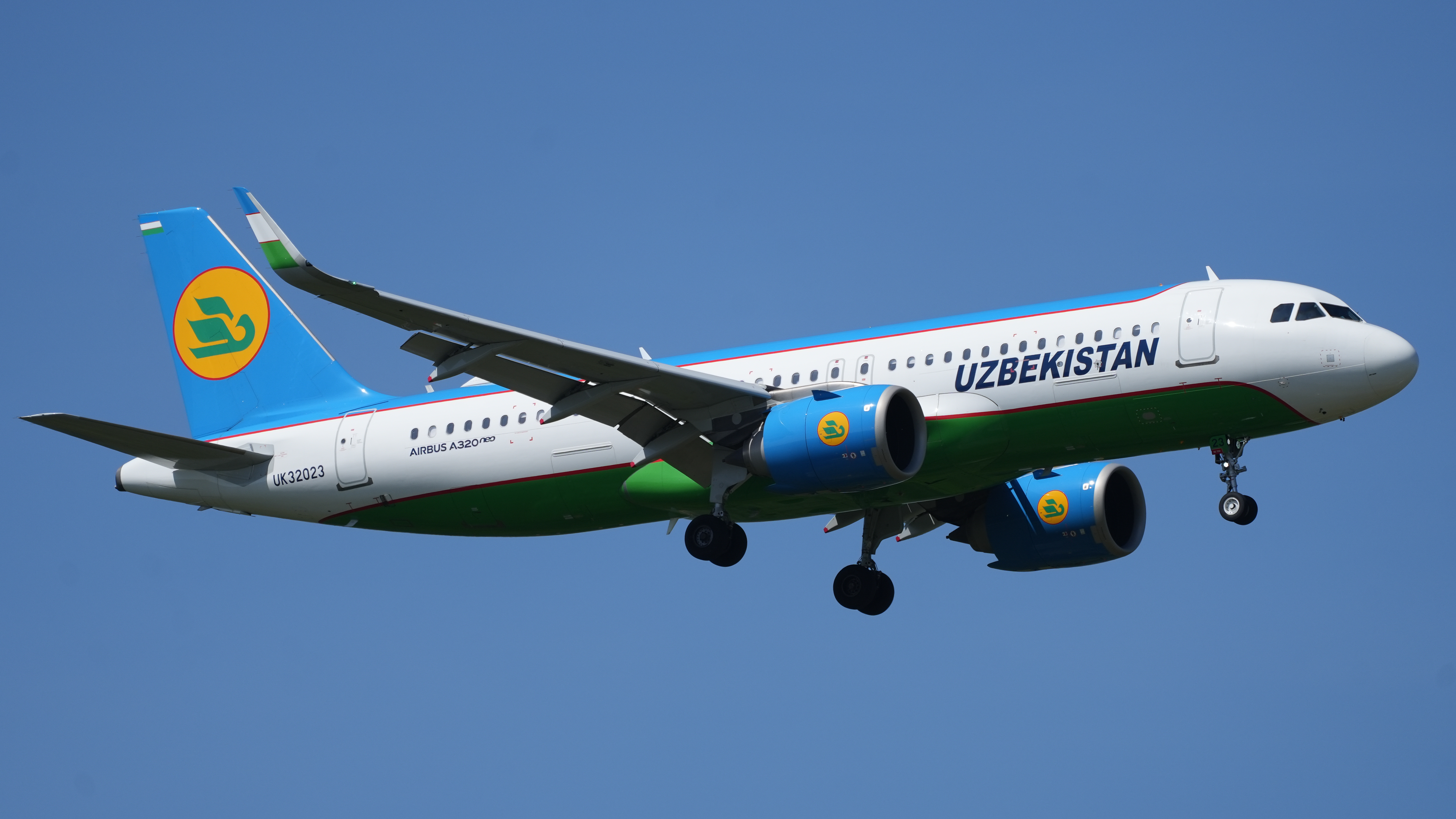
Uzbekistan Airways Airbus A320neo

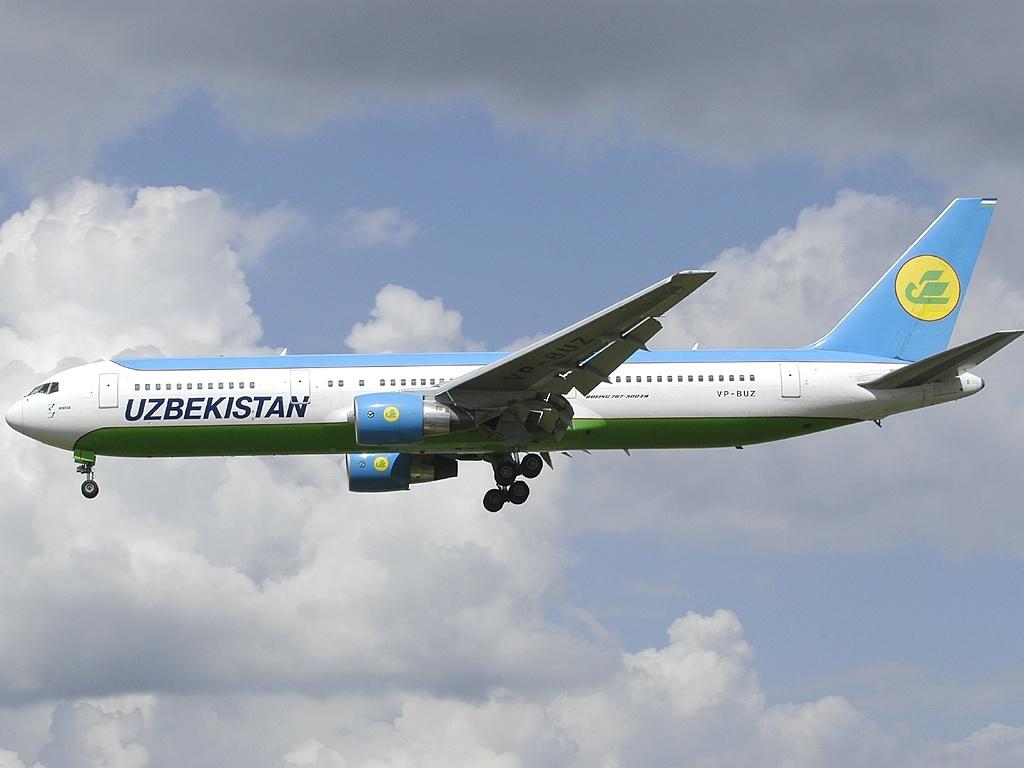
Uzbekistan Airways Boeing 767-300ER

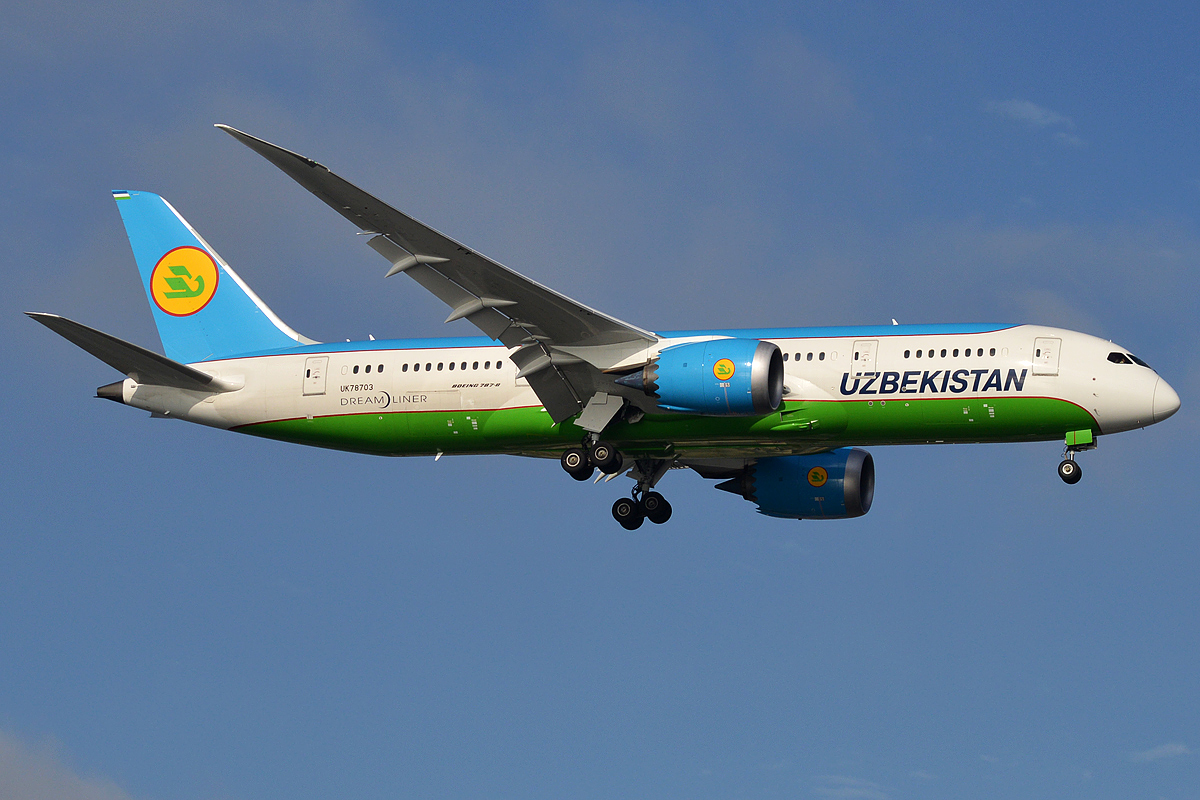
Uzbekistan Airways Boeing 787-8

=== Current fleet ===
As of February 2025, the airline operates the following aircraft:

Uzbekistan Airways fleet
Aircraft	In service	Orders	Passengers			Notes
Aircraft	In service	Orders	J	Y	Total	Notes
Airbus A320-200	9	—	12	138	150	
Airbus A320neo	10	—	12	138	150	
Airbus A321LR	5	—	16	172	188	
Airbus A321neo	—	14	TBA			
Boeing 767-300ER	5	—	15	232	247	
Boeing 767-300ER	5	—	18	246	264	
Boeing 787-8	7	—	24	222	246	
Boeing 787-8	7	—	24	246	270	
Boeing 787-9	—	22	TBA			
Let L-410 Turbolet	4	—	—	19	19	
Uzbekistan Airways Cargo fleet
Boeing 767-300BCF	2	—	Cargo			
Ilyushin Il-76TD	2	—	Cargo			
Total	44	36				

Additionally, the airline operates two Airbus A320s in VIP configuration and one Pilatus PC-24.

=== Fleet development ===
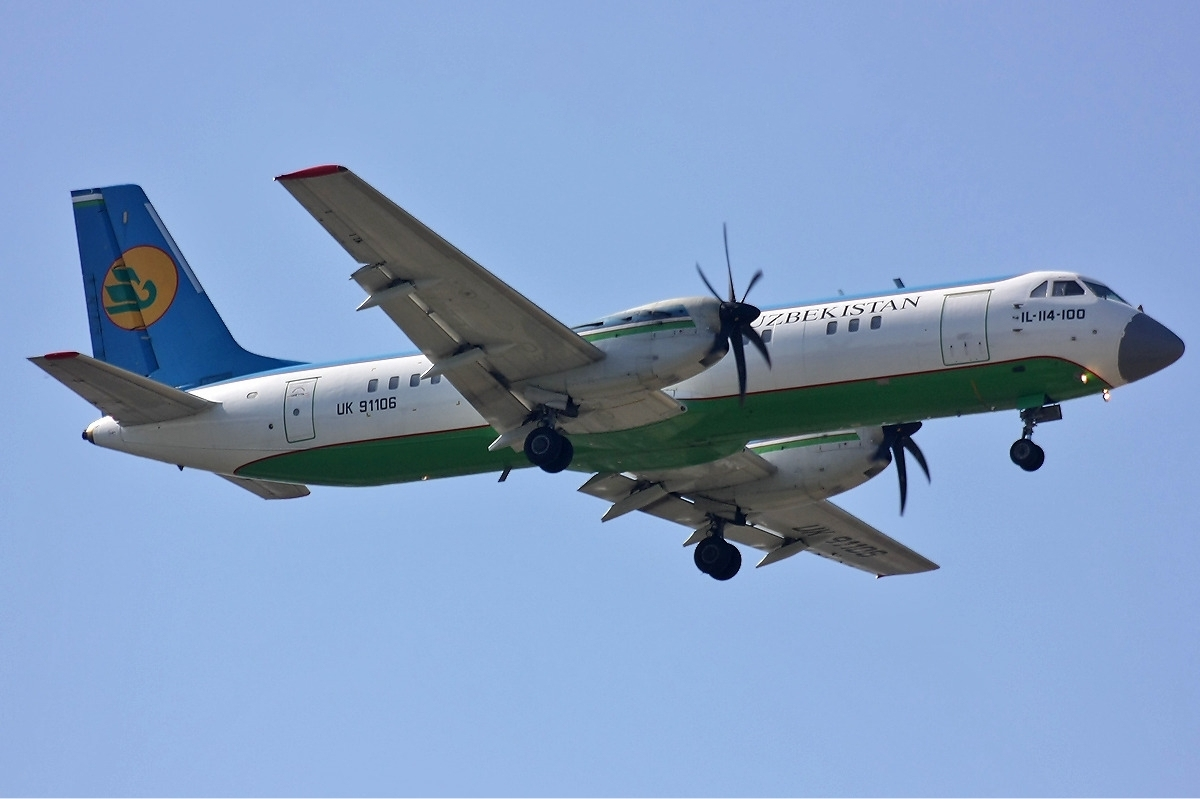
Uzbekistan Airways was the launch customer of the Ilyushin Il-114

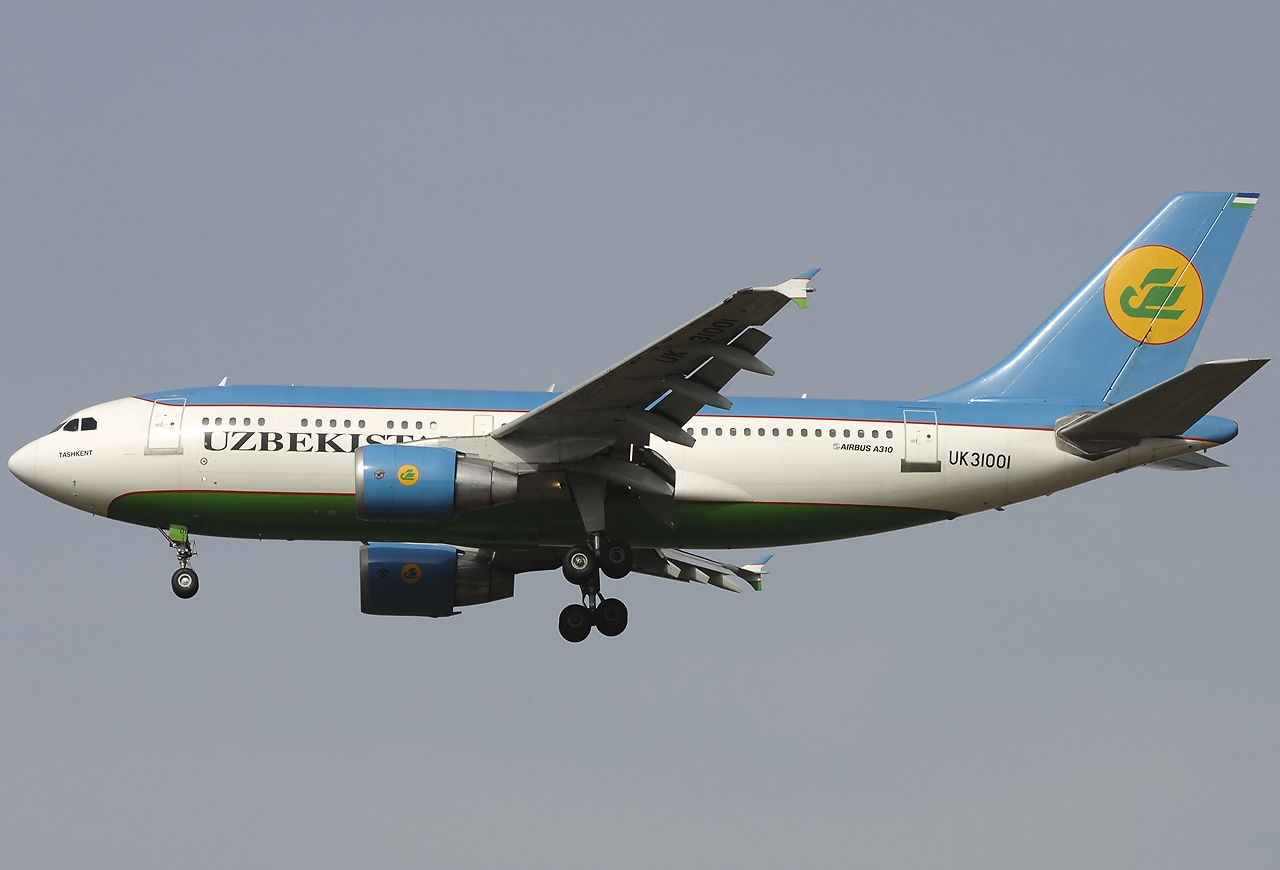
An Airbus A310-300, 2010. This type of aircraft was first acquired by the airline in 1993. Uzbekistan Airways retired the type from active service in July 2013.

In mid 2007, the carrier ordered six Airbus A320s; by that time the fleet was 55 strong, comprising ten different aircraft models; the Russian-built Yakovlev Yak-40 was among them. Also that year, the airline ordered two Boeing 787-8s.

In late 2008, the company ordered four Boeing 767-300ERs in a US$597 million deal, and the A320 order was boosted to ten aircraft. The airline took delivery of its first A320 in July 2010; the type started operations servicing the Tashkent–Baku route. The first of four Boeing 767-300ERs ordered in 2008 was delivered in February 2012, coinciding with the carrier's 20th anniversary. Also in 2012, the airline retired the An-24 from active service. It was announced in May 2013 that the Islamic Development Bank signed a deal for US$270 million with the Government of Uzbekistan that will be partly (US$170 million) used to finance the acquisition of two Boeing aircraft, yet the type involved was not disclosed. In July 2013, the Airbus A310 was retired from active service.

The carrier ordered the Boeing 767-300ER for the first time in 1995. It decided to convert two of the oldest Boeing 767-300ERs into freighters subsequently. Conversion of the first aircraft was completed in December 2014. In late December 2014, the second converted aircraft arrived in Tashkent.

Uzbekistan Airways received its first Boeing 787-8 in late August 2016. The Business Class on the 787 features the first fully flat seats of the carrier.

In 2023, the carrier ordered two Let 410UVPs with an option for further two of these aircraft; the first of them was delivered in June 2023. The airline operated with Airbus A330 aircraft in 2023 under wet-lease from Qanot Sharq.

=== Retired fleet ===
Uzbekistan Airways previously operated the following aircraft:

- Airbus A300-600F
- Airbus A310-300
- Antonov An-24B
- Antonov An-24RV
- Avro RJ85
- Boeing 757-200
- Ilyushin Il-62
- Ilyushin Il-62M
- Ilyushin Il-76T
- Ilyushin Il-86
- Ilyushin Il-114-100
- Tupolev Tu-154B
- Tupolev Tu-154M
- Yakovlev Yak-40

== Accidents and incidents ==
According to the Aviation Safety Network, as of January 2013, the airline experienced eight accidents and incidents throughout its history, totalling 54 reported fatalities; only those involving fatalities and hull-losses are listed below.

Date	Location	Aircraft	Tail number	Fatalities	Description of the event	Refs
17 June 1995	Nukus, Uzbekistan	Antonov An-2R	UK-33058	Unknown	Crashed 43 km (27 mi) away from the city under undisclosed circumstances.	
26 August 1999	Turtkul, Uzbekistan	Yakovlev Yak-40	UK-87848	2/33	The aircraft was operating a domestic scheduled Tashkent–Turtkul passenger service when it struck power lines, gear-up, after a second go-around at Turtkul Airport. It belly landed, and slid for some 130 m (430 ft), before coming to rest close to an embankment.	
13 January 2004	Tashkent, Uzbekistan	Yakovlev Yak-40	UK-87985	37/37	The airplane was completing a domestic scheduled Termez–Tashkent passenger service as Flight 1154 when it landed more than 250 m (820 ft) past the runway threshold at Tashkent Airport. As the aircraft continued its run, the right wing struck a concrete building. Moments later the left wing was lost. The aircraft hit a concrete wall that caused the airframe to break up, eventually coming to rest into a ditch and catching fire.	
19 October 2006	Aranchi, Uzbekistan	Antonov An-2TP	UK-70152	15/15	Crashed amid bad weather, on approach to the Aranchi airfield, while operating a military training flight.	
August 2009	Zarafshan, Uzbekistan	Antonov An-24RV	UK-46658	0	Premature retraction of the undercarriage during the takeoff run at Zarafshan Airport.	

== See also ==
- List of airlines of Uzbekistan
- Transport in Uzbekistan
