= Zareabad =

Zareabad (Persian: زارع اباد) may refer to:

- Zareabad, Ardabil
- Zareabad, Hamadan
