= Miandehi, Fariman =

Village in Razavi Khorasan province, Iran

Miandehi Persian: مياندهي
- Village
- Location within Iran
- Coordinates: 35°33′50″N 59°32′08″E
- Country: Iran
- Province: Razavi Khorasan
- County: Fariman
- District: Central
- Rural District: Balaband

Population (2016)
  - Total: 628
- Time zone: UTC+3:30 (IRST)

Miandehi (Persian: مياندهي) (Note: Also romanized as Mīāndehī) is a village in Balaband Rural District of the Central District in Fariman County, Razavi Khorasan province, Iran.

== Demographics ==
=== Population ===
At the time of the 2006 National Census, the village's population was 616 in 137 households. The following census in 2011 counted 703 people in 193 households. The 2016 census measured the population of the village as 628 people in 188 households.
