= Karizmeh =

Village in Razavi Khorasan province, Iran

Karizmeh Persian: كاريزمه
- Village
- Location within Iran
- Coordinates: 35°54′38″N 59°39′12″E
- Country: Iran
- Province: Razavi Khorasan
- County: Fariman
- District: Central
- Rural District: Sang Bast

Population (2016)
  - Total: 344
- Time zone: UTC+3:30 (IRST)

Karizmeh (Persian: كاريزمه) (Note: Also romanized as Kārīzmeh; also known as Kārīs Meh and Kārīsmā) is a village in Sang Bast Rural District of the Central District in Fariman County, Razavi Khorasan province, Iran.

== Demographics ==
=== Population ===
At the time of the 2006 National Census, the village's population was 361 in 97 households. The following census in 2011 counted 343 people in 108 households. The 2016 census measured the population of the village as 344 people in 113 households.
