= Sang Bast, Razavi Khorasan =

Village in Razavi Khorasan province, Iran

Sang Bast Persian: سنگ بست
- Village
- Location within Iran
- Coordinates: 35°59′31″N 59°46′18″E
- Country: Iran
- Province: Razavi Khorasan
- County: Fariman
- District: Central
- Rural District: Sang Bast

Population (2016)
  - Total: 786
- Time zone: UTC+3:30 (IRST)

Sang Bast (Persian: سنگ بست) (Note: Also known as Sang Dasht) is a village in, and the capital of, Sang Bast Rural District in the Central District of Fariman County, Razavi Khorasan province, Iran.

== Demographics ==
=== Population ===
At the time of the 2006 National Census, the village's population was 670 in 187 households. The following census in 2011 counted 803 people in 226 households. The 2016 census measured the population of the village as 786 people in 243 households.
