= Miandehi =

Miandehi or Miyandehi or Meyandehi (Persian: مياندهي) may refer to:

- Miandehi, Fariman
- Miandehi, Mahvelat
