= Havas, Iran =

Village in Razavi Khorasan province, Iran

Havas Persian: هوس
- Village
- Location within Iran
- Coordinates: 35°38′20″N 59°48′33″E
- Country: Iran
- Province: Razavi Khorasan
- County: Fariman
- District: Central
- Rural District: Fariman

Population (2016)
  - Total: 397
- Time zone: UTC+3:30 (IRST)

Havas (Persian: هوس) (Note: Also romanized as Hawās) is a village in Fariman Rural District of the Central District in Fariman County, Razavi Khorasan province, Iran.

== Demographics ==
=== Population ===
At the time of the 2006 National Census, the village's population was 434 in 96 households. The following census in 2011 counted 373 people in 99 households. The 2016 census measured the population of the village as 397 people in 114 households.
