= Lushab-e Fariman =

Village in Razavi Khorasan province, Iran

Lushab-e Fariman Persian: لوشاب فريمان
- Village
- Location within Iran
- Coordinates: 35°39′01″N 59°48′59″E
- Country: Iran
- Province: Razavi Khorasan
- County: Fariman
- District: Central
- Rural District: Fariman

Population (2016)
  - Total: 1,090
- Time zone: UTC+3:30 (IRST)

Lushab-e Fariman (Persian: لوشاب فريمان) (Note: Also romanized as Lūshāb-e Farīmān; also known as Lūshāb, Lūshāb-e Qalandarābād, and Lushal) is a village in Fariman Rural District of the Central District in Fariman County, Razavi Khorasan province, Iran.

== Demographics ==
=== Population ===
At the time of the 2006 National Census, the village's population was 937 in 207 households. The following census in 2011 counted 1,045 people in 269 households. The 2016 census measured the population of the village as 1,090 people in 311 households.
