= Kalateh-ye Khvosh =

Kalateh-ye Khvosh (Persian: كلاته خوش) may refer to:

- Kalateh-ye Khvosh, North Khorasan
- Kalateh-ye Khvosh, Razavi Khorasan
