= Karizma =

Karizma may refer to:

- Karizma (musician) (born 1970), American musician
- Karizma (Serbian band), Serbian hard rock/glam metal band
- KariZma (pop band), Bulgarian pop duo
- Hero Honda Karizma R or Hero Honda Karizma ZMR, motorcycles manufactured by Hero MotoCorp, India
- Karizma, a 2009 album by Turkish singer Mustafa Sandal
- Karizma, a 2023 album by Lebanese singer Najwa Karam

== See also ==
- Call Me Karizma, American musician
- Karizmeh, a village in Razavi Khorasan Province, Iran
