= Kachalar =

Village in Ardabil province, Iran

Kachalar Persian: كچلر
- Village
- Location within Iran
- Coordinates: 39°04′15″N 48°04′10″E
- Country: Iran
- Province: Ardabil
- County: Germi
- District: Central
- Rural District: Ojarud-e Shomali

Population (2016)
  - Total: 64
- Time zone: UTC+3:30 (IRST)

Kachalar (Persian: كچلر) (Note: Also known as Kachalar-e Kordlar) is a village in Ojarud-e Shomali Rural District of the Central District in Germi County, (Note: Formerly Moghan County) Ardabil province, Iran.

== Demographics ==
=== Population ===
At the time of the 2006 National Census, the village's population was 68 in 13 households. The following census in 2011 counted 67 people in 17 households. The 2016 census measured the population of the village as 64 people in 18 households.
