= Sayadabad =

Village in Ardabil province, Iran

Sayadabad Persian: صياداباد
- Village
- Location within Iran
- Country: Iran
- Province: Ardabil
- County: Germi
- District: Central
- Rural District: Ojarud-e Shomali

Population (2016)
  - Total: 194
- Time zone: UTC+3:30 (IRST)

Sayadabad (Persian: صياداباد) (Note: Also romanized as Şayādābād) is a village in Ojarud-e Shomali Rural District of the Central District in Germi County, (Note: Formerly Moghan County) Ardabil province, Iran.

== Demographics ==
=== Population ===
At the time of the 2006 National Census, the village's population was 194 in 60 households, when it was in Angut-e Sharqi Rural District of Ungut District. (Note: Renamed the Central District of Ungut County) The following census in 2011 counted 315 people in 68 households. The 2016 census measured the population of the village as 194 people in 60 households.

In 2019, the district was separated from the county in the establishment of Ungut County and renamed the Central District. Sayadabad was transferred to Ojarud-e Shomali Rural District of the Central District in Germi County.
