= Farhadgerd =

City in Razavi Khorasan province, Iran

Farhadgerd Persian: فرهادگرد
- City
- Location within Iran
- Coordinates: 35°45′55″N 59°44′03″E
- Country: Iran
- Province: Razavi Khorasan
- County: Fariman
- District: Central
- Established as a city: 2003

Population (2016)
  - Total: 8,442
- Time zone: UTC+3:30 (IRST)

Farhadgerd (Persian: فرهادگرد) (Note: Also romanized as Farhādgerd; also known as Farāgerd, Farāh Gird, and Farājerd) is a city in the Central District of Fariman County, Razavi Khorasan province, Iran, serving as the administrative center for Fariman Rural District.

== History ==
In 2003, the villages of Eqbaliyeh (اقبالیه), Farhadgerd (فرهادگرد), Naman (نعمان), Qaleh-ye Now-e Farhadgerd (قلعه نوفرهادگرد), and Sharifabad (شریف آباد) were merged to form the new city of Farhadgerd.

== Demographics ==
=== Population ===
At the time of the 2006 National Census, the city population was 6,620 in 1,607 households. The following census in 2011 counted 7,647 people in 2,070 households. The 2016 census measured the population of the city as 8,442 people in 2,380 households.
