= Fariman =

City in Razavi Khorasan Province, Iran

Fariman Persian: فريمان
- City
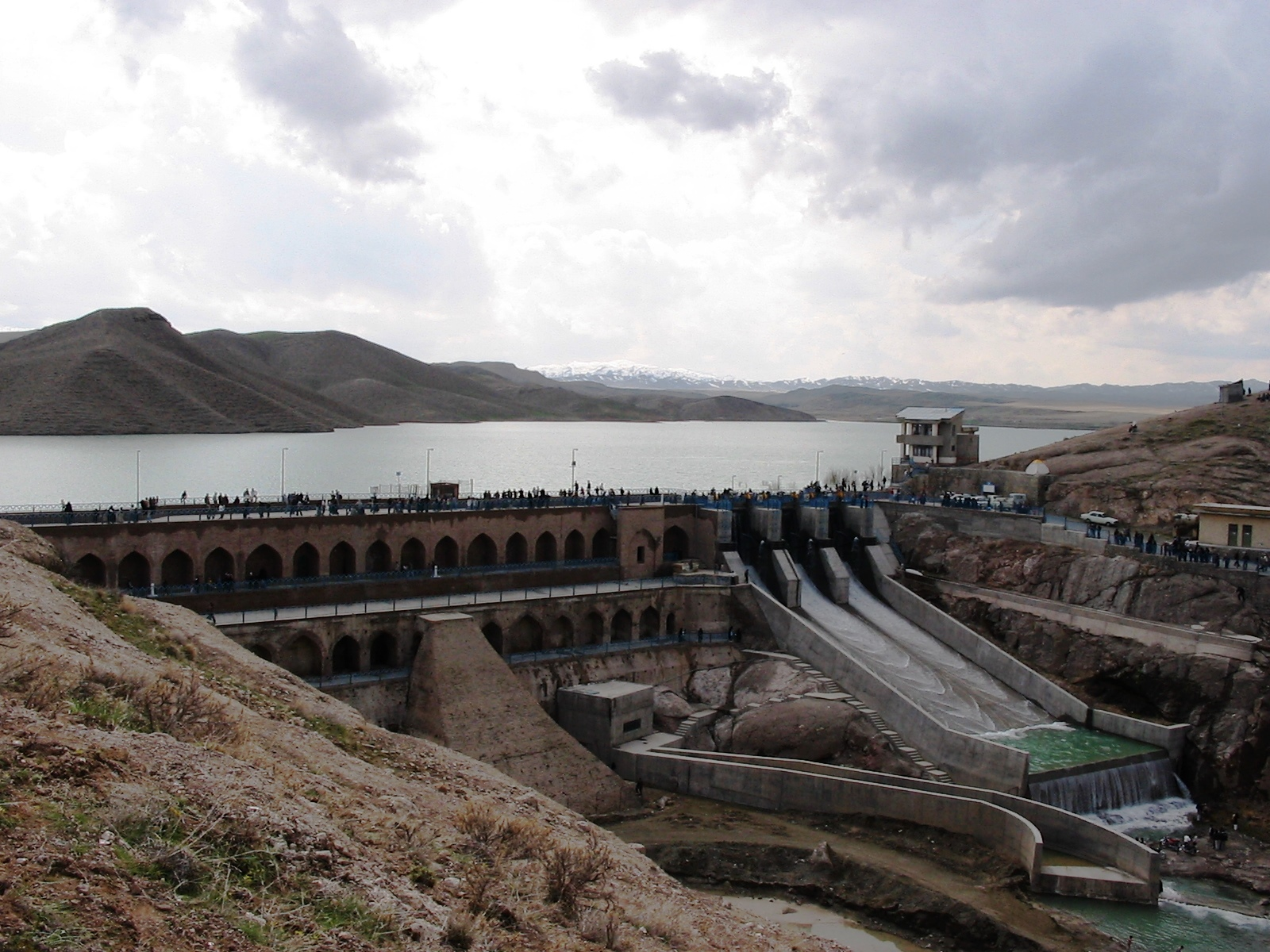
- Fariman's Dam possibly dates back to the reign of the Sassanid kings of Persia; it was rebuilt during the Timurid and the Qajar era in its current form

- Location within Iran
- Coordinates: 35°42′04″N 59°50′47″E
- Country: Iran
- Province: Razavi Khorasan
- County: Fariman
- District: Central

Population (2016 Census)
  - Total: 39,515
- Time zone: UTC+3:30 (IRST)

Fariman (Persian: فريمان) (Note: Also romanized as Farīmān; also known as Farīmūn) is a city in the Central District of Fariman County, Razavi Khorasan Province, Iran, serving as capital of both the county and the district.

== Demographics ==
=== Population ===
At the time of the 2006 National Census, the city's population was 32,610 in 8,203 households. The following census in 2011 counted 36,550 people in 10,254 households. The 2016 census measured the population of the city as 39,515 people in 11,755 households.

== Climate ==
Fariman has a cold semi-arid climate (BSk) according to the Köppen climate classification.

Climate data for Fariman(2006-2010 normals), elevation: 1,460.0 m (4,790.0 ft)
Month	Jan	Feb	Mar	Apr	May	Jun	Jul	Aug	Sep	Oct	Nov	Dec	Year
Mean daily maximum °C (°F)	4.1 (39.4)	7.9 (46.2)	15.6 (60.1)	19.4 (66.9)	25.5 (77.9)	29.5 (85.1)	30.8 (87.4)	29.8 (85.6)	25.9 (78.6)	21.7 (71.1)	14.2 (57.6)	7.4 (45.3)	19.3 (66.8)
Daily mean °C (°F)	−1.0 (30.2)	2.6 (36.7)	9.2 (48.6)	13.0 (55.4)	18.1 (64.6)	21.1 (70.0)	22.5 (72.5)	21.2 (70.2)	17.2 (63.0)	13.8 (56.8)	7.9 (46.2)	2.5 (36.5)	12.3 (54.2)
Mean daily minimum °C (°F)	−6.1 (21.0)	−2.7 (27.1)	2.8 (37.0)	6.6 (43.9)	10.6 (51.1)	12.8 (55.0)	14.1 (57.4)	12.7 (54.9)	8.5 (47.3)	5.8 (42.4)	1.5 (34.7)	−2.4 (27.7)	5.3 (41.6)
Average precipitation mm (inches)	25.9 (1.02)	37.7 (1.48)	60.2 (2.37)	47.3 (1.86)	33.4 (1.31)	3.6 (0.14)	0.1 (0.00)	0.4 (0.02)	1.6 (0.06)	2.8 (0.11)	15.1 (0.59)	20.2 (0.80)	248.3 (9.76)
Average relative humidity (%)	70	68	56	58	46	33	31	27	31	38	51	65	48
Source: Iran Meteorological Organization (temperatures), (humidity), (precipitation)

== Notable people ==
- Khodadad Azizi, born in Fariman; Iranian Football player
- Hassan Ghazizadeh Hashemi, born 21 March 1959 in Fariman; Minister of Health and Medical Education of President Hassan Rouhani
- Morteza Motahhari, 31 January 1919 in Fariman - 1 May 1979; an Iranian cleric, philosopher, lecturer, and politician
- Hadi Khorsandi, born 22 July 1943 (age 75) in Fariman; poet, and writer of Persian socio-political issues.

== See also ==
Media related to Fariman at Wikimedia Commons
