= Naqareh, Iran =

Village in Ardabil province, Iran

Naqareh Persian: نقاره
- Village
- Location within Iran
- Coordinates: 39°07′21″N 48°07′47″E
- Country: Iran
- Province: Ardabil
- County: Germi
- District: Central
- Rural District: Ojarud-e Shomali

Population (2016)
  - Total: 18
- Time zone: UTC+3:30 (IRST)

Naqareh (Persian: نقاره) (Note: Also romanized as Naqāreh and Noqāreh) is a village in Ojarud-e Shomali Rural District of the Central District in Germi County, (Note: Formerly Moghan County) Ardabil province, Iran.

== Demographics ==
=== Population ===
At the time of the 2006 National Census, the village's population was 158 in 26 households. The following census in 2011 counted 120 people in 26 households. The 2016 census measured the population of the village as 92 people in 26 households.
