= Qezel Guney =

Village in Ardabil province, Iran

Qezel Guney Persian: قزل گوني
- Village
- Location within Iran
- Coordinates: 39°04′59″N 48°07′27″E
- Country: Iran
- Province: Ardabil
- County: Germi
- District: Central
- Rural District: Ojarud-e Shomali

Population (2016)
  - Total: 29
- Time zone: UTC+3:30 (IRST)

Qezel Guney (Persian: قزل گوني) (Note: Also romanized as Qezel Gūney and Qezel Gūnī) is a village in Ojarud-e Shomali Rural District of the Central District in Germi County, (Note: Formerly Moghan County) Ardabil province, Iran.

== Demographics ==
=== Population ===
At the time of the 2006 National Census, the village's population was 65 in 10 households. The following census in 2011 counted 52 people in 11 households. The 2016 census measured the population of the village as 29 people in seven households.
