= Hachakand-e Tazeh =

Village in Ardabil province, Iran

Hachakand-e Tazeh Persian: هاچاكندتازه
- Village
- Location within Iran
- Coordinates: 39°04′41″N 48°04′52″E
- Country: Iran
- Province: Ardabil
- County: Germi
- District: Central
- Rural District: Ojarud-e Shomali

Population (2016)
  - Total: 200
- Time zone: UTC+3:30 (IRST)

Hachakand-e Tazeh (Persian: هاچاكندتازه) (Note: Also romanized as Hāchehkand-e Tāzeh; also known as Hāchā Kandī) is a village in Ojarud-e Shomali Rural District of the Central District in Germi County, (Note: Formerly Moghan County) Ardabil province, Iran.

== Demographics ==
=== Population ===
At the time of the 2006 National Census, the village's population was 355 in 64 households. The following census in 2011 counted 263 people in 69 households. The 2016 census measured the population of the village as 200 people in 58 households.
