= Saghirlu =

Village in Ardabil province, Iran

Saghirlu Persian: صغيرلر
- Village
- Location within Iran
- Coordinates: 39°04′40″N 48°07′25″E
- Country: Iran
- Province: Ardabil
- County: Germi
- District: Central
- Rural District: Ojarud-e Shomali

Population (2016)
  - Total: 46
- Time zone: UTC+3:30 (IRST)

Saghirlu (Persian: صغيرلر) (Note: Also romanized as Şaghīrlū; also known as Şagharlū) is a village in Ojarud-e Shomali Rural District of the Central District in Germi County, (Note: Formerly Moghan County) Ardabil province, Iran.

== Demographics ==
=== Population ===
At the time of the 2006 National Census, the village's population was 64 in 15 households. The following census in 2011 counted 58 people in 18 households. The 2016 census measured the population of the village as 46 people in 14 households.
