= Ojarud-e Shomali Rural District =

Rural district in Ardabil province, Iran

Ojarud-e Shomali Rural District Persian: دهستان اجارود شمالی
- Rural District
- Location within Iran
- Coordinates: 39°06′N 48°04′E
- Country: Iran
- Province: Ardabil
- County: Germi
- District: Central
- Established: 1992
- Capital: Shakar Ab

Population (2016)
  - Total: 2,832
- Time zone: UTC+3:30 (IRST)

Ojarud-e Shomali Rural District (Persian: دهستان اجارود شمالی) is in the Central District of Germi County, (Note: Formerly Moghan County) Ardabil province, Iran. Its capital is the village of Shakar Ab.

== Demographics ==
=== Population ===
At the time of the 2006 National Census, the rural district's population was 4,041 in 771 households. There were 3,528 inhabitants in 877 households at the following census of 2011. The 2016 census measured the population of the rural district as 2,832 in 802 households. The most populous of its 30 villages was Aranchi, with 514 people.

=== Other villages in the rural district ===
- Angurtlar-e Sofla
- Babi Kandi
- Beyk Baghi
- Chuneh Khanlu
- Edalat Qeshlaqi
- Farzi Kandi
- Hachakand-e Tazeh
- Havas Kandi
- Kachalar
- Kalleh Sar-e Olya
- Kalleh Sar-e Sofla
- Mashhadlu
- Najaf Qoli Qeshlaqi
- Naqareh
- Qater Yuran-e Olya
- Qater Yuran-e Sofla
- Qeshlaq-e Mazan-e Olya
- Qezel Guney
- Saghirlu
- Sari Nasirlu
- Sayadabad
- Seyyed Kandi
- Shekarlui-ye Olya
- Zareabad
