= Babi Kandi =

Village in Ardabil province, Iran

Babi Kandi Persian: بابي كندي
- Village
- Location within Iran
- Coordinates: 39°04′39″N 48°08′31″E
- Country: Iran
- Province: Ardabil
- County: Germi
- District: Central
- Rural District: Ojarud-e Shomali

Population (2016)
  - Total: 42
- Time zone: UTC+3:30 (IRST)

Babi Kandi (Persian: بابي كندي) (Note: Also romanized as Bābī Kandī; also known as Bā’ī Kandī) is a village in Ojarud-e Shomali Rural District of the Central District in Germi County, (Note: Formerly Moghan County) Ardabil province, Iran.

== Demographics ==
=== Population ===
At the time of the 2006 National Census, the village's population was 62 in 11 households. The following census in 2011 counted 47 people in 13 households. The 2016 census measured the population of the village as 42 people in 13 households.
