= Edalat Qeshlaqi =

Village in Ardabil province, Iran

Edalat Qeshlaqi Persian: عدالت قشلاقي
- Village
- Location within Iran
- Coordinates: 39°07′30″N 48°03′08″E
- Country: Iran
- Province: Ardabil
- County: Germi
- District: Central
- Rural District: Ojarud-e Shomali

Population (2016)
  - Total: 74
- Time zone: UTC+3:30 (IRST)

Edalat Qeshlaqi (Persian: عدالت قشلاقي) (Note: Also romanized as ‘Edālat Qeshlāqī; also known as Ḩājjī ‘Edālat) is a village in Ojarud-e Shomali Rural District of the Central District in Germi County, (Note: Formerly Moghan County) Ardabil province, Iran.

== Demographics ==
=== Population ===
At the time of the 2006 National Census, the village's population was 93 in 18 households. The following census in 2011 counted 91 people in 21 households. The 2016 census measured the population of the village as 74 people in 19 households.
