= Seyyed Kandi, Germi =

Village in Ardabil province, Iran

Seyyed Kandi Persian: سيدكندي
- Village
- Location within Iran
- Coordinates: 39°06′12″N 48°08′25″E
- Country: Iran
- Province: Ardabil
- County: Germi
- District: Central
- Rural District: Ojarud-e Shomali

Population (2016)
  - Total: 80
- Time zone: UTC+3:30 (IRST)

Seyyed Kandi (Persian: سيدكندي) (Note: Also romanized as Seyyed Kandī) is a village in Ojarud-e Shomali Rural District of the Central District in Germi County, (Note: Formerly Moghan County) Ardabil province, Iran.

== Demographics ==
=== Population ===
At the time of the 2006 National Census, the village's population was 175 in 37 households. The following census in 2011 counted 137 people in 34 households. The 2016 census measured the population of the village as 80 people in 26 households.
