= Shekarlui-ye Olya =

Village in Ardabil province, Iran

Shekarlui-ye Olya Persian: شكرلوي عليا
- Village
- Location within Iran
- Coordinates: 39°05′14″N 48°08′48″E
- Country: Iran
- Province: Ardabil
- County: Germi
- District: Central
- Rural District: Ojarud-e Shomali

Population (2016)
  - Total: 52
- Time zone: UTC+3:30 (IRST)

Shekarlui-ye Olya (Persian: شكرلوي عليا) (Note: Also romanized as Shekarlūī-ye ‘Olyā; also known as Shekarlū-ye Bālā, Shekarlū-ye ’Olyā, and Shokorlū-ye ‘Olyā) is a village in Ojarud-e Shomali Rural District of the Central District in Germi County, (Note: Formerly Moghan County) Ardabil province, Iran.

== Demographics ==
=== Population ===
At the time of the 2006 National Census, the village's population was 70 in 14 households. The following census in 2011 counted 51 people in 15 households. The 2016 census measured the population of the village as 52 people in 17 households.
