= Farzi Kandi =

Village in Ardabil province, Iran

Farzi Kandi Persian: فرضي كندي
- Village
- Location within Iran
- Coordinates: 39°06′45″N 48°01′02″E
- Country: Iran
- Province: Ardabil
- County: Germi
- District: Central
- Rural District: Ojarud-e Shomali

Population (2016)
  - Total: 21
- Time zone: UTC+3:30 (IRST)

Farzi Kandi (Persian: فرضي كندي) (Note: Also romanized as Farẕī Kandī; also known as Farẕī Qeshlāqī) is a village in Ojarud-e Shomali Rural District of the Central District in Germi County, (Note: Formerly Moghan County) Ardabil province, Iran.

== Demographics ==
=== Population ===
At the time of the 2006 National Census, the village's population was 17 in six households. The following census in 2011 counted 18 people in six households. The 2016 census measured the population of the village as 21 people in seven households.
