= Shakar Ab, Ardabil =

Village in Ardabil province, Iran

Shakar Ab Persian: شكراب
- Village
- Location within Iran
- Coordinates: 39°04′38″N 48°05′45″E
- Country: Iran
- Province: Ardabil
- County: Germi
- District: Central
- Rural District: Ojarud-e Shomali

Population (2016)
  - Total: 311
- Time zone: UTC+3:30 (IRST)

Shakar Ab (Persian: شكراب) (Note: Also romanized as Shakar Āb) is a village in, and the capital of, Ojarud-e Shomali Rural District in the Central District of Germi County, (Note: Formerly Moghan County) Ardabil province, Iran.

== Demographics ==
=== Population ===
At the time of the 2006 National Census, the village's population was 394 in 74 households. The following census in 2011 counted 350 people in 84 households. The 2016 census measured the population of the village as 311 people in 85 households.
