= Chuneh Khanlu =

Village in Ardabil province, Iran

Chuneh Khanlu Persian: چونه خانلو
- Village
- Location within Iran
- Coordinates: 39°06′40″N 48°08′33″E
- Country: Iran
- Province: Ardabil
- County: Germi
- District: Central
- Rural District: Ojarud-e Shomali

Population (2016)
  - Total: 157
- Time zone: UTC+3:30 (IRST)

Chuneh Khanlu (Persian: چونه خانلو) (Note: Also romanized as Chūneh Khānlū; also known as Chūn Khān and Chūnā Khānlū) is a village in Ojarud-e Shomali Rural District of the Central District in Germi County, (Note: Formerly Moghan County) Ardabil province, Iran.

== Demographics ==
=== Population ===
At the time of the 2006 National Census, the village's population was 216 in 43 households. The following census in 2011 counted 191 people in 48 households. The 2016 census measured the population of the village as 157 people in 46 households.
