= Najaf Qoli Qeshlaqi =

Village in Ardabil province, Iran

Najaf Qoli Qeshlaqi Persian: نجفقلي قشلاقي
- Village
- Location within Iran
- Coordinates: 39°06′57″N 48°03′06″E
- Country: Iran
- Province: Ardabil
- County: Germi
- District: Central
- Rural District: Ojarud-e Shomali

Population (2016)
  - Total: 303
- Time zone: UTC+3:30 (IRST)

Najaf Qoli Qeshlaqi (Persian: نجفقلي قشلاقي) (Note: Also romanized as Najaf Qolī Qeshlāqī; also known as Najaf ‘Alī Kandī and Najaf Qolī Kandī) is a village in Ojarud-e Shomali Rural District of the Central District in Germi County, (Note: Formerly Moghan County) Ardabil province, Iran.

== Demographics ==
=== Population ===
At the time of the 2006 National Census, the village's population was 348 in 61 households. The following census in 2011 counted 357 people in 95 households. The 2016 census measured the population of the village as 303 people in 87 households.
