= Beyk Baghi =

Village in Ardabil province, Iran

Beyk Baghi Persian: بيك باغي
- Village
- Location within Iran
- Coordinates: 39°04′12″N 48°06′32″E
- Country: Iran
- Province: Ardabil
- County: Germi
- District: Central
- Rural District: Ojarud-e Shomali

Population (2016)
  - Total: 62
- Time zone: UTC+3:30 (IRST)

Beyk Baghi (Persian: بيك باغي) (Note: Also romanized as Beik Baghi; also known as Bāi Bagh, Bāy Bāgh, Beg Bāgh, and Beyg Bāghī) is a village in Ojarud-e Shomali Rural District of the Central District in Germi County, (Note: Formerly Moghan County) Ardabil province, Iran.

== Demographics ==
=== Population ===
At the time of the 2006 National Census, the village's population was 122 in 25 households. The following census in 2011 counted 99 people in 23 households. The 2016 census measured the population of the village as 62 people in 18 households.
