= Lush Ab-e Qalandarabad =

Lush Ab-e Qalandarabad لوشاب قلندراباد
- Village
- Location within Iran
- Coordinates: 35°33′12″N 59°57′50″E
- Country: Iran
- Province: Razavi Khorasan
- County: Fariman
- Bakhsh: Qalandarabad
- Rural District: Qalandarabad

Population (2006)
  - Total: 102
- Time zone: UTC+3:30 (IRST)
  - Summer (DST): UTC+4:30 (IRDT)

Lush Ab-e Qalandarabad (Persian: لوشاب قلندراباد, also Romanized as Lūsh Āb-e Qalandarābād; also known as Lūsh Āb and Lūsh-e Qalandarābād) is a village in Qalandarabad Rural District, Qalandarabad District, Fariman County, Razavi Khorasan Province, Iran. At the 2006 census, its population was 102, in 26 families.
