= Mashhadlu =

Village in Ardabil province, Iran

Mashhadlu Persian: مشهدلو
- Village
- Location within Iran
- Coordinates: 39°03′54″N 48°07′05″E
- Country: Iran
- Province: Ardabil
- County: Germi
- District: Central
- Rural District: Ojarud-e Shomali

Population (2016)
  - Total: 42
- Time zone: UTC+3:30 (IRST)

Mashhadlu (Persian: مشهدلو) (Note: Also romanized as Mashhadlū) is a village in Ojarud-e Shomali Rural District of the Central District in Germi County, (Note: Formerly Moghan County) Ardabil province, Iran.

== Demographics ==
=== Population ===
At the time of the 2006 National Census, the village's population was 107 in 22 households. The following census in 2011 counted 81 people in 23 households. The 2016 census measured the population of the village as 42 people in 12 households.
