= Paul Havas =

American painter

- Born: Paul Havas; May 23, 1940; Orange, New Jersey
- Died: February 16, 2012 (aged 71); Seattle, Washington
- Spouse: Margaret Miller Havas

Paul Havas (May 23, 1940 − February 16, 2012) was an American painter. Havas is known for his landscape paintings.

== Education and teaching ==
Paul Havas was born in 1940 in Orange, New Jersey. He received a Bachelor of Fine Arts degree from Syracuse University in 1962 and went on to earn a master's degree from the University of Washington in 1965. He also studied at the Corcoran College of Art and Design and was a Max Beckmann fellow at the Brooklyn Museum School of Art. Havas went back to teach painting and drawing at the University of Washington, Idaho State University, and at Stanford University.

== Work ==
Grayland Light, 2010, by Paul Havas. Collection of Woodside/Braseth Gallery.

The subject of Havas' work changed throughout his life. In his early years, around 1970, while living on Capitol Hill in Seattle, Havas painted depictions of trucks. Later in his career, he painted landscapes using oil on canvas. Havas spent 14 years, from 1970 to 1984, living and painting on Fir Island, located in the Skagit Valley. The subject of the work he painted there was his surroundings: the farmlands of the Skagit Valley, the Cascades to the East, and the San Juan Islands to the West. His work in the Skagit Valley was influenced by his early training in abstract expressionism, and although he did not identify himself as an impressionist, he concentrated on light and how it fell across the subject of his work. Wesley Wehr described Havas's Skagit Valley landscapes as "filled with the diffuse light of spring and summer in the valley". Some of Havas' paintings from this time were a part of the Northwest/New York Group Show at the Bayard Gallery in New York in 1980 and can be found in the Museum of Northwest Art in La Conner, Washington.

Upon moving back to Seattle in 1984, Havas began painting night cityscapes and urban northwest landscapes. However, by 1993, around the time that he helped found the Northwest Figurative Artists' Alliance, he had resumed the creation of wilderness scenes, including both wide views and close-up depictions of specific elements of nature. Between these cityscapes and wilderness scenes, Havas began shifting the perspective of his paintings indoors. The viewer of the painting sees both a piece of the inside of the house and the view of the landscape or cityscape through a window. In a similar fashion, Havas also placed paintings within paintings, as seen in his work Piano and Painting, which features a painting of Lummi Island on the wall inside of a house. Lummi Island was a setting that Havas employed as he continued his work into the 2000s. His 2001 exhibition at the Woodside/Braseth Gallery, where his art was frequently displayed, included several paintings of Lummi Island. He continued his work near his summer home by the mouth of Willapa Bay, painting landscapes in and around Oysterville, WA in the CDP of Tokeland, WA.

== Death ==
Havas died at the age of 71 of pancreatic cancer on February 16, 2012.
