= Hoseynaliabad, Fars =

Hoseynaliabad حسين علي اباد
- Village
- Location within Iran
- Coordinates: 29°25′18″N 51°45′57″E
- Country: Iran
- Province: Fars
- County: Kazerun
- Bakhsh: Jereh and Baladeh
- Rural District: Dadin

Population (2006)
  - Total: 38
- Time zone: UTC+3:30 (IRST)
  - Summer (DST): UTC+4:30 (IRDT)

Hoseynaliabad (Persian: حسين علي اباد, also Romanized as Ḩoseyn‘alīābād) is a village in Dadin Rural District, Jereh and Baladeh District, Kazerun County, Fars province, Iran. At the 2006 census, its population consisted of 9 families with a total of 38 people.
