= Qater Yuran-e Olya =

Village in Ardabil province, Iran

Qater Yuran-e Olya Persian: قاطريوران عليا
- Village
- Location within Iran
- Coordinates: 39°09′52″N 48°02′58″E
- Country: Iran
- Province: Ardabil
- County: Germi
- District: Central
- Rural District: Ojarud-e Shomali

Population (2016)
  - Total: 94
- Time zone: UTC+3:30 (IRST)

Qater Yuran-e Olya (Persian: قاطريوران عليا) (Note: Also romanized as Qāţer Yūrān-e ‘Olyā; also known as Qāţer Yūrān-e Bālā, Sālār Qeshlaqī, and Yadī Qārdāsh (يدي قارداش)) is a village in Ojarud-e Shomali Rural District of the Central District in Germi County, (Note: Formerly Moghan County) Ardabil province, Iran.

== Demographics ==
=== Population ===
At the time of the 2006 National Census, the village's population was 53 in nine households. The following census in 2011 counted 94 people in 24 households. The 2016 census measured the population of the village as 94 people in 26 households.
