= Hoseyn Aliabad, Lorestan =

Hoseyn Aliabad حسين علي اباد
- Village
- Location within Iran
- Coordinates: 34°17′58″N 47°46′04″E
- Country: Iran
- Province: Lorestan
- County: Delfan
- Bakhsh: Kakavand
- Rural District: Kakavand-e Sharqi

Population (2006)
  - Total: 25
- Time zone: UTC+3:30 (IRST)
  - Summer (DST): UTC+4:30 (IRDT)

Hoseyn Aliabad (Persian: حسين علي اباد, also Romanized as Ḩoseyn ‘Alīābād; also known as Ḩoseynkhān) is a village in Kakavand-e Sharqi Rural District, Kakavand District, Delfan County, Lorestan Province, Iran. At the 2006 census, its population was 25, in 6 families.
