= Qater Yuran-e Sofla =

Village in Ardabil province, Iran

Qater Yuran-e Sofla Persian: قاطريوران سفلي
- Village
- Location within Iran
- Coordinates: 39°08′23″N 48°01′49″E
- Country: Iran
- Province: Ardabil
- County: Germi
- District: Central
- Rural District: Ojarud-e Shomali

Population (2016)
  - Total: 38
- Time zone: UTC+3:30 (IRST)

Qater Yuran-e Sofla (Persian: قاطريوران سفلي) (Note: Also romanized as Qāţer Yūrān-e Soflá; also known as Haft Barādar) is a village in Ojarud-e Shomali Rural District of the Central District in Germi County, (Note: Formerly Moghan County) Ardabil province, Iran.

== Demographics ==
=== Population ===
At the time of the 2006 National Census, the village's population was 90 in 21 households. The following census in 2011 counted 43 people in nine households. The 2016 census measured the population of the village as 38 people in nine households.
