= Zareabad, Ardabil =

Village in Ardabil province, Iran

Zareabad Persian: زارع اباد
- Village
- Location within Iran
- Country: Iran
- Province: Ardabil
- County: Germi
- District: Central
- Rural District: Ojarud-e Shomali

Population (2016)
  - Total: 73
- Time zone: UTC+3:30 (IRST)

Zareabad (Persian: زارع اباد) (Note: Also romanized as Zāre‘ābād; also known as Ja‘farābād) is a village in Ojarud-e Shomali Rural District of the Central District in Germi County, (Note: Formerly Moghan County) Ardabil province, Iran.

== Demographics ==
=== Population ===
At the time of the 2006 National Census, the village's population was 119 in 24 households, when it was in Angut-e Sharqi Rural District of Ungut District. (Note: Renamed the Central District of Ungut County) The following census in 2011 counted 66 people in 17 households. The 2016 census measured the population of the village as 73 people in 22 households.

In 2019, the district was separated from the county in the establishment of Ungut County and renamed the Central District. Zareabad was transferred to Ojarud-e Shomali Rural District of the Central District in Germi County.
