= Angurtlar-e Sofla =

Village in Ardabil province, Iran

Angurtlar-e Sofla Persian: انگورتلارسفلي
- Village
- Location within Iran
- Coordinates: 39°09′52″N 48°04′06″E
- Country: Iran
- Province: Ardabil
- County: Germi
- District: Central
- Rural District: Ojarud-e Shomali

Population (2016)
  - Total: 190
- Time zone: UTC+3:30 (IRST)

Angurtlar-e Sofla (Persian: انگورتلارسفلي) (Note: Also romanized as Angūrtlār-e Soflá; also known as Azhdarlu (اژدرلو), also romanized as Azhdarlū) is a village in Ojarud-e Shomali Rural District of the Central District in Germi County, (Note: Formerly Moghan County) Ardabil province, Iran.

== Demographics ==
=== Population ===
At the time of the 2006 National Census, the village's population was 305 in 63 households. The following census in 2011 counted 272 people in 69 households. The 2016 census measured the population of the village as 190 people in 51 households.
