= Aranchi =

Village in Ardabil province, Iran

Aranchi Persian: ارانچي
- Village
- Location within Iran
- Coordinates: 39°03′58″N 48°04′35″E
- Country: Iran
- Province: Ardabil
- County: Germi
- District: Central
- Rural District: Ojarud-e Shomali

Population (2016)
  - Total: 514
- Time zone: UTC+3:30 (IRST)

Aranchi (Persian: ارانچي) (Note: Also romanized as Arānchī) is a village in Ojarud-e Shomali Rural District of the Central District in Germi County, (Note: Formerly Moghan County) Ardabil province, Iran.

== Demographics ==
=== Population ===
At the time of the 2006 National Census, the village's population was 604 in 123 households. The following census in 2011 counted 592 people in 149 households. The 2016 census measured the population of the village as 514 people in 151 households. It was the most populous village in its rural district.
