= Kalleh Sar, Qazvin =

Kalleh Sar كله سر
- Village
- Location within Iran
- Coordinates: 35°47′08″N 48°53′42″E
- Country: Iran
- Province: Qazvin
- County: Avaj
- Bakhsh: Central District
- Rural District: Hesar-e Valiyeasr

Population (2006)
  - Total: 43
- Time zone: UTC+3:30 (IRST)

Kalleh Sar (Persian: كله سر, also Romanized as Kolah Sar) is a village in Hesar-e Valiyeasr Rural District, Central District, Avaj County, Qazvin Province, Iran. At the 2006 census, its population was 43, in 10 families.
