= Qeshlaq-e Mazan-e Olya =

Village in Ardabil province, Iran

Qeshlaq-e Mazan-e Olya Persian: قشلاق مازان عليا
- Village
- Location within Iran
- Country: Iran
- Province: Ardabil
- County: Germi
- District: Central
- Rural District: Ojarud-e Shomali

Population (2016)
  - Total: 39
- Time zone: UTC+3:30 (IRST)

Qeshlaq-e Mazan-e Olya (Persian: قشلاق مازان عليا) (Note: Also romanized as Qeshlāq-e Māzān-e ‘Olyā; also known as Kalleh Sar and Māzān-e Bālā) is a village in Ojarud-e Shomali Rural District of the Central District in Germi County, (Note: Formerly Moghan County) Ardabil province, Iran.

== Demographics ==
=== Population ===
At the time of the 2006 National Census, the village's population was 64 in 13 households. The following census in 2011 counted 62 people in 14 households. The 2016 census measured the population of the village as 39 people in 11 households.
