= Peyvand-e Olya =

Peyvand-e Olya پيوندعليا
- Village
- Location within Iran
- Coordinates: 32°39′40″N 59°35′53″E
- Country: Iran
- Province: South Khorasan
- County: Sarbisheh
- Bakhsh: Mud
- Rural District: Mud

Population (2006)
  - Total: 72
- Time zone: UTC+3:30 (IRST)
  - Summer (DST): UTC+4:30 (IRDT)

Peyvand-e Olya (Persian: پيوندعليا, also Romanized as Peyvand-e ‘Olyā; also known as Peyvand-e Bālā, Paiwand, and Peyvand Bālā) is a village in Mud Rural District, Mud District, Sarbisheh County, South Khorasan Province, Iran. At the 2006 census, its population was 72, in 17 families.
