= Sari Nasirlu =

Village in Ardabil province, Iran

Sari Nasirlu Persian: ساري نصيرلو
- Village
- Location within Iran
- Coordinates: 39°08′02″N 48°03′34″E
- Country: Iran
- Province: Ardabil
- County: Germi
- District: Central
- Rural District: Ojarud-e Shomali

Population (2016)
  - Total: 203
- Time zone: UTC+3:30 (IRST)

Sari Nasirlu (Persian: ساري نصيرلو) (Note: Also romanized as Sārī Naşīrlū; also known as Āngūrtlār-e ‘Olyā) is a village in Ojarud-e Shomali Rural District of the Central District in Germi County, (Note: Formerly Moghan County) Ardabil province, Iran.

== Demographics ==
=== Population ===
At the time of the 2006 National Census, the village's population was 264 in 40 households. The following census in 2011 counted 244 people in 48 households. The 2016 census measured the population of the village as 203 people in 50 households.
