= Kalleh Sar-e Sofla =

Village in Ardabil province, Iran

Kalleh Sar-e Sofla Persian: كله سرسفلي
- Village
- Location within Iran
- Coordinates: 39°09′37″N 48°07′21″E
- Country: Iran
- Province: Ardabil
- County: Germi
- District: Central
- Rural District: Ojarud-e Shomali

Population (2016)
  - Total: 59
- Time zone: UTC+3:30 (IRST)

Kalleh Sar-e Sofla (Persian: كله سرسفلي) (Note: Also romanized as Kalleh Sar-e Soflá; also known as Kalleh Sar-e Pā’īn) is a village in Ojarud-e Shomali Rural District of the Central District in Germi County, (Note: Formerly Moghan County) Ardabil province, Iran.

== Demographics ==
=== Population ===
At the time of the 2006 National Census, the village's population was 89 in 15 households. The following census in 2011 counted 75 people in 21 households. The 2016 census measured the population of the village as 59 people in 18 households.
