= Kalleh Sar-e Olya =

Village in Ardabil province, Iran

Kalleh Sar-e Olya Persian: كله سرعليا
- Village
- Location within Iran
- Country: Iran
- Province: Ardabil
- County: Germi
- District: Central
- Rural District: Ojarud-e Shomali

Population (2016)
  - Total: 18
- Time zone: UTC+3:30 (IRST)

Kalleh Sar-e Olya (Persian: كله سرعليا) (Note: Also romanized as Kalleh Sar-e ‘Olyā; also known as Kalleh Sar and Kalleh Sar-e Bālā) is a village in Ojarud-e Shomali Rural District of the Central District in Germi County, (Note: Formerly Moghan County) Ardabil province, Iran.

== Demographics ==
=== Population ===
At the time of the 2006 National Census, the village's population was 45 in eight households. The following census in 2011 counted 17 people in seven households. The 2016 census measured the population of the village as 18 people in six households.
