= Havas Kandi =

Village in Ardabil province, Iran

Havas Kandi Persian: حواس كندي
- Village
- Location within Iran
- Coordinates: 39°08′45″N 48°10′15″E
- Country: Iran
- Province: Ardabil
- County: Germi
- District: Central
- Rural District: Ojarud-e Shomali

Population (2016)
  - Total: 91
- Time zone: UTC+3:30 (IRST)

Havas Kandi (Persian: حواس كندي) (Note: Also romanized as Ḩavās Kandī; also known as Havās) is a village in Ojarud-e Shomali Rural District of the Central District in Germi County, (Note: Formerly Moghan County) Ardabil province, Iran.

== Demographics ==
=== Population ===
At the time of the 2006 National Census, the village's population was 185 in 32 households. The following census in 2011 counted 129 people in 25 households. The 2016 census measured the population of the village as 91 people in 23 households.
