= Pol Havas =

Pol Havas پل هواس
- Village
- Location within Iran
- Coordinates: 34°31′17″N 46°31′10″E
- Country: Iran
- Province: Kermanshah
- County: Kermanshah
- Bakhsh: Kuzaran
- Rural District: Sanjabi

Population (2006)
  - Total: 117
- Time zone: UTC+3:30 (IRST)
  - Summer (DST): UTC+4:30 (IRDT)

Pol Havas (Persian: پل هواس, also Romanized as Pol Havās and Pel Havās; also known as Bolhavāz) is a village in Sanjabi Rural District, Kuzaran District, Kermanshah County, Kermanshah Province, Iran. At the 2006 census, its population was 117, in 25 families.
