= Fariman Rural District =

Rural district in Razavi Khorasan province, Iran

Fariman Rural District Persian: دهستان فريمان
- Rural District
- Location within Iran
- Coordinates: 35°46′N 59°48′E
- Country: Iran
- Province: Razavi Khorasan
- County: Fariman
- District: Central
- Established: 1986
- Capital: Farhadgerd

Population (2016)
  - Total: 10,738
- Time zone: UTC+3:30 (IRST)

Fariman Rural District (Persian: دهستان فريمان) is in the Central District of Fariman County, Razavi Khorasan province, Iran. It is administered from the city of Farhadgerd.

== Demographics ==
=== Population ===
At the time of the 2006 National Census, the rural district's population was 9,351 in 2,178 households. There were 10,220 inhabitants in 2,703 households at the following census of 2011. The 2016 census measured the population of the rural district as 10,738 in 3,024 households. The most populous of its 31 villages was Qaleh Now-ye Fariman, with 3,722 people.

=== Other villages in the rural district ===
- Aqar-e Olya
- Eshqabad
- Feyzabad
- Gandeh Cheshmeh
- Havas
- Lushab-e Fariman
- Sang-e Atash
