= Sang Bast Rural District =

Rural district in Razavi Khorasan province, Iran

Sang Bast Rural District Persian: دهستان سنگ بست
- Rural District
- Location within Iran
- Coordinates: 35°52′N 59°40′E
- Country: Iran
- Province: Razavi Khorasan
- County: Fariman
- District: Central
- Established: 1986
- Capital: Sang Bast

Population (2016)
  - Total: 7,027
- Time zone: UTC+3:30 (IRST)

Sang Bast Rural District (Persian: دهستان سنگ بست) is in the Central District of Fariman County, Razavi Khorasan province, Iran. Its capital is the village of Sang Bast.

== Demographics ==
=== Population ===
At the time of the 2006 National Census, the rural district's population was 6,612 in 1,785 households. There were 6,884 inhabitants in 2,028 households at the following census of 2011. The 2016 census measured the population of the rural district as 7,027 in 2,160 households. The most populous of its 51 villages was Sadabad, with 1,157 people.

=== Other villages in the rural district ===
- Ahmadabad
- Bagh-e Salar
- Bozjani
- Cheram
- Hedayatabad
- Karizmeh
- Maragheh
- Musaabad
