= Balaband Rural District =

Rural district in Razavi Khorasan province, Iran

Balaband Rural District Persian: دهستان بالابند
- Rural District
- Location within Iran
- Coordinates: 35°35′N 59°39′E
- Country: Iran
- Province: Razavi Khorasan
- County: Fariman
- District: Central
- Established: 1986
- Capital: Zarkak

Population (2016)
  - Total: 7,918
- Time zone: UTC+3:30 (IRST)

Balaband Rural District (Persian: دهستان بالابند) is in the Central District of Fariman County, Razavi Khorasan province, Iran. Its capital is the village of Zarkak.

== Demographics ==
=== Population ===
At the time of the 2006 National Census, the rural district's population was 8,501 in 1,909 households. There were 8,868 inhabitants in 2,330 households at the following census of 2011. The 2016 census measured the population of the rural district as 7,918 in 2,203 households. The most populous of its 46 villages was Chahar Bast Bagh, with 979 people.

=== Other villages in the rural district ===
- Altatu
- Aq Kamar-e Sofla
- Bagh Abbas
- Hasanabad-e Sufi
- Maghu
- Miandehi
- Nari
- Qaleh Sangi
- Sar Dasht
