= Central District (Fariman County) =

District in Razavi Khorasan province, Iran

Central District (Fariman County) Persian: بخش مرکزی شهرستان فریمان
- District
- Location within Iran
- Coordinates: 35°44′N 59°45′E
- Country: Iran
- Province: Razavi Khorasan
- County: Fariman
- Established: 1993
- Capital: Fariman

Population (2016)
  - Total: 73,640
- Time zone: UTC+3:30 (IRST)

The Central District of Fariman County (Persian: بخش مرکزی شهرستان فریمان) is in Razavi Khorasan province, Iran. Its capital is the city of Fariman.

== Demographics ==
=== Population ===
At the time of the 2006 National Census, the district's population was 63,694 in 15,682 households. The following census in 2011 counted 70,169 people in 19,383 households. The 2016 census measured the population of the district as 73,640 inhabitants in 21,522 households.

=== Administrative divisions ===
Central District (Fariman County) Population
Administrative Divisions	2006	2011	2016
Balaband RD	8,501	8,868	7,918
Fariman RD	9,351	10,220	10,738
Sang Bast RD	6,612	6,884	7,027
Farhadgerd (city)	6,620	7,647	8,442
Fariman (city)	32,610	36,550	39,515
Total	63,694	70,169	73,640
RD = Rural District
