= Fariman County =

County in Razavi Khorasan Province, Iran

Fariman County Persian: شهرستان فریمان
- County
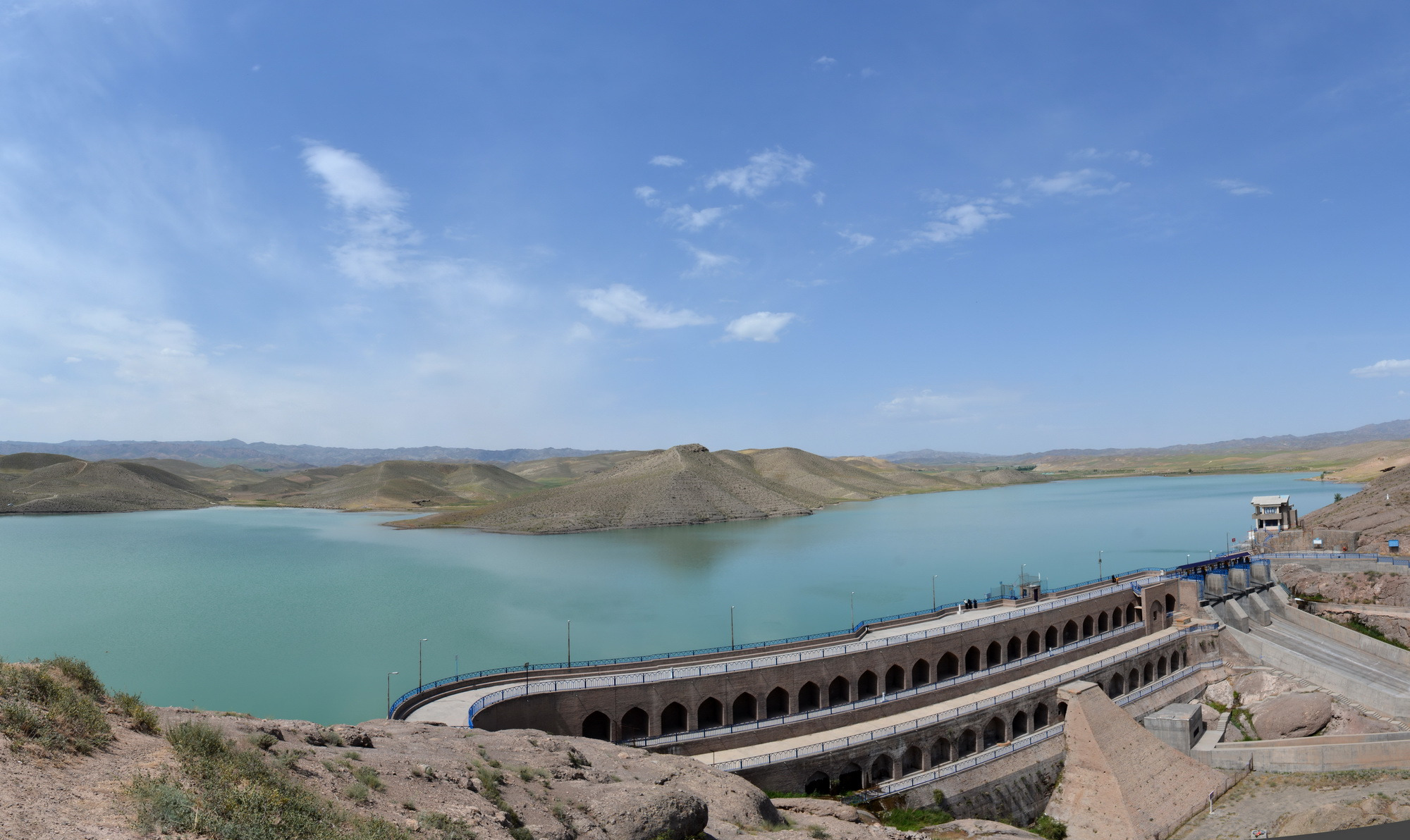
- Fariman Dam

- Location of Fariman County in Razavi Khorasan province (center right, yellow)

- Location of Razavi Khorasan province in Iran
- Coordinates: 35°44′N 60°01′E
- Country: Iran
- Province: Razavi Khorasan
- Established: 1993
- Capital: Fariman
- Districts: Central, Qalandarabad

Area
  - Total: 3,356 km^{2} (1,296 sq mi)

Population (2016)
  - Total: 99,001
  - Density: 29.50/km^{2} (76.40/sq mi)
- Time zone: UTC+3:30 (IRST)

Fariman County (Persian: شهرستان فریمان) is in Razavi Khorasan Province, Iran. Its capital is the city of Fariman.

== Demographics ==
=== Population ===
At the time of the 2006 National Census, the county's population was 86,428 in 20,925 households. The following census in 2011 counted 93,930 people in 25,686 households. The 2016 census measured the population of the county as 99,001 in 28,641 households.

=== Administrative divisions ===
Fariman County's population history and administrative structure over three consecutive censuses are shown in the following table.

Fariman County Population
Administrative Divisions	2006	2011	2016
Central District	63,694	70,169	73,640
Balaband RD	8,501	8,868	7,918
Fariman RD	9,351	10,220	10,738
Sang Bast RD	6,612	6,884	7,027
Farhadgerd (city)	6,620	7,647	8,442
Fariman (city)	32,610	36,550	39,515
Qalandarabad District	22,734	23,761	25,361
Qalandarabad RD	10,243	10,334	11,079
Sefid Sang RD	2,725	2,958	3,273
Qalandarabad (city)	4,872	4,924	4,880
Sefid Sang (city)	4,894	5,545	6,129
Total	86,428	93,930	99,001
RD = Rural District

== See also ==
Media related to Fariman County at Wikimedia Commons
