= Ahad Beyglu =

Village in Ardabil province, Iran

Ahad Beyglu Persian: احدبيگلو
- Village
- Location within Iran
- Coordinates: 38°59′22″N 47°51′16″E
- Country: Iran
- Province: Ardabil
- County: Ungut
- District: Central
- Rural District: Angut-e Sharqi

Population (2016)
  - Total: 23
- Time zone: UTC+3:30 (IRST)

Ahad Beyglu (Persian: احدبيگلو) (Note: Also romanized as Aḩad Beyglū) is a village in Angut-e Sharqi Rural District of the Central District in Ungut County, Ardabil province, Iran.

== Demographics ==
=== Population ===
At the time of the 2006 National Census, the village's population was 21 in four households, when it was in Pain Barzand Rural District of Ungut District in Germi County. (Note: Renamed the Central District of Ungut County) in Germi County. (Note: Formerly Moghan County) The following census in 2011 counted 24 people in seven households. The 2016 census measured the population of the village as 23 people in 10 households.

In 2019, the rural district was transferred to the Central District of Germi County. The district was transferred to the newly established Ungut County and renamed the Central District. Ahad Beyglu was transferred to Angut-e Sharqi Rural District in the same district.
