= Hoseyn Khanlu =

Village in Ardabil province, Iran

Hoseyn Khanlu Persian: حسين خانلو
- Village
- Location within Iran
- Coordinates: 38°58′13″N 47°51′18″E
- Country: Iran
- Province: Ardabil
- County: Ungut
- District: Central
- Rural District: Angut-e Sharqi

Population (2016)
  - Total: 23
- Time zone: UTC+3:30 (IRST)

Hoseyn Khanlu (Persian: حسين خانلو) (Note: Also romanized as Ḩoseyn Khānlū) is a village in Angut-e Sharqi Rural District of the Central District in Ungut County, Ardabil province, Iran.

== Demographics ==
=== Population ===
At the time of the 2006 National Census, the village's population was 40 in six households, when it was in Pain Barzand Rural District of Ungut District in Germi County. (Note: Renamed the Central District of Ungut County) in Germi County. (Note: Formerly Moghan County) The following census in 2011 counted 35 people in seven households. The 2016 census measured the population of the village as 23 people in eight households. The 2016 census measured the population of the village as 23 people in 10 households.

In 2019, the rural district was transferred to the Central District of Germi County. The district was transferred to the newly established Ungut County and renamed the Central District. Hoseyn Khanlu was transferred to Angut-e Sharqi Rural District in the same district.
