= Dash Bolagh-e Barzand =

Village in Ardabil province, Iran

Dash Bolagh-e Barzand Persian: داشبلاغ برزند
- Village
- Location within Iran
- Coordinates: 38°59′36″N 47°50′23″E
- Country: Iran
- Province: Ardabil
- County: Ungut
- District: Central
- Rural District: Angut-e Sharqi

Population (2016)
  - Total: Below reporting threshold
- Time zone: UTC+3:30 (IRST)

Dash Bolagh-e Barzand (Persian: داشبلاغ برزند) (Note: Also romanized as Dāsh Bolāgh-e Barzand; also known as Dāsh Bolāgh) is a village in Angut-e Sharqi Rural District of the Central District in Ungut County, Ardabil province, Iran.

== Demographics ==
=== Population ===
At the time of the 2006 National Census, the village's population was 18 in four households, when it was in Pain Barzand Rural District of Ungut District in Germi County. (Note: Renamed the Central District of Ungut County) in Germi County. (Note: Formerly Moghan County) The following census in 2011 counted a population below the reporting threshold. The 2016 census again measured the population of the village as below the reporting threshold. The 2016 census measured the population of the village as 23 people in 10 households.

In 2019, the rural district was transferred to the Central District of Germi County. The district was transferred to the newly established Ungut County and renamed the Central District. Dash Bolagh-e Barzand was transferred to Angut-e Sharqi Rural District in the same district.
