= Qatar (disambiguation) =

Qatar is a country in the West Asia.

Qatar may also refer to:

- Qatar, East Azerbaijan, Iran
- Qatar, West Azerbaijan, Iran
- Qatar Airways, the state-owned flag carrier of Qatar
- Qatar SC, a sports club based in Doha, Qatar

== See also ==
- Catarrh (disambiguation)
- Katar (disambiguation)
- Qatar-e Olya, Ardabil Province, Iran
- Qatar-e Sofla, Ardabil Province, Iran
