= Hadilu =

Village in Ardabil province, Iran

Hadilu Persian: هديلو
- Village
- Location within Iran
- Coordinates: 39°01′49″N 47°45′03″E
- Country: Iran
- Province: Ardabil
- County: Ungut
- District: Central
- Rural District: Angut-e Sharqi

Population (2016)
  - Total: 247
- Time zone: UTC+3:30 (IRST)

Hadilu (Persian: هديلو) (Note: Also romanized as Hādīlū and Hadīlū) is a village in Angut-e Sharqi Rural District of the Central District (Note: Formerly Ungut District of Germi County) in Ungut County, Ardabil province, Iran.

== Demographics ==
=== Population ===
At the time of the 2006 National Census, the village's population was 298 in 61 households, when it was in Ungut District (Note: Renamed the Central District of Ungut County) of Germi County. (Note: Formerly Moghan County) The following census in 2011 counted 252 people in 57 households. The 2016 census measured the population of the village as 247 people in 75 households. The 2016 census measured the population of the village as 23 people in 10 households.

In 2019, the rural district was transferred to the Central District of Germi County. The district was transferred to the newly established Ungut County and renamed the Central District. Ahad Beyglu was transferred to Angut-e Sharqi Rural District in the same district.
