= Germi (disambiguation) =

Germi is a city in Ardabil Province, Iran.

Germi or Garmi (Persian: گرمي) may also refer to:

- Garmi Angut, Ardabil Province
- Garmi, Kerman
- Garmi, Kermanshah
- Germi County, in Ardabil Province
