= Marallui-ye Kalbalu =

Village in Ardabil province, Iran

Marallui-ye Kalbalu Persian: ماراللوي كلبلو
- Village
- Location within Iran
- Coordinates: 38°57′19″N 47°50′55″E
- Country: Iran
- Province: Ardabil
- County: Ungut
- District: Central
- Rural District: Angut-e Sharqi

Population (2016)
  - Total: 96
- Time zone: UTC+3:30 (IRST)

Marallui-ye Kalbalu (Persian: ماراللوي كلبلو) (Note: Also romanized as Mārāllūī-ye Kalbalū; also known as Marāllū and Mārāllū-ye Kalbalū) is a village in Angut-e Sharqi Rural District of the Central District in Ungut County, Ardabil province, Iran.

== Demographics ==
=== Population ===
At the time of the 2006 National Census, the village's population was 110 in 20 households, when it was in Pain Barzand Rural District of Ungut District in Germi County. (Note: Renamed the Central District of Ungut County) in Germi County. (Note: Formerly Moghan County) The following census in 2011 counted 86 people in 26 households. The 2016 census measured the population of the village as 96 people in 33 households. The 2016 census measured the population of the village as 23 people in 10 households.

In 2019, the rural district was transferred to the Central District of Germi County. The district was transferred to the newly established Ungut County and renamed the Central District. Marallui-ye Kalbalu was transferred to Angut-e Sharqi Rural District in the same district.
