= Yelsui =

Village in Ardabil province, Iran

Yelsui Persian: يل سويي
- Village
- Location within Iran
- Coordinates: 39°00′31″N 47°46′03″E
- Country: Iran
- Province: Ardabil
- County: Ungut
- District: Central
- Rural District: Angut-e Sharqi

Population (2016)
  - Total: 229
- Time zone: UTC+3:30 (IRST)

Yelsui (Persian: يل سويي) (Note: Also romanized as Yelsū’ī) is a village in Angut-e Sharqi Rural District of the Central District (Note: Formerly Ungut District of Germi County) in Ungut County, Ardabil province, Iran.

== Demographics ==
=== Population ===
At the time of the 2006 National Census, the village's population was 270 in 60 households, when it was in Ungut District (Note: Renamed the Central District of Ungut County) of Germi County. (Note: Formerly Moghan County) The following census in 2011 counted 243 people in 64 households. The 2016 census measured the population of the village as 229 people in 69 households.

In 2019, the district was separated from the county in the establishment of Ungut County and renamed the Central District.
