= Qaleh Barzand =

Village in Ardabil province, Iran

Qaleh Barzand Persian: قلعه برزند
- Village
- Location within Iran
- Coordinates: 39°00′10″N 47°54′56″E
- Country: Iran
- Province: Ardabil
- County: Germi
- District: Central
- Rural District: Pain Barzand

Population (2016)
  - Total: 92
- Time zone: UTC+3:30 (IRST)

Qaleh Barzand (Persian: قلعه برزند) (Note: Also romanized as Qal‘eh Barzand) is a village in Pain Barzand Rural District of the Central District in Germi County, (Note: Formerly Moghan County) Ardabil province, Iran.

== Demographics ==
=== Population ===
At the time of the 2006 National Census, the village's population was 146 in 37 households, when it was in Ungut District. (Note: Renamed the Central District of Ungut County) The following census in 2011 counted 143 people in 35 households. The 2016 census measured the population of the village as 92 people in 29 households.

In 2019, the rural district was transferred to the Central District.
