= Tusanlui-ye Barzand =

Village in Ardabil province, Iran

Tusanlui-ye Barzand Persian: توسانلوي برزند
- Village
- Location within Iran
- Coordinates: 38°58′33″N 47°53′54″E
- Country: Iran
- Province: Ardabil
- County: Germi
- District: Central
- Rural District: Pain Barzand

Population (2016)
  - Total: 212
- Time zone: UTC+3:30 (IRST)

Tusanlui-ye Barzand (Persian: توسانلوي برزند) (Note: Also romanized as Tūsānlūī-ye Barzand; also known as Tūsanlū and Tūsānlū-ye Barzand) is a village in Pain Barzand Rural District of the Central District in Germi County, (Note: Formerly Moghan County) Ardabil province, Iran.

== Demographics ==
=== Population ===
At the time of the 2006 National Census, the village's population was 253 in 48 households, when it was in Ungut District. (Note: Renamed the Central District of Ungut County) The following census in 2011 counted 219 people in 56 households. The 2016 census measured the population of the village as 212 people in 65 households.

In 2019, the rural district was transferred to the Central District.
