= Tavus Darrehsi =

Village in Ardabil province, Iran

Tavus Darrehsi Persian: طاوس دره سي
- Village
- Location within Iran
- Coordinates: 38°52′11″N 47°50′32″E
- Country: Iran
- Province: Ardabil
- County: Germi
- District: Central
- Rural District: Pain Barzand

Population (2016)
  - Total: 60
- Time zone: UTC+3:30 (IRST)

Tavus Darrehsi (Persian: طاوس دره سي) (Note: Also romanized as Ţāvūs Darrehsī; also known as Ţāvos Darrehsī) is a village in Pain Barzand Rural District of the Central District in Germi County, (Note: Formerly Moghan County) Ardabil province, Iran.

== Demographics ==
=== Population ===
At the time of the 2006 National Census, the village's population was 175 in 35 households, when it was in Ungut District. (Note: Renamed the Central District of Ungut County) The following census in 2011 counted 122 people in 30 households. The 2016 census measured the population of the village as 60 people in 18 households.

In 2019, the rural district was transferred to the Central District.
