= Dash Qapu =

Village in Ardabil province, Iran

Dash Qapu Persian: داشقاپو
- Village
- Location within Iran
- Coordinates: 39°03′37″N 47°43′58″E
- Country: Iran
- Province: Ardabil
- County: Ungut
- District: Central
- Rural District: Angut-e Sharqi

Population (2016)
  - Total: 141
- Time zone: UTC+3:30 (IRST)

Dash Qapu (Persian: داشقاپو) (Note: Also romanized as Dāsh Qāpū) is a village in Angut-e Sharqi Rural District of the Central District (Note: Formerly Ungut District of Germi County) in Ungut County, Ardabil province, Iran.

== Demographics ==
=== Population ===
At the time of the 2006 National Census, the village's population was 167 in 32 households, when it was in Ungut District (Note: Renamed the Central District of Ungut County) of Germi County. (Note: Formerly Moghan County) The following census in 2011 counted 165 people in 37 households. The 2016 census measured the population of the village as 141 people in 37 households. The 2016 census measured the population of the village as 23 people in 10 households.

In 2019, the rural district was transferred to the Central District of Germi County. The district was transferred to the newly established Ungut County and renamed the Central District. Ahad Beyglu was transferred to Angut-e Sharqi Rural District in the same district.
