= Shur Daraq =

Shur Daraq (Persian: شوردرق), also rendered as Shordere or Shur Darreh, may refer to various places in Iran:

- Shur Daraq-e Olya, Ardabil Province
- Shur Daraq-e Sofla, Ardabil Province
- Shur Daraq, Hashtrud, East Azerbaijan Province
- Shur Daraq, Marand, East Azerbaijan Province
