= Tapalqa =

Village in Ardabil province, Iran

Tapalqa Persian: تپلقا
- Village
- Location within Iran
- Coordinates: 39°10′31″N 47°49′29″E
- Country: Iran
- Province: Ardabil
- County: Ungut
- District: Central
- Rural District: Angut-e Sharqi

Population (2016)
  - Total: 15
- Time zone: UTC+3:30 (IRST)

Tapalqa (Persian: تپلقا) (Note: Also romanized as Tapalqā; also known as Ţablgāh and Tepelgā) is a village in Angut-e Sharqi Rural District of the Central District (Note: Formerly Ungut District of Germi County) in Ungut County, Ardabil province, Iran.

== Demographics ==
=== Population ===
At the time of the 2006 National Census, the village's population was 46 in eight households, when it was in Ungut District (Note: Renamed the Central District of Ungut County) of Germi County. (Note: Formerly Moghan County) The following census in 2011 counted 31 people in six households. The 2016 census measured the population of the village as 15 people in four households.

In 2019, the district was separated from the county in the establishment of Ungut County and renamed the Central District.
