= Shaerlu =

Village in Ardabil province, Iran

Shaerlu Persian: شاعرلو
- Village
- Location within Iran
- Coordinates: 39°04′27″N 47°43′37″E
- Country: Iran
- Province: Ardabil
- County: Ungut
- District: Central
- Rural District: Angut-e Sharqi

Population (2016)
  - Total: 220
- Time zone: UTC+3:30 (IRST)

Shaerlu (Persian: شاعرلو) (Note: Also romanized as Shā‘erlū; also known as Shā‘erlar) is a village in Angut-e Sharqi Rural District of the Central District (Note: Formerly Ungut District of Germi County) in Ungut County, Ardabil province, Iran.

== Demographics ==
=== Population ===
At the time of the 2006 National Census, the village's population was 226 in 45 households, when it was in Ungut District (Note: Renamed the Central District of Ungut County) of Germi County. (Note: Formerly Moghan County) The following census in 2011 counted 218 people in 49 households. The 2016 census measured the population of the village as 220 people in 67 households.

In 2019, the district was separated from the county in the establishment of Ungut County and renamed the Central District.
