= Qabaleh Kandi =

Village in Ardabil province, Iran

Qabaleh Kandi Persian: قباله كندي
- Village
- Location within Iran
- Coordinates: 39°05′30″N 47°52′27″E
- Country: Iran
- Province: Ardabil
- County: Ungut
- District: Central
- Rural District: Angut-e Sharqi

Population (2016)
  - Total: 107
- Time zone: UTC+3:30 (IRST)

Qabaleh Kandi (Persian: قباله كندي) (Note: Also romanized as Qabāleh Kandī; also known as Qabāleh) is a village in Angut-e Sharqi Rural District of the Central District (Note: Formerly Ungut District of Germi County) in Ungut County, Ardabil province, Iran.

== Demographics ==
=== Population ===
At the time of the 2006 National Census, the village's population was 149 in 36 households, when it was in Ungut District (Note: Renamed the Central District of Ungut County) of Germi County. (Note: Formerly Moghan County) The following census in 2011 counted 98 people in 27 households. The 2016 census measured the population of the village as 107 people in 32 households.

In 2019, the district was separated from the county in the establishment of Ungut County and renamed the Central District.
