= Sharafeh, Ardabil =

Village in Ardabil province, Iran

Sharafeh Persian: شرفه
- Village
- Location within Iran
- Coordinates: 38°52′51″N 47°54′03″E
- Country: Iran
- Province: Ardabil
- County: Germi
- District: Central
- Rural District: Pain Barzand

Population (2016)
  - Total: 107
- Time zone: UTC+3:30 (IRST)

Sharafeh (Persian: شرفه) is a village in Pain Barzand Rural District of the Central District in Germi County, (Note: Formerly Moghan County) Ardabil province, Iran.

== Demographics ==
=== Population ===
At the time of the 2006 National Census, the village's population was 174 in 31 households, when it was in Ungut District. (Note: Renamed the Central District of Ungut County) The following census in 2011 counted 128 people in 31 households. The 2016 census measured the population of the village as 107 people in 35 households.

In 2019, the rural district was transferred to the Central District.
