= Damdabaja =

Village in Ardabil province, Iran

Damdabaja Persian: دامداباجا
- Village
- Location within Iran
- Coordinates: 38°54′50″N 47°52′01″E
- Country: Iran
- Province: Ardabil
- County: Germi
- District: Central
- Rural District: Pain Barzand

Population (2016)
  - Total: 47
- Time zone: UTC+3:30 (IRST)

Damdabaja (Persian: دامداباجا) (Note: Also romanized as Dāmdābājā; also known as Dāmdāpājā) is a village in Pain Barzand Rural District of the Central District in Germi County, (Note: Formerly Moghan County) Ardabil province, Iran.

== Demographics ==
=== Population ===
At the time of the 2006 National Census, the village's population was 78 in 22 households, when it was in Ungut District. (Note: Renamed the Central District of Ungut County) The following census in 2011 counted 56 people in 22 households. The 2016 census measured the population of the village as 47 people in 16 households.

In 2019, the rural district was transferred to the Central District.
