= Shahbazlu =

Village in Ardabil province, Iran

Shahbazlu Persian: شهبازلو
- Village
- Location within Iran
- Coordinates: 39°00′44″N 47°47′21″E
- Country: Iran
- Province: Ardabil
- County: Ungut
- District: Central
- Rural District: Angut-e Sharqi

Population (2016)
  - Total: 97
- Time zone: UTC+3:30 (IRST)

Shahbazlu (Persian: شهبازلو) (Note: Also romanized as Shahbāzlū) is a village in Angut-e Sharqi Rural District of the Central District (Note: Formerly Ungut District of Germi County) in Ungut County, Ardabil province, Iran.

== Demographics ==
=== Population ===
At the time of the 2006 National Census, the village's population was 127 in 26 households, when it was in Ungut District (Note: Renamed the Central District of Ungut County) of Germi County. (Note: Formerly Moghan County) The following census in 2011 counted 134 people in 31 households. The 2016 census measured the population of the village as 97 people in 25 households.

In 2019, the district was separated from the county in the establishment of Ungut County and renamed the Central District.
