= Borun Qeshlaq-e Sofla =

Village in Ardabil province, Iran

Borun Qeshlaq-e Sofla Persian: برون قشلاق سفلي
- Village
- Location within Iran
- Country: Iran
- Province: Ardabil
- County: Ungut
- District: Central
- Rural District: Angut-e Sharqi

Population (2016)
  - Total: 35
- Time zone: UTC+3:30 (IRST)

Borun Qeshlaq-e Sofla (Persian: برون قشلاق سفلي) (Note: Also romanized as Borūn Qeshlāq-e Soflá; also known as Borūn Qeshlāq) is a village in Angut-e Sharqi Rural District of the Central District (Note: Formerly Ungut District of Germi County) in Ungut County, Ardabil province, Iran.

== Demographics ==
=== Population ===
At the time of the 2006 National Census, the village's population was 51 in 10 households, when it was in Ungut District (Note: Renamed the Central District of Ungut County) of Germi County. (Note: Formerly Moghan County) The following census in 2011 counted 62 people in 16 households. The 2016 census measured the population of the village as 35 people in 11 households.

In 2019, the district was separated from the county in the establishment of Ungut County and renamed the Central District.
