= Takahchi, Ungut =

Village in Ardabil province, Iran

Takahchi Persian: تكه چي
- Village
- Location within Iran
- Coordinates: 38°59′19″N 47°48′23″E
- Country: Iran
- Province: Ardabil
- County: Ungut
- District: Central
- Rural District: Angut-e Sharqi

Population (2016)
  - Total: 43
- Time zone: UTC+3:30 (IRST)

Takahchi (Persian: تكه چي) (Note: Also romanized as Takahchī) is a village in Angut-e Sharqi Rural District of the Central District (Note: Formerly Ungut District of Germi County) in Ungut County, Ardabil province, Iran.

== Demographics ==
=== Population ===
At the time of the 2006 National Census, the village's population was 39 in seven households, when it was in Ungut District (Note: Renamed the Central District of Ungut County) of Germi County. (Note: Formerly Moghan County) The following census in 2011 counted 19 people in five households. The 2016 census measured the population of the village as 43 people in 12 households.

In 2019, the district was separated from the county in the establishment of Ungut County and renamed the Central District.
