= Tak Bolagh-e Angut =

Village in Ardabil province, Iran

Tak Bolagh-e Angut Persian: تكبلاغ انگوت
- Village
- Location within Iran
- Coordinates: 39°07′38″N 47°47′30″E
- Country: Iran
- Province: Ardabil
- County: Ungut
- District: Central
- Rural District: Angut-e Sharqi

Population (2016)
  - Total: 132
- Time zone: UTC+3:30 (IRST)

Tak Bolagh-e Angut (Persian: تكبلاغ انگوت) (Note: Also romanized as Tak Bolāgh-e Angūt; also known as Tak Bolāgh) is a village in Angut-e Sharqi Rural District of the Central District (Note: Formerly Ungut District of Germi County) in Ungut County, Ardabil province, Iran.

== Demographics ==
=== Population ===
At the time of the 2006 National Census, the village's population was 229 in 44 households, when it was in Ungut District (Note: Renamed the Central District of Ungut County) of Germi County. (Note: Formerly Moghan County) The following census in 2011 counted 188 people in 45 households. The 2016 census measured the population of the village as 132 people in 47 households.

In 2019, the district was separated from the county in the establishment of Ungut County and renamed the Central District.
