= Nasrollah Beyglu =

Village in Ardabil province, Iran

Nasrollah Beyglu Persian: نصراله بيگلو
- Village
- Location within Iran
- Coordinates: 39°01′14″N 47°55′50″E
- Country: Iran
- Province: Ardabil
- County: Germi
- District: Central
- Rural District: Pain Barzand

Population (2016)
  - Total: 314
- Time zone: UTC+3:30 (IRST)

Nasrollah Beyglu (Persian: نصراله بيگلو) (Note: Also romanized as Naşrollāh Beyglū) is a village in Pain Barzand Rural District of the Central District in Germi County, (Note: Formerly Moghan County) Ardabil province, Iran.

== Demographics ==
=== Population ===
At the time of the 2006 National Census, the village's population was 417 in 96 households, when it was in Ungut District. (Note: Renamed the Central District of Ungut County) The following census in 2011 counted 407 people in 109 households. The 2016 census measured the population of the village as 314 people in 92 households.

In 2019, the rural district was transferred to the Central District.
