= Asghar Khanlu =

Village in Ardabil province, Iran

Asghar Khanlu Persian: اصغرخانلو
- Village
- Location within Iran
- Coordinates: 38°59′26″N 47°45′54″E
- Country: Iran
- Province: Ardabil
- County: Ungut
- District: Central
- Rural District: Angut-e Sharqi

Population (2016)
  - Total: 148
- Time zone: UTC+3:30 (IRST)

Asghar Khanlu (Persian: اصغرخانلو) (Note: Also romanized as ‘Asghar Khānlū; also known as ‘Asgar Khānlū) is a village in Angut-e Sharqi Rural District of the Central District (Note: Formerly Ungut District of Germi County) in Ungut County, Ardabil province, Iran.

== Demographics ==
=== Population ===
At the time of the 2006 National Census, the village's population was 201 in 44 households, when it was in Ungut District (Note: Renamed the Central District of Ungut County) of Germi County. (Note: Formerly Moghan County) The following census in 2011 counted 172 people in 43 households. The 2016 census measured the population of the village as 148 people in 43 households.

In 2019, the district was separated from the county in the establishment of Ungut County and renamed the Central District.
