= Aqdash-e Sofla =

Village in Ardabil province, Iran

Aqdash-e Sofla Persian: اقداش سفلي
- Village
- Location within Iran
- Coordinates: 39°04′09″N 47°57′14″E
- Country: Iran
- Province: Ardabil
- County: Germi
- District: Central
- Rural District: Pain Barzand

Population (2016)
  - Total: 110
- Time zone: UTC+3:30 (IRST)

Aqdash-e Sofla (Persian: اقداش سفلي) (Note: Also romanized as Āqdāsh-e Soflá; also known as Āq Dāsh) is a village in Pain Barzand Rural District of the Central District in Germi County, (Note: Formerly Moghan County) Ardabil province, Iran.

== Demographics ==
=== Population ===
At the time of the 2006 National Census, the village's population was 168 in 31 households, when it was in Ungut District. (Note: Renamed the Central District of Ungut County) The following census in 2011 counted 142 people in 34 households. The 2016 census measured the population of the village as 110 people in 31 households.

In 2019, the rural district was transferred to the Central District.
