= Mikail Darrehsi =

Village in Ardabil province, Iran

Mikail Darrehsi Persian: ميكائيل دره سي
- Village
- Location within Iran
- Coordinates: 38°52′56″N 47°49′26″E
- Country: Iran
- Province: Ardabil
- County: Germi
- District: Central
- Rural District: Pain Barzand

Population (2016)
  - Total: 55
- Time zone: UTC+3:30 (IRST)

Mikail Darrehsi (Persian: ميكائيل دره سي) (Note: Also romanized as Mīkā’īl Darrasī and Mīkā'īl Darrehsī) is a village in Pain Barzand Rural District of the Central District in Germi County, (Note: Formerly Moghan County) Ardabil province, Iran.

== Demographics ==
=== Population ===
At the time of the 2006 National Census, the village's population was 90 in 18 households, when it was in Ungut District. (Note: Renamed the Central District of Ungut County) The following census in 2011 counted 51 people in 13 households. The 2016 census measured the population of the village as 55 people in 19 households.

In 2019, the rural district was transferred to the Central District.
