= Nariman, Ardabil =

Village in Ardabil province, Iran

Nariman Persian: نريمان
- Village
- Location within Iran
- Coordinates: 39°05′29″N 47°49′36″E
- Country: Iran
- Province: Ardabil
- County: Ungut
- District: Central
- Rural District: Angut-e Sharqi

Population (2016)
  - Total: 79
- Time zone: UTC+3:30 (IRST)

Nariman (Persian: نريمان) (Note: Also romanized as Narīmān) is a village in Angut-e Sharqi Rural District of the Central District (Note: Formerly Ungut District of Germi County) in Ungut County, Ardabil province, Iran.

== Demographics ==
=== Population ===
At the time of the 2006 National Census, the village's population was 157 in 26 households, when it was in Ungut District (Note: Renamed the Central District of Ungut County) of Germi County. (Note: Formerly Moghan County) The following census in 2011 counted 98 people in 20 households. The 2016 census measured the population of the village as 79 people in 22 households.

In 2019, the district was separated from the county in the establishment of Ungut County and renamed the Central District.
