= Shahmar Beyglu =

Village in Ardabil province, Iran

Shahmar Beyglu Persian: شهماربيگلو
- Village
- Location within Iran
- Coordinates: 39°00′12″N 47°55′18″E
- Country: Iran
- Province: Ardabil
- County: Germi
- District: Central
- Rural District: Pain Barzand

Population (2016)
  - Total: 170
- Time zone: UTC+3:30 (IRST)

Shahmar Beyglu (Persian: شهماربيگلو) (Note: Also romanized as Shahmār Beyglū) is a village in Pain Barzand Rural District of the Central District in Germi County, (Note: Formerly Moghan County) Ardabil province, Iran.

== Demographics ==
=== Population ===
At the time of the 2006 National Census, the village's population was 236 in 47 households, when it was in Ungut District. (Note: Renamed the Central District of Ungut County) The following census in 2011 counted 201 people in 49 households. The 2016 census measured the population of the village as 170 people in 53 households.

In 2019, the rural district was transferred to the Central District.
