= Panjeh Ali Kharabehsi =

Village in Ardabil province, Iran

Panjeh Ali Kharabehsi Persian: پنجه علي خرابه سي
- Village
- Location within Iran
- Coordinates: 39°09′26″N 47°49′34″E
- Country: Iran
- Province: Ardabil
- County: Ungut
- District: Central
- Rural District: Angut-e Sharqi

Population (2016)
  - Total: 72
- Time zone: UTC+3:30 (IRST)

Panjeh Ali Kharabehsi (Persian: پنجه علي خرابه سي) (Note: Also romanized as Panjeh ‘Alī Kharābehsī; also known as Panj ‘Alī) is a village in Angut-e Sharqi Rural District of the Central District (Note: Formerly Ungut District of Germi County) in Ungut County, Ardabil province, Iran.

== Demographics ==
=== Population ===
At the time of the 2006 National Census, the village's population was 190 in 41 households, when it was in Ungut District (Note: Renamed the Central District of Ungut County) of Germi County. (Note: Formerly Moghan County) The following census in 2011 counted 98 people in 26 households. The 2016 census measured the population of the village as 72 people in 22 households.

In 2019, the district was separated from the county in the establishment of Ungut County and renamed the Central District.
