= Hajj Ahmad Kandi =

Village in Ardabil province, Iran

Hajj Ahmad Kandi Persian: حاج احمدكندي
- Village
- Location within Iran
- Coordinates: 39°02′14″N 47°56′18″E
- Country: Iran
- Province: Ardabil
- County: Germi
- District: Central
- Rural District: Pain Barzand

Population (2016)
  - Total: 80
- Time zone: UTC+3:30 (IRST)

Hajj Ahmad Kandi (Persian: حاج احمدكندي) (Note: Also romanized as Ḩājj Aḩmad Kandī; also known as Ḩājjī Aḩmad) is a village in Pain Barzand Rural District of the Central District in Germi County, (Note: Formerly Moghan County) Ardabil province, Iran.

== Demographics ==
=== Population ===
At the time of the 2006 National Census, the village's population was 110 in 20 households, when it was in Ungut District. (Note: Renamed the Central District of Ungut County) The following census in 2011 counted 89 people in 24 households. The 2016 census measured the population of the village as 80 people in 29 households.

In 2019, the rural district was transferred to the Central District.
