= Qasem Kandi, Germi =

Village in Ardabil province, Iran

Qasem Kandi Persian: قاسم كندي
- Village
- Location within Iran
- Coordinates: 38°57′28″N 47°53′25″E
- Country: Iran
- Province: Ardabil
- County: Germi
- District: Central
- Rural District: Pain Barzand

Population (2016)
  - Total: 494
- Time zone: UTC+3:30 (IRST)

Qasem Kandi (Persian: قاسم كندي) (Note: Also romanized as Qāsem Kandī) is a village in, and the capital of, Pain Barzand Rural District in the Central District of Germi County, (Note: Formerly Moghan County) Ardabil province, Iran.

== Demographics ==
=== Population ===
The 2006 National Census recorded the population of the village as 660 in 140 households, when it was in Ungut District. (Note: Renamed the Central District of Ungut County) The following census in 2011 counted 519 people in 143 households. The 2016 census measured the population of the village as 494 people in 154 households. It was the most populous village in its rural district.

In 2019, the rural district was transferred to the Central District.
