= Seyyedabad, Ardabil =

Village in Ardabil province, Iran

Seyyedabad Persian: سيداباد
- Village
- Location within Iran
- Coordinates: 39°05′55″N 47°43′04″E
- Country: Iran
- Province: Ardabil
- County: Ungut
- District: Central
- Rural District: Angut-e Sharqi

Population (2016)
  - Total: 169
- Time zone: UTC+3:30 (IRST)

Seyyedabad (Persian: سيداباد) (Note: Also romanized as Seyyedābād; also known as Tulachi) is a village in Angut-e Sharqi Rural District of the Central District (Note: Formerly Ungut District of Germi County) in Ungut County, Ardabil province, Iran.

== Demographics ==
=== Population ===
At the time of the 2006 National Census, the village's population was 211 in 37 households, when it was in Ungut District (Note: Renamed the Central District of Ungut County) of Germi County. (Note: Formerly Moghan County) The following census in 2011 counted 166 people in 38 households. The 2016 census measured the population of the village as 169 people in 47 households.

In 2019, the district was separated from the county in the establishment of Ungut County and renamed the Central District.
