= Kahel Qeshlaq =

Village in Ardabil province, Iran

Kahel Qeshlaq Persian: كهل قشلاق
- Village
- Location within Iran
- Coordinates: 39°08′01″N 47°54′46″E
- Country: Iran
- Province: Ardabil
- County: Ungut
- District: Central
- Rural District: Angut-e Sharqi

Population (2016)
  - Total: 22
- Time zone: UTC+3:30 (IRST)

Kahel Qeshlaq (Persian: كهل قشلاق) (Note: Also romanized as Kahel Qeshlāq) is a village in Angut-e Sharqi Rural District of the Central District (Note: Formerly Ungut District of Germi County) in Ungut County, Ardabil province, Iran.

== Demographics ==
=== Population ===
At the time of the 2006 National Census, the village's population was 32 in eight households, when it was in Ungut District (Note: Renamed the Central District of Ungut County) of Germi County. (Note: Formerly Moghan County) The following census in 2011 counted 32 people in 10 households. The 2016 census measured the population of the village as 22 people in six households.

In 2019, the district was separated from the county in the establishment of Ungut County and renamed the Central District.
