= Qeshlaq-e Jeda =

Village in Ardabil province, Iran

Qeshlaq-e Jeda Persian: قشلاق جدا
- Village
- Location within Iran
- Coordinates: 39°06′29″N 47°46′56″E
- Country: Iran
- Province: Ardabil
- County: Ungut
- District: Central
- Rural District: Angut-e Sharqi

Population (2016)
  - Total: 85
- Time zone: UTC+3:30 (IRST)

Qeshlaq-e Jeda (Persian: قشلاق جدا) (Note: Also romanized as Qeshlāq-e Jedā; also known as Jedā Qeshlāq (جدا قشلاق) and Jedā Qeshlāqī (جدا قشلاقي)) is a village in Angut-e Sharqi Rural District of the Central District (Note: Formerly Ungut District of Germi County) in Ungut County, Ardabil province, Iran.

== Demographics ==
=== Population ===
At the time of the 2006 National Census, the village's population was 142 in 25 households, when it was in Ungut District (Note: Renamed the Central District of Ungut County) of Germi County. (Note: Formerly Moghan County) The following census in 2011 counted 109 people in 27 households. The 2016 census measured the population of the village as 85 people in 28 households.

In 2019, the district was separated from the county in the establishment of Ungut County and renamed the Central District.
