= Sari Daraq =

Sari Daraq (Persian: ساري درق) may refer to:

- Sari Daraq, Ardabil
- Sari Daraq, Abish Ahmad, Kaleybar County, East Azerbaijan Province
- Sari Daraq, Meyaneh, East Azerbaijan Province
