= Jabilu =

Village in Ardabil province, Iran

Jabilu Persian: جبيلو
- Village
- Location within Iran
- Coordinates: 38°58′56″N 47°47′15″E
- Country: Iran
- Province: Ardabil
- County: Ungut
- District: Central
- Rural District: Angut-e Sharqi

Population (2016)
  - Total: 125
- Time zone: UTC+3:30 (IRST)

Jabilu (Persian: جبيلو) (Note: Also romanized as Jabīlū; also known as Jabalū) is a village in Angut-e Sharqi Rural District of the Central District (Note: Formerly Ungut District of Germi County) in Ungut County, Ardabil province, Iran.

== Demographics ==
=== Population ===
At the time of the 2006 National Census, the village's population was 212 in 44 households, when it was in Ungut District (Note: Renamed the Central District of Ungut County) of Germi County. (Note: Formerly Moghan County) The following census in 2011 counted 165 people in 41 households. The 2016 census measured the population of the village as 125 people in 35 households.

In 2019, the district was separated from the county in the establishment of Ungut County and renamed the Central District.
