= Mohammad Qoli =

- Mohammad Qoli Beyglu, a village in Germi County, Ardabil Province, Iran
- Mohammad Qoli-ye Sofla, a village in Sirjan County, Kerman Province, Iran
- Darreh-ye Mohammad Qoli, a village in Dowreh County, Lorestan Province, Iran
- Qeshlaq-e Mohammad Qoli, multiple villages in Iran
- Bariki-ye Mohammad Qoli, a village in Dezful County, Khuzestan Province, Iran
- Dehnow-e Mohammad Qoli, a village in Lordegan County, Chaharmahal and Bakhtiari Province, Iran
