= Abbas Alilu =

Village in Ardabil province, Iran

Abbas Alilu Persian: عباس عليلو
- Village
- Location within Iran
- Coordinates: 39°00′59″N 47°43′33″E
- Country: Iran
- Province: Ardabil
- County: Ungut
- District: Central
- Rural District: Angut-e Sharqi

Population (2016)
  - Total: 312
- Time zone: UTC+3:30 (IRST)

Abbas Alilu (Persian: عباسعلی‌لو) (Note: Also romanized as ‘Abbās ‘Alīlū) is a village in Angut-e Sharqi Rural District of the Central District (Note: Formerly Ungut District of Germi County) in Ungut County, Ardabil province, Iran.

== Demographics ==
=== Population ===
At the time of the 2006 National Census, the village's population was 369 in 81 households, when it was in Ungut District (Note: Renamed the Central District of Ungut County) of Germi County. (Note: Formerly Moghan County) The following census in 2011 counted 313 people in 68 households. The 2016 census measured the population of the village as 312 people in 88 households.

In 2019, the district was separated from the county in the establishment of Ungut County and renamed the Central District.
