= Mohammad Taqi Kandi =

Village in Ardabil province, Iran

Mohammad Taqi Kandi Persian: محمدتقي كندي
- Village
- Location within Iran
- Coordinates: 39°03′48″N 47°51′31″E
- Country: Iran
- Province: Ardabil
- County: Ungut
- District: Central
- Rural District: Angut-e Sharqi

Population (2016)
  - Total: 422
- Time zone: UTC+3:30 (IRST)

Mohammad Taqi Kandi (Persian: محمدتقي كندي) (Note: Also romanized as Moḩammad Taqī Kandī; also known as Moḩammad Taqī) is a village in, and the capital of, Angut-e Sharqi Rural District in the Central District (Note: Formerly Ungut District of Germi County) of Ungut County, Ardabil province, Iran.

== Demographics ==
=== Population ===
At the time of the 2006 National Census, the village's population was 671 in 151 households, when it was in Ungut District (Note: Renamed the Central District of Ungut County) of Germi County. (Note: Formerly Moghan County) The following census in 2011 counted 628 people in 184 households. The 2016 census measured the population of the village as 422 people in 139 households.

In 2019, the district was separated from the county in the establishment of Ungut County and renamed the Central District.
