= Oruj Alilu =

Village in Ardabil province, Iran

Oruj Alilu Persian: اروج عليلو
- Village
- Location within Iran
- Coordinates: 38°59′56″N 47°44′19″E
- Country: Iran
- Province: Ardabil
- County: Ungut
- District: Central
- Rural District: Angut-e Sharqi

Population (2016)
  - Total: 130
- Time zone: UTC+3:30 (IRST)

Oruj Alilu (Persian: اروج عليلو) (Note: Also romanized as Orūj ‘Alīlū) is a village in Angut-e Sharqi Rural District of the Central District (Note: Formerly Ungut District of Germi County) in Ungut County, Ardabil province, Iran.

== Demographics ==
=== Population ===
At the time of the 2006 National Census, the village's population was 131 in 30 households, when it was in Ungut District (Note: Renamed the Central District of Ungut County) of Germi County. (Note: Formerly Moghan County) The following census in 2011 counted 117 people in 29 households. The 2016 census measured the population of the village as 130 people in 42 households.

In 2019, the district was separated from the county in the establishment of Ungut County and renamed the Central District.
