= Qilulu =

Village in Ardabil province, Iran

Qilulu Persian: قيلولو
- Village
- Country: Iran
- Province: Ardabil
- County: Ungut
- District: Central
- Rural District: Angut-e Sharqi

Population (2016)
  - Total: 134
- Time zone: UTC+3:30 (IRST)

Qilulu (Persian: قيلولو) (Note: Also romanized as Qīlūlū) is a village in Angut-e Sharqi Rural District of the Central District (Note: Formerly Ungut District of Germi County) in Ungut County, Ardabil province, Iran.

== Demographics ==
=== Population ===
At the time of the 2006 National Census, the village's population was 167 in 38 households, when it was in Ungut District (Note: Renamed the Central District of Ungut County) of Germi County. (Note: Formerly Moghan County) The following census in 2011 counted 163 people in 45 households. The 2016 census measured the population of the village as 134 people in 42 households.

In 2019, the district was separated from the county in the establishment of Ungut County and renamed the Central District.
