= Esmaili Kandi =

Village in Ardabil province, Iran

Esmaili Kandi Persian: اسمعلي كندي
- Village
- Location within Iran
- Coordinates: 38°57′45″N 47°53′39″E
- Country: Iran
- Province: Ardabil
- County: Germi
- District: Central
- Rural District: Pain Barzand

Population (2016)
  - Total: 104
- Time zone: UTC+3:30 (IRST)

Esmaili Kandi (Persian: اسمعلي كندي) (Note: Also romanized as Esmā‘īlī Kandī; also known as Esmā‘īl Kandī) is a village in Pain Barzand Rural District of the Central District in Germi County, (Note: Formerly Moghan County) Ardabil province, Iran.

== Demographics ==
=== Population ===
At the time of the 2006 National Census, the village's population was 166 in 35 households, when it was in Ungut District. (Note: Renamed the Central District of Ungut County) The following census in 2011 counted 154 people in 39 households. The 2016 census measured the population of the village as 104 people in 36 households.

In 2019, the rural district was transferred to the Central District.
