= Pirlu, Iran =

Village in Ardabil province, Iran

Pirlu Persian: پيرلو
- Village
- Location within Iran
- Coordinates: 39°01′29″N 47°43′08″E
- Country: Iran
- Province: Ardabil
- County: Ungut
- District: Central
- Rural District: Angut-e Sharqi

Population (2016)
  - Total: 203
- Time zone: UTC+3:30 (IRST)

Pirlu (Persian: پيرلو) (Note: Also romanized as Pīrlū; also known as Pīr ‘Alīlū (پیر علیلو)) is a village in Angut-e Sharqi Rural District of the Central District (Note: Formerly Ungut District of Germi County) in Ungut County, Ardabil province, Iran.

== Demographics ==
=== Population ===
At the time of the 2006 National Census, the village's population was 242 in 47 households, when it was in Ungut District (Note: Renamed the Central District of Ungut County) of Germi County. (Note: Formerly Moghan County) The following census in 2011 counted 196 people in 43 households. The 2016 census measured the population of the village as 203 people in 60 households.

In 2019, the district was separated from the county in the establishment of Ungut County and renamed the Central District.
