= Nurollah Beyglu =

Village in Ardabil province, Iran

Nurollah Beyglu Persian: نوراله بيگلو
- Village
- Location within Iran
- Coordinates: 39°00′55″N 47°55′21″E
- Country: Iran
- Province: Ardabil
- County: Germi
- District: Central
- Rural District: Pain Barzand

Population (2016)
  - Total: 52
- Time zone: UTC+3:30 (IRST)

Nurollah Beyglu (Persian: نوراله بيگلو) (Note: Also romanized as Nūrollāh Beyglū) is a village in Pain Barzand Rural District of the Central District in Germi County, (Note: Formerly Moghan County) Ardabil province, Iran.

== Demographics ==
=== Population ===
At the time of the 2006 National Census, the village's population was 93 in 20 households, when it was in Ungut District. (Note: Renamed the Central District of Ungut County) The following census in 2011 counted 76 people in 19 households. The 2016 census measured the population of the village as 52 people in 18 households.

In 2019, the rural district was transferred to the Central District.
