= Mollalu, Ungut =

Village in Ardabil province, Iran

Mollalu Persian: ملالو
- Village
- Location within Iran
- Coordinates: 39°03′12″N 47°43′56″E
- Country: Iran
- Province: Ardabil
- County: Ungut
- District: Central
- Rural District: Angut-e Sharqi

Population (2016)
  - Total: 477
- Time zone: UTC+3:30 (IRST)

Mollalu (Persian: ملالو) (Note: Also romanized as Mollālū; also known as Māllālār, Mollālar, and Mollālor (مالالار)) is a village in Angut-e Sharqi Rural District of the Central District (Note: Formerly Ungut District of Germi County) in Ungut County, Ardabil province, Iran.

== Demographics ==
=== Population ===
At the time of the 2006 National Census, the village's population was 459 in 85 households, when it was in Ungut District (Note: Renamed the Central District of Ungut County) of Germi County. (Note: Formerly Moghan County) The following census in 2011 counted 456 people in 100 households. The 2016 census measured the population of the village as 477 people in 135 households.

In 2019, the district was separated from the county in the establishment of Ungut County and renamed the Central District.
