= Ebrahim Kandi, Germi =

Village in Ardabil province, Iran

Ebrahim Kandi Persian: ابراهيم كندي
- Village
- Location within Iran
- Country: Iran
- Province: Ardabil
- County: Germi
- District: Central
- Rural District: Pain Barzand

Population (2016)
  - Total: 118
- Time zone: UTC+3:30 (IRST)

Ebrahim Kandi (Persian: ابراهيم كندي) (Note: Also romanized as Ebrāhīm Kandī) is a village in Pain Barzand Rural District of the Central District in Germi County, (Note: Formerly Moghan County) Ardabil province, Iran.

== Demographics ==
=== Population ===
At the time of the 2006 National Census, the village's population was 128 in 27 households, when it was in Ungut District. (Note: Renamed the Central District of Ungut County) The following census in 2011 counted 121 people in 28 households. The 2016 census measured the population of the village as 118 people in 40 households.

In 2019, the rural district was transferred to the Central District.
