= Chalak =

Chalak or Chelak (Persian: چلك) may refer to:

- Chalak, Ardabil
- Chalak, Lahijan, Gilan Province
- Chelak, Rasht, Gilan Province
- Chelak, Uzbekistan
- Chelak, Rajasthan, India
