= Damirchi Darrehsi-ye Sofla =

Village in Ardabil province, Iran

Damirchi Darrehsi-ye Sofla Persian: دميرچي دره سي سفلي
- Village
- Location within Iran
- Coordinates: 38°55′32″N 47°54′09″E
- Country: Iran
- Province: Ardabil
- County: Germi
- District: Central
- Rural District: Pain Barzand

Population (2016)
  - Total: 65
- Time zone: UTC+3:30 (IRST)

Damirchi Darrehsi-ye Sofla (Persian: دميرچي دره سي سفلي) (Note: Also romanized as Damīrchī Darrehsī-ye Soflá; also known as Damīrchī Darrehsī-ye Pā'īn) is a village in Pain Barzand Rural District of the Central District in Germi County, (Note: Formerly Moghan County) Ardabil province, Iran.

== Demographics ==
=== Population ===
At the time of the 2006 National Census, the village's population was 124 in 27 households, when it was in Ungut District. (Note: Renamed the Central District of Ungut County) The following census in 2011 counted 101 people in 24 households. The 2016 census measured the population of the village as 65 people in 16 households.

In 2019, the rural district was transferred to the Central District.
