= Damirchi Darrehsi =

Damirchi Darrehsi (Persian: دميرچي دره سي) may refer to:

- Damirchi Darrehsi-ye Olya
- Damirchi Darrehsi-ye Sofla
