= Mohammad Qoli Beyglu =

Village in Ardabil province, Iran

Mohammad Qoli Beyglu Persian: محمدقلي بيگ لو
- Village
- Location within Iran
- Coordinates: 39°07′37″N 47°51′04″E
- Country: Iran
- Province: Ardabil
- County: Ungut
- District: Central
- Rural District: Angut-e Sharqi

Population (2016)
  - Total: 48
- Time zone: UTC+3:30 (IRST)

Mohammad Qoli Beyglu (Persian: محمدقلي بيگ لو) (Note: Also romanized as Moḩammad Qolī Beyglū) is a village in Angut-e Sharqi Rural District of the Central District (Note: Formerly Ungut District of Germi County) in Ungut County, Ardabil province, Iran.

== Demographics ==
=== Population ===
At the time of the 2006 National Census, the village's population was 54 in seven households, when it was in Ungut District (Note: Renamed the Central District of Ungut County) of Germi County. (Note: Formerly Moghan County) The following census in 2011 counted 59 people in 13 households. The 2016 census measured the population of the village as 48 people in 13 households.

In 2019, the district was separated from the county in the establishment of Ungut County and renamed the Central District.
