= Marallui-ye Jafarqoli Khanlu =

Village in Ardabil province, Iran

Marallui-ye Jafarqoli Khanlu Persian: ماراللوي جعفرقلي خانلو
- Village
- Location within Iran
- Coordinates: 38°58′08″N 47°49′26″E
- Country: Iran
- Province: Ardabil
- County: Ungut
- District: Central
- Rural District: Angut-e Sharqi

Population (2016)
  - Total: 48
- Time zone: UTC+3:30 (IRST)

Marallui-ye Jafarqoli Khanlu (Persian: ماراللوي جعفرقلي خانلو) (Note: Also romanized as Marallu-ye Jafarqoli Khanlu and Mārāllū-ye Ja‘farqolī Khānlū; also known as Mārāllū and Morālalū-ye Ja‘farqolī Khānlū) is a village in Angut-e Sharqi Rural District of the Central District (Note: Formerly Ungut District of Germi County) in Ungut County, Ardabil province, Iran.

== Demographics ==
=== Population ===
At the time of the 2006 National Census, the village's population was 82 in 20 households, when it was in Ungut District (Note: Renamed the Central District of Ungut County) of Germi County. (Note: Formerly Moghan County) The following census in 2011 counted 57 people in 16 households. The 2016 census measured the population of the village as 48 people in 13 households.

In 2019, the district was separated from the county in the establishment of Ungut County and renamed the Central District.
