= Jeda, Iran =

Village in Ardabil province, Iran

Jeda Persian: جدا
- Village
- Location within Iran
- Coordinates: 39°06′03″N 47°48′05″E
- Country: Iran
- Province: Ardabil
- County: Ungut
- District: Central
- Rural District: Angut-e Sharqi

Population (2016)
  - Total: 237
- Time zone: UTC+3:30 (IRST)

Jeda (Persian: جدا) (Note: Also romanized as Jedā and Jodā; also known as Ajīdeh) is a village in Angut-e Sharqi Rural District of the Central District (Note: Formerly Ungut District of Germi County) in Ungut County, Ardabil province, Iran.

== Demographics ==
=== Population ===
At the time of the 2006 National Census, the village's population was 356 in 72 households, when it was in Ungut District (Note: Renamed the Central District of Ungut County) of Germi County. (Note: Formerly Moghan County) The following census in 2011 counted 293 people in 71 households. The 2016 census measured the population of the village as 237 people in 69 households.

In 2019, the district was separated from the county in the establishment of Ungut County and renamed the Central District.
