= Ali Mohammadlu, Germi =

Village in Ardabil province, Iran

Ali Mohammadlu Persian: علي محمدلو
- Village
- Location within Iran
- Coordinates: 39°02′53″N 47°56′06″E
- Country: Iran
- Province: Ardabil
- County: Germi
- District: Central
- Rural District: Pain Barzand

Population (2016)
  - Total: 51
- Time zone: UTC+3:30 (IRST)

Ali Mohammadlu (Persian: علي محمدلو) (Note: Also romanized as ‘Alī Moḩammadlū) is a village in Pain Barzand Rural District of the Central District in Germi County, (Note: Formerly Moghan County) Ardabil province, Iran.

== Demographics ==
=== Population ===
At the time of the 2006 National Census, the village's population was 76 in 16 households, when it was in Ungut District. (Note: Renamed the Central District of Ungut County) The following census in 2011 counted 76 people in 20 households. The 2016 census measured the population of the village as 51 people in 17 households.

In 2019, the rural district was transferred to the Central District.
