= Khan Mohammadlu =

Village in Ardabil province, Iran

Khan Mohammadlu Persian: خان محمدلو
- Village
- Location within Iran
- Coordinates: 39°08′27″N 47°48′28″E
- Country: Iran
- Province: Ardabil
- County: Ungut
- District: Central
- Rural District: Angut-e Sharqi

Population (2016)
  - Total: 75
- Time zone: UTC+3:30 (IRST)

Khan Mohammadlu (Persian: خان محمدلو) (Note: Also romanized as Khān Moḩammadlū; also known as Khān Moḩammad) is a village in Angut-e Sharqi Rural District of the Central District (Note: Formerly Ungut District of Germi County) in Ungut County, Ardabil province, Iran.

== Demographics ==
=== Population ===
At the time of the 2006 National Census, the village's population was 177 in 34 households, when it was in Ungut District (Note: Renamed the Central District of Ungut County) of Germi County. (Note: Formerly Moghan County) The following census in 2011 counted 147 people in 34 households. The 2016 census measured the population of the village as 75 people in 22 households.

In 2019, the district was separated from the county in the establishment of Ungut County and renamed the Central District.
