= Ezmareh =

Ezmareh or Azmareh (Persian: اظماره) may refer to:

- Ezmareh-ye Olya
- Ezmareh-ye Sofla
