= Qatar-e Olya =

Village in Ardabil province, Iran

Qatar-e Olya Persian: قطارعليا
- Village
- Location within Iran
- Coordinates: 39°04′22″N 47°49′15″E
- Country: Iran
- Province: Ardabil
- County: Ungut
- District: Central
- Rural District: Angut-e Sharqi

Population (2016)
  - Total: 55
- Time zone: UTC+3:30 (IRST)

Qatar-e Olya (Persian: قطارعليا) (Note: Also romanized as Qaţār-e ‘Olyā; also known as Qaţār Qayah) is a village in Angut-e Sharqi Rural District of the Central District (Note: Formerly Ungut District of Germi County) in Ungut County, Ardabil province, Iran.

== Demographics ==
=== Population ===
At the time of the 2006 National Census, the village's population was 145 in 28 households, when it was in Ungut District (Note: Renamed the Central District of Ungut County) of Germi County. (Note: Formerly Moghan County) The following census in 2011 counted 125 people in 26 households. The 2016 census measured the population of the village as 55 people in 14 households.

In 2019, the district was separated from the county in the establishment of Ungut County and renamed the Central District.
