= Mansurlu, Iran =

Village in Ardabil province, Iran

Mansurlu Persian: منصورلو
- Village
- Location within Iran
- Coordinates: 39°01′12″N 47°50′31″E
- Country: Iran
- Province: Ardabil
- County: Ungut
- District: Central
- Rural District: Angut-e Sharqi

Population (2016)
  - Total: 27
- Time zone: UTC+3:30 (IRST)

Mansurlu (Persian: منصورلو) (Note: Also romanized as Manşūrlū; also known as Tappeh-ye Manşūrlū) is a village in Angut-e Sharqi Rural District of the Central District (Note: Formerly Ungut District of Germi County) in Ungut County, Ardabil province, Iran.

== Demographics ==
=== Population ===
At the time of the 2006 National Census, the village's population was 37 in seven households, when it was in Ungut District (Note: Renamed the Central District of Ungut County) of Germi County. (Note: Formerly Moghan County) The following census in 2011 counted 34 people in nine households. The 2016 census measured the population of the village as 27 people in seven households.

In 2019, the district was separated from the county in the establishment of Ungut County and renamed the Central District.
