= Damirchi Darrehsi-ye Olya =

Village in Ardabil province, Iran

Damirchi Darrehsi-ye Olya Persian: دميرچي دره سي عليا
- Village
- Location within Iran
- Coordinates: 38°55′14″N 47°55′10″E
- Country: Iran
- Province: Ardabil
- County: Germi
- District: Central
- Rural District: Pain Barzand

Population (2016)
  - Total: 40
- Time zone: UTC+3:30 (IRST)

Damirchi Darrehsi-ye Olya (Persian: دميرچي دره سي عليا) (Note: Also romanized as Damīrchī Darrehsī-ye 'Olyā; also known as Damīrchī Darrehsī-ye Bālā) is a village in Pain Barzand Rural District of the Central District in Germi County, (Note: Formerly Moghan County) Ardabil province, Iran.

== Demographics ==
=== Population ===
At the time of the 2006 National Census, the village's population was 52 in 13 households, when it was in Ungut District. (Note: Renamed the Central District of Ungut County) The following census in 2011 counted 46 people in 13 households. The 2016 census measured the population of the village as 40 people in 13 households.

In 2019, the rural district was transferred to the Central District.
