= Garmi-ye Angut =

Village in Ardabil province, Iran

Garmi-ye Angut Persian: گرمي انگوت
- Village
- Location within Iran
- Coordinates: 39°03′44″N 47°44′19″E
- Country: Iran
- Province: Ardabil
- County: Ungut
- District: Central
- Rural District: Angut-e Sharqi

Population (2016)
  - Total: 491
- Time zone: UTC+3:30 (IRST)

Garmi-ye Angut (Persian: گرمي انگوت) (Note: Also romanized as Garmi Angut and Garmī Angūt; also known as Garmī) is a village in Angut-e Sharqi Rural District of the Central District (Note: Formerly Ungut District of Germi County) in Ungut County, Ardabil province, Iran.

== Demographics ==
=== Population ===
At the time of the 2006 National Census, the village's population was 504 in 100 households, when it was in Ungut District (Note: Renamed the Central District of Ungut County) of Germi County. (Note: Formerly Moghan County) The following census in 2011 counted 517 people in 112 households. The 2016 census measured the population of the village as 491 people in 135 households. It was the most populous village in its rural district.

In 2020, the district was separated from the county in the establishment of Ungut County and renamed the Central District.
