= Garma =

Garma may refer to:

== Geography ==
- Al-Karmah, a city in Iraq, also spelt Garma
- Garma, Iran, a village in Kerman Province, Iran
- Garma, Khuzestan, a village in Khuzestan Province, Iran
- Garma, Nepal, a former village development committee in Nepal
- Garma, Tibet, a place in Tibet

== Other uses ==
- Garma (album), an album by Yothu Yindi
- Garma Festival of Traditional Cultures (a.k.a. Garma), a festival celebrating Yolngu culture in Arnhem Land, Northern Territory, Australia
- Garma Zabi (ガルマザビ), a character in the fictional universe of Mobile Suit Gundam
