= Shabanlu =

Shabanlu (Persian: شعبانلو) may refer to:

- Shabanlu, Germi, Ardabil Province
- Shabanlu, Meshgin Shahr, Ardabil Province
- Shabanlu, West Azerbaijan
- Shabanlu, Khoy, West Azerbaijan Province
