= Shur Daraq-e Sofla =

Village in Ardabil province, Iran

Shur Daraq-e Sofla Persian: شوردرق سفلي
- Village
- Location within Iran
- Coordinates: 39°02′41″N 47°48′56″E
- Country: Iran
- Province: Ardabil
- County: Ungut
- District: Central
- Rural District: Angut-e Sharqi

Population (2016)
  - Total: 108
- Time zone: UTC+3:30 (IRST)

Shur Daraq-e Sofla (Persian: شوردرق سفلي) (Note: Also romanized as Shūr Daraq-e Soflá; also known as Shūr Daraq and Shūr Daraq-e Pā'īn) is a village in Angut-e Sharqi Rural District of the Central District (Note: Formerly Ungut District of Germi County) in Ungut County, Ardabil province, Iran.

== Demographics ==
=== Population ===
At the time of the 2006 National Census, the village's population was 196 in 45 households, when it was in Ungut District (Note: Renamed the Central District of Ungut County) of Germi County. (Note: Formerly Moghan County) The following census in 2011 counted 145 people in 41 households. The 2016 census measured the population of the village as 108 people in 32 households.

In 2019, the district was separated from the county in the establishment of Ungut County and renamed the Central District.
