= Mansurlu =

Mansurlu can refer to:

- Mansurlu, Azerbaijan
- Mansurlu, Iran
