= Marallu =

Marallu (Persian: ماراللو) may refer to:

- Marallu-ye Jafarqoli Khanlu
- Marallu-ye Kalbalu
