= Shabanlu, Ungut =

Village in Ardabil province, Iran

Shabanlu Persian: شعبانلو
- Village
- Location within Iran
- Coordinates: 39°01′30″N 47°51′20″E
- Country: Iran
- Province: Ardabil
- County: Ungut
- District: Central
- Rural District: Angut-e Sharqi

Population (2016)
  - Total: 49
- Time zone: UTC+3:30 (IRST)

Shabanlu (Persian: شعبانلو) (Note: Also romanized as Sha‘bānlū) is a village in Angut-e Sharqi Rural District of the Central District (Note: Formerly Ungut District of Germi County) in Ungut County, Ardabil province, Iran.

== Demographics ==
=== Population ===
At the time of the 2006 National Census, the village's population was 108 in 22 households, when it was in Ungut District (Note: Renamed the Central District of Ungut County) of Germi County. (Note: Formerly Moghan County) The following census in 2011 counted 55 people in 17 households. The 2016 census measured the population of the village as 49 people in 18 households.

In 2019, the district was separated from the county in the establishment of Ungut County and renamed the Central District.
