= Tang, Ardabil =

Village in Ardabil province, Iran

Tang Persian: تنگ
- Village
- Location within Iran
- Coordinates: 39°00′18″N 48°04′21″E
- Country: Iran
- Province: Ardabil
- County: Germi
- District: Central
- Rural District: Ani

Population (2016)
  - Total: 163
- Time zone: UTC+3:30 (IRST)

Tang (Persian: تنگ) is a village in Ani Rural District of the Central District in Germi County, (Note: Formerly Moghan County) Ardabil province, Iran.

== Demographics ==
=== Population ===
At the time of the 2006 National Census, the village's population was 187 in 42 households. The following census in 2011 counted 156 people in 44 households. The 2016 census measured the population of the village as 163 people in 46 households.
