= Qanbarlu =

Village in Ardabil province, Iran

Qanbarlu Persian: قنبرلو
- Village
- Location within Iran
- Coordinates: 39°01′32″N 48°08′44″E
- Country: Iran
- Province: Ardabil
- County: Germi
- District: Central
- Rural District: Ani

Population (2016)
  - Total: 104
- Time zone: UTC+3:30 (IRST)

Qanbarlu (Persian: قنبرلو) (Note: Also romanized as Qanbarlū) is a village in Ani Rural District of the Central District in Germi County, (Note: Formerly Moghan County) Ardabil province, Iran.

== Demographics ==
=== Population ===
At the time of the 2006 National Census, the village's population was 208 in 42 households. The following census in 2011 counted 127 people in 36 households. The 2016 census measured the population of the village as 104 people in 34 households.
