= Ali Mohammadlu =

Ali Mohammadlu (Persian: علي محمدلو) may refer to:

- Ali Mohammadlu, Germi
- Ali Mohammadlu, Meshgin Shahr
