= Ani-ye Sofla =

Village in Ardabil province, Iran

Ani-ye Sofla Persian: اني سفلي
- Village
- Location within Iran
- Coordinates: 38°58′51″N 48°08′38″E
- Country: Iran
- Province: Ardabil
- County: Germi
- District: Central
- Rural District: Ani

Population (2016)
  - Total: 525
- Time zone: UTC+3:30 (IRST)

Ani-ye Sofla (Persian: اني سفلي) (Note: Also romanized as Ānī Soflá, Anī-ye Soflá, Īnī Soflá, and Īnī-ye Soflá; also known as Anī-ye Pā’īn, Annī-ye Pā’īn, Īnī Pā’īn, and Īnī-ye Pā’īn) is a village in Ani Rural District of the Central District in Germi County, (Note: Formerly Moghan County) Ardabil province, Iran.

== Demographics ==
=== Population ===
At the time of the 2006 National Census, the village's population was 550 in 104 households. The following census in 2011 counted 598 people in 141 households. The 2016 census measured the population of the village as 525 people in 148 households.
