= Shayon =

Shayon is a given name and a surname. Notable people with this name include the following:

== Given name ==
- Shayon Green (born 1991), American gridiron football player
- Shayon Harrison (born 1997), English footballer

== Surname ==
- Robert Lewis Shayon (1912–2008), American writer and producer

== See also ==
- Sharon
- Shavon (disambiguation)
- Shayan
