= Angut =

Angut (Persian: انگوت) may refer to:

- Angut-e Gharbi Rural District
- Angut-e Sharqi Rural District
