= Alila =

Alila may refer to:

- Alila (film), a 2003 Israeli drama film
- Alila Hotels and Resorts, a hotel chain
- Alila, real estate company, based in Lyon, owned by Herve Legros

== See also ==
- Alilah, Iran
