= Shavon =

Shavon (Persian: شاون), also rendered as Shadoon and Shaun, may refer to:

- Shavon-e Olya
- Shavon-e Sofla

== Name ==
- Shavon Revel (born 2001), American football player
- Shavon Shields (born 1994), Danish basketballer
