= Ani-ye Vosta =

Village in Ardabil province, Iran

Ani-ye Vosta Persian: اني وسطي
- Village
- Location within Iran
- Coordinates: 38°58′50″N 48°08′23″E
- Country: Iran
- Province: Ardabil
- County: Germi
- District: Central
- Rural District: Ani

Population (2016)
  - Total: 443
- Time zone: UTC+3:30 (IRST)

Ani-ye Vosta (Persian: اني وسطي) (Note: Also romanized as Ānī-ye Vosţá; also known as Anī-ye Vasaţ, Anī-ye Vasaţī) is a village in Ani Rural District of the Central District in Germi County, (Note: Formerly Moghan County) Ardabil province, Iran.

== Demographics ==
=== Population ===
At the time of the 2006 National Census, the village's population was 696 in 114 households. The following census in 2011 counted 641 people in 152 households. The 2016 census measured the population of the village as 443 people in 120 households.
