= Arzanaq =

Arzanaq (Persian: ارزنق) may refer to:

- Arzanaq, Ardabil
- Arzanaq, East Azerbaijan
