= Alileh Sar =

Village in Ardabil province, Iran

Alileh Sar Persian: اليله سر
- Village
- Location within Iran
- Coordinates: 39°00′14″N 48°12′45″E
- Country: Iran
- Province: Ardabil
- County: Germi
- District: Central
- Rural District: Ani

Population (2016)
  - Total: 92
- Time zone: UTC+3:30 (IRST)

Alileh Sar (Persian: اليله سر) (Note: Also romanized as Alīleh Sar and ‘Alīlahsar) is a village in Ani Rural District of the Central District in Germi County, (Note: Formerly Moghan County) Ardabil province, Iran.

== Demographics ==
=== Population ===
At the time of the 2006 National Census, the village's population was 169 in 32 households. The following census in 2011 counted 137 people in 32 households. The 2016 census measured the population of the village as 92 people in 21 households.
