= Gigal =

Village in Ardabil province, Iran

Gigal Persian: گيگال
- Village
- Location within Iran
- Coordinates: 38°58′54″N 48°11′39″E
- Country: Iran
- Province: Ardabil
- County: Germi
- District: Central
- Rural District: Ani

Population (2016)
  - Total: 22
- Time zone: UTC+3:30 (IRST)

Gigal (Persian: گيگال) (Note: Also romanized as Gīgāl) is a village in Ani Rural District of the Central District in Germi County, (Note: Formerly Moghan County) Ardabil province, Iran.

== Demographics ==
=== Population ===
At the time of the 2006 National Census, the village's population was 82 in 19 households. The following census in 2011 counted 14 people in four households. The 2016 census measured the population of the village as 22 people in seven households.
