= Qarah Yataq =

Village in Ardabil province, Iran

Qarah Yataq Persian: قره ياتاق
- Village
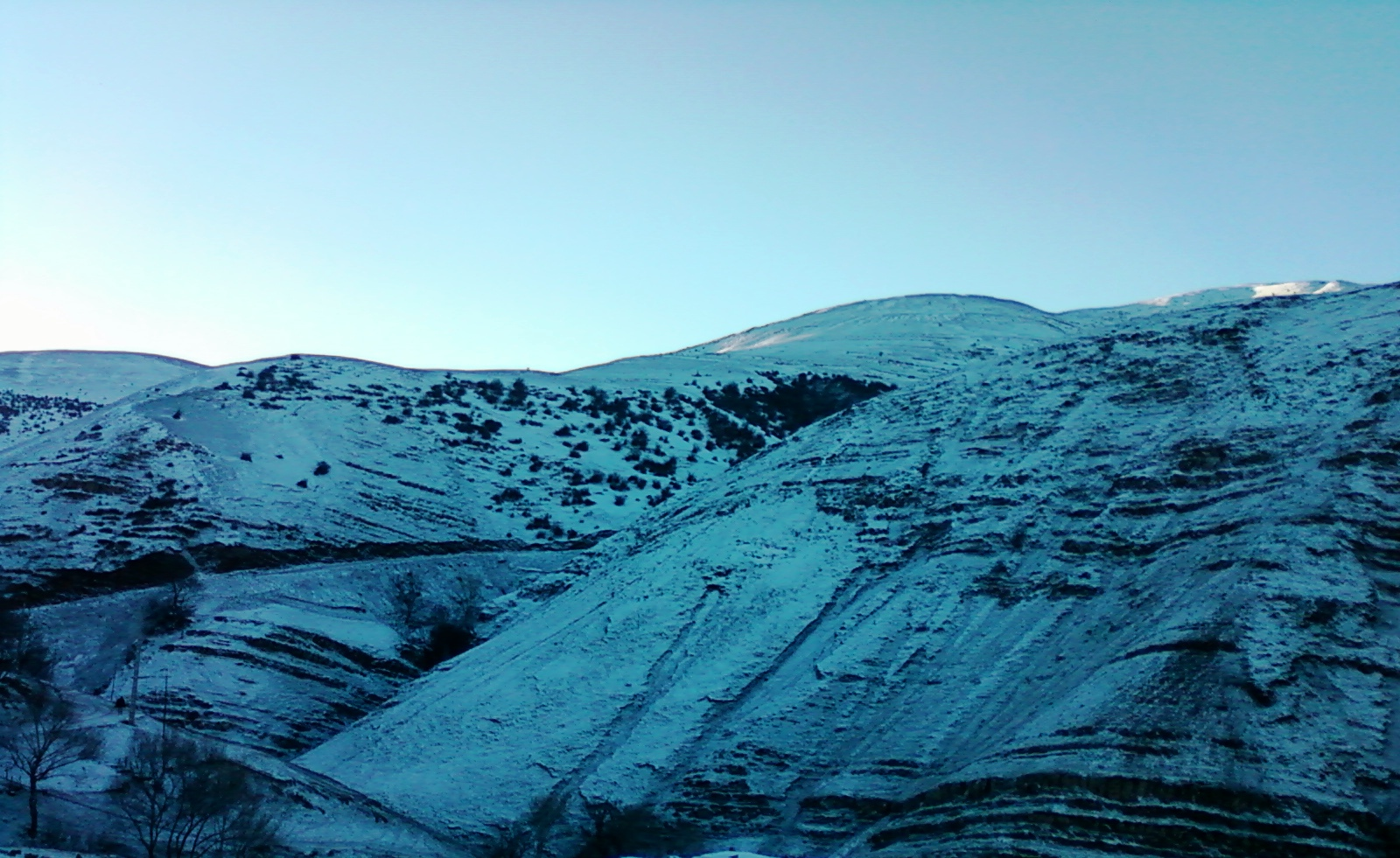

- Location within Iran
- Coordinates: 39°00′50″N 48°12′17″E
- Country: Iran
- Province: Ardabil
- County: Germi
- District: Central
- Rural District: Ani

Population (2016)
  - Total: 76
- Time zone: UTC+3:30 (IRST)

Qarah Yataq (Persian: قره ياتاق) (Note: Also romanized as Qarah Yātāq) is a village in Ani Rural District of the Central District in Germi County, (Note: Formerly Moghan County) Ardabil province, Iran.

== Demographics ==
=== Population ===
At the time of the 2006 National Census, the village's population was 136 in 27 households. The following census in 2011 counted 99 people in 26 households. The 2016 census measured the population of the village as 76 people in 21 households.

== See also ==
Media related to Qarah Yataq at Wikimedia Commons
