= Ebrahim Kandi =

Ebrahim Kandi (Persian: ابراهيم كندي) may refer to several villages in Iran:

- Ebrahim Kandi, Germi
- Ebrahim Kandi, Meshgin Shahr
- Ebrahim Kandi-ye Vosta, Parsabad County
