= Tappeh, Germi =

Village in Ardabil province, Iran

Tappeh Persian: تپه
- Village
- Location within Iran
- Coordinates: 39°01′49″N 48°11′03″E
- Country: Iran
- Province: Ardabil
- County: Germi
- District: Central
- Rural District: Ani

Population (2016)
  - Total: 406
- Time zone: UTC+3:30 (IRST)

Tappeh (Persian: تپه) (Note: Also romanized as Tapeh) is a village in Ani Rural District of the Central District in Germi County, (Note: Formerly Moghan County) Ardabil province, Iran.

== Demographics ==
=== Population ===
At the time of the 2006 National Census, the village's population was 459 in 104 households. The following census in 2011 counted 406 people in 122 households. The 2016 census measured the population of the village as 444 people in 140 households.
