= Jeda =

Jeda may refer to:

- Jeda (born 1979), Jedaias Capucho Neves, Brazilian footballer
- Jedah Dohma, fictional character in game Darkstalkers
- Jedda, Australian film
- Jeddah, Saudi Arabian city
- Jeddah, Battle of Jeddah (1813)
- Jeda, Iran, a village in Iran
