= Ani-ye Olya =

Village in Ardabil province, Iran

Ani-ye Olya Persian: اني عليا
- Village
- Location within Iran
- Coordinates: 38°58′28″N 48°07′57″E
- Country: Iran
- Province: Ardabil
- County: Germi
- District: Central
- Rural District: Ani

Population (2016)
  - Total: 813
- Time zone: UTC+3:30 (IRST)

Ani-ye Olya (Persian: اني عليا) (Note: Also romanized as Ānī-ye ‘Olyā; also known as Ānī, Anī-ye Bālā, Annī-ye Bālā, Ini, and Inj) is a village in, and the capital of, Ani Rural District in the Central District of Germi County, (Note: Formerly Moghan County) Ardabil province, Iran.

== Demographics ==
=== Population ===
At the time of the 2006 National Census, the village's population was 1,164 in 195 households. The following census in 2011 counted 992 people in 239 households. The 2016 census measured the population of the village as 813 people in 221 households. It was the most populous village in its rural district.
