= Tazeh Kand-e Qarah Bolagh =

Village in Ardabil province, Iran

Tazeh Kand-e Qarah Bolagh Persian: تازه كندقره بلاغ
- Village
- Location within Iran
- Coordinates: 38°58′15″N 48°11′39″E
- Country: Iran
- Province: Ardabil
- County: Germi
- District: Central
- Rural District: Ani

Population (2016)
  - Total: 65
- Time zone: UTC+3:30 (IRST)

Tazeh Kand-e Qarah Bolagh (Persian: تازه كندقره بلاغ) (Note: Also romanized as Tāzeh Kand-e Qarah Bolāgh; also known as Tāzeh Kand) is a village in Ani Rural District of the Central District in Germi County, (Note: Formerly Moghan County) Ardabil province, Iran.

== Demographics ==
=== Population ===
At the time of the 2006 National Census, the village's population was 89 in 15 households. The following census in 2011 counted 83 people in 20 households. The 2016 census measured the population of the village as 65 people in 26 households.
