= Biaraq =

Village in Ardabil province, Iran

Biaraq Persian: بيعرق
- Village
- Location within Iran
- Coordinates: 38°59′24″N 48°10′05″E
- Country: Iran
- Province: Ardabil
- County: Germi
- District: Central
- Rural District: Ani

Population (2016)
  - Total: 32
- Time zone: UTC+3:30 (IRST)

Biaraq (Persian: بيعرق) (Note: Also romanized as Bī‘araq; also known as Bī‘areh) is a village in Ani Rural District of the Central District in Germi County, (Note: Formerly Moghan County) Ardabil province, Iran.

== Demographics ==
=== Population ===
At the time of the 2006 National Census, the village's population was 44 in eight households. The following census in 2011 counted 36 people in eight households. The 2016 census measured the population of the village as 32 people in eight households.
