= Shavon-e Sofla =

Village in Ardabil province, Iran

Shavon-e Sofla Persian: شاون سفلي
- Village
- Location within Iran
- Coordinates: 39°01′17″N 48°10′26″E
- Country: Iran
- Province: Ardabil
- County: Germi
- District: Central
- Rural District: Ani

Population (2016)
  - Total: 20
- Time zone: UTC+3:30 (IRST)

Shavon-e Sofla (Persian: شاون سفلي) (Note: Also romanized as Shāvon-e Soflá; also known as Shadoon Sofla, Shaun, Shāvon, and Shāvon-e Pā’īn) is a village in Ani Rural District of the Central District in Germi County, (Note: Formerly Moghan County) Ardabil province, Iran.

== Demographics ==
=== Population ===
At the time of the 2006 National Census, the village's population was 23 in five households. The following census in 2011 counted a population below the reporting threshold. The 2016 census measured the population of the village as 20 people in five households.
