= Chalak, Ardabil =

Village in Ardabil province, Iran

Chalak Persian: چلك
- Village
- Location within Iran
- Coordinates: 38°59′06″N 48°06′22″E
- Country: Iran
- Province: Ardabil
- County: Germi
- District: Central
- Rural District: Ani

Population (2016)
  - Total: 404
- Time zone: UTC+3:30 (IRST)

Chalak (Persian: چلك) is a village in Ani Rural District of the Central District in Germi County, (Note: Formerly Moghan County) Ardabil province, Iran.

== Demographics ==
=== Population ===
At the time of the 2006 National Census, the village's population was 459 in 107 households. The following census in 2011 counted 449 people in 126 households. The 2016 census measured the population of the village as 484 people in 124 households.
