= Katar (disambiguation) =

Katar is a type of push dagger from India.

It may refer to the following places in India:

- Katar, Karnataka
- Katar, Bhojpur, Bihar

== See also ==
- Qatar (disambiguation)
- Catarrh (disambiguation)
