= Sari Daraq, Ardabil =

Village in Ardabil province, Iran

Sari Daraq Persian: ساري درق
- Village
- Location within Iran
- Coordinates: 38°59′42″N 48°05′30″E
- Country: Iran
- Province: Ardabil
- County: Germi
- District: Central
- Rural District: Ani

Population (2016)
  - Total: 104
- Time zone: UTC+3:30 (IRST)

Sari Daraq (Persian: ساري درق) (Note: Also romanized as Sārī Daraq) is a village in Ani Rural District of the Central District in Germi County, (Note: Formerly Moghan County) Ardabil province, Iran.

== Demographics ==
=== Population ===
At the time of the 2006 National Census, the village's population was 162 in 25 households. The following census in 2011 counted 108 people in 23 households. The 2016 census measured the population of the village as 104 people in 31 households.
