= Ezmareh-ye Olya =

Village in Ardabil province, Iran

Ezmareh-ye Olya Persian: اظماره عليا
- Village
- Location within Iran
- Coordinates: 39°00′48″N 48°07′53″E
- Country: Iran
- Province: Ardabil
- County: Germi
- District: Central
- Rural District: Ani

Population (2016)
  - Total: 444
- Time zone: UTC+3:30 (IRST)

Ezmareh-ye Olya (Persian: اظماره عليا) (Note: Also romanized as Ez̧māreh-ye ‘Olyā; also known as Az̧māreh and Ez̧māreh-ye Bālā) is a village in Ani Rural District of the Central District in Germi County, (Note: Formerly Moghan County) Ardabil province, Iran.

== Demographics ==
=== Population ===
At the time of the 2006 National Census, the village's population was 800 in 171 households. The following census in 2011 counted 743 people in 190 households. The 2016 census measured the population of the village as 444 people in 140 households.
