= Ezmareh-ye Sofla =

Village in Ardabil province, Iran

Ezmareh-ye Sofla Persian: اظماره سفلي
- Village
- Location within Iran
- Coordinates: 39°02′10″N 48°08′27″E
- Country: Iran
- Province: Ardabil
- County: Germi
- District: Central
- Rural District: Ani

Population (2016)
  - Total: 21
- Time zone: UTC+3:30 (IRST)

Ezmareh-ye Sofla (Persian: اظماره سفلي) (Note: Also romanized as Ez̧māreh-ye Soflá; also known as ‘Abdollāh Kandī and Ez̧māreh-ye Pā’īn) is a village in Ani Rural District of the Central District in Germi County, (Note: Formerly Moghan County) Ardabil province, Iran.

== Demographics ==
=== Population ===
At the time of the 2006 National Census, the village's population was 46 in 11 households. The following census in 2011 counted 28 people in 10 households. The 2016 census measured the population of the village as 21 people in nine households.
