= Shavon-e Olya =

Village in Ardabil province, Iran

Shavon-e Olya Persian: شاون عليا
- Village
- Location within Iran
- Coordinates: 39°00′08″N 48°10′24″E
- Country: Iran
- Province: Ardabil
- County: Germi
- District: Central
- Rural District: Ani

Population (2016)
  - Total: 35
- Time zone: UTC+3:30 (IRST)

Shavon-e Olya (Persian: شاون عليا) (Note: Also romanized as Shāvon-e ‘Olyā; also known as Shadoon Olya and Shāvon-e Bālā) is a village in Ani Rural District of the Central District in Germi County, (Note: Formerly Moghan County) Ardabil province, Iran.

== Demographics ==
=== Population ===
At the time of the 2006 National Census, the village's population was 126 in 24 households. The following census in 2011 counted 60 people in 14 households. The 2016 census measured the population of the village as 15 people in 10 households.
