= Dashdibi =

Village in Ardabil province, Iran

Dashdibi Persian: داشديبي
- Village
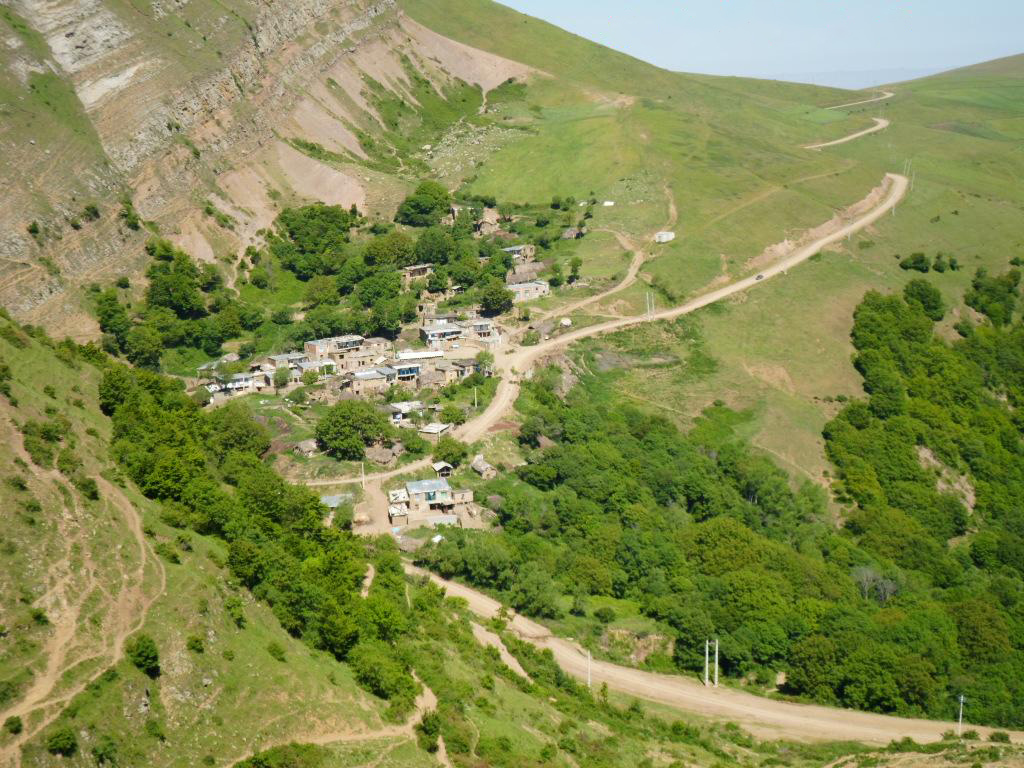
- The village of Dashdibi

- Location within Iran
- Coordinates: 38°58′01″N 48°12′27″E
- Country: Iran
- Province: Ardabil
- County: Germi
- District: Central
- Rural District: Ani

Population (2016)
  - Total: 80
- Time zone: UTC+3:30 (IRST)

Dashdibi (Persian: داشديبي) (Note: Also romanized as Dāshdībī; also known as Dāshdebī) is a village in Ani Rural District of the Central District in Germi County, (Note: Formerly Moghan County) Ardabil province, Iran.

== Demographics ==
=== Population ===
At the time of the 2006 National Census, the village's population was 92 in 16 households. The following census in 2011 counted 81 people in 18 households. The 2016 census measured the population of the village as 80 people in 28 households.
