= Alileh =

Village in Ardabil province, Iran

Alileh Persian: اليله
- Village
- Location within Iran
- Coordinates: 38°58′35″N 48°10′04″E
- Country: Iran
- Province: Ardabil
- County: Germi
- District: Central
- Rural District: Ani

Population (2016)
  - Total: 308
- Time zone: UTC+3:30 (IRST)

Alileh (Persian: اليله) (Note: Also romanized as Alilah, Alīlah, and Alīleh; also known as Ālāyl and Ālāylah) is a village in Ani Rural District of the Central District in Germi County, (Note: Formerly Moghan County) Ardabil province, Iran.

== Demographics ==
=== Population ===
At the time of the 2006 National Census, the village's population was 430 in 90 households. The following census in 2011 counted 371 people in 85 households. The 2016 census measured the population of the village as 308 people in 99 households.
