= Ani Rural District =

Rural district in Ardabil province, Iran

Ani Rural District Persian: دهستان اني
- Rural District
- Location within Iran
- Coordinates: 39°00′N 48°09′E
- Country: Iran
- Province: Ardabil
- County: Germi
- District: Central
- Established: 1990
- Capital: Ani-ye Olya

Population (2016)
  - Total: 4,364
- Time zone: UTC+3:30 (IRST)

Ani Rural District (Persian: دهستان اني) is in the Central District of Germi County, (Note: Formerly Moghan County) Ardabil province, Iran. Its capital is the village of Ani-ye Olya.

== Demographics ==
=== Population ===
At the time of the 2006 National Census, the rural district's population was 6,251 in 1,220 households. There were 5,421 inhabitants in 1,351 households at the following census of 2011. The 2016 census measured the population of the rural district as 4,364 in 1,289 households. The most populous of its 22 villages was Ani-ye Olya, with 813 people.

=== Other villages in the rural district ===
- Alileh
- Alileh Sar
- Ani-ye Sofla
- Ani-ye Vosta
- Biaraq
- Chalak
- Dashdibi
- Ezmareh-ye Olya
- Ezmareh-ye Sofla
- Gigal
- Qanbarlu
- Qarah Bolagh
- Qarah Yataq
- Quzlu
- Sari Daraq
- Shavon-e Olya
- Shavon-e Sofla
- Tang
- Tappeh
- Tazeh Kand-e Qarah Bolagh
