= Catarrh (disambiguation) =

Catarrh is an inflammation of mucous membranes in one of the airways or cavities of the body. It can result in a thick exudate of mucus and white blood cells.

Catarrh or catarrhal may also refer to:

- Catarrh, South Carolina, United States, a settlement
- Spring catarrh, a seasonal, warm-weather type of conjunctivitis (pink eye)
- Malignant catarrhal fever, a disease of cattle, sheep and other ruminants
- Catarrhal Noise, an Italian thrash metal band

== See also ==
- Qatar (disambiguation)
- Katar (disambiguation)
