= Qeshlaq-e Mohammad Qoli =

Qeshlaq-e Mohammad Qoli (Persian: قشلاق محمدقلي) may refer to:

- Qeshlaq-e Mohammad Qoli, Ardabil, a village in Ardabil Province, Iran
- Qeshlaq-e Mohammad Qoli, West Azerbaijan, a village in West Azerbaijan Province, Iran
