= Angut-e Sharqi Rural District =

Rural district in Ardabil province, Iran

Angut-e Sharqi Rural District Persian: دهستان انگوت شرقي
- Rural District
- Location within Iran
- Coordinates: 39°04′N 47°49′E
- Country: Iran
- Province: Ardabil
- County: Ungut
- District: Central
- Established: 1987
- Capital: Mohammad Taqi Kandi

Population (2016)
  - Total: 6,969
- Time zone: UTC+3:30 (IRST)

Angut-e Sharqi Rural District (Persian: دهستان انگوت شرقي) is in the Central District (Note: Formerly Ungut District of Germi County) of Ungut County, Ardabil province, Iran. Its capital is the village of Mohammad Taqi Kandi. The previous capital of the rural district was the village of Tazeh Kand-e Angut, now the city of Angut.

== Demographics ==
=== Population ===
At the time of the 2006 National Census, the rural district's population (as a part of Ungut District (Note: Renamed the Central District of Ungut County) in Germi County) (Note: Formerly Moghan County) was 9,532 in 1,922 households. There were 8,207 inhabitants in 1,967 households at the following census of 2011. The 2016 census measured the population of the rural district as 6,969 in 2,068 households. The most populous of its 54 villages was Garmi Angut, with 491 people.

In 2019, the district was separated from the county in the establishment of Ungut County and renamed the Central District.

=== Other villages in the rural district ===
- Abbas Alilu
- Ahad Beyglu
- Arzanaq
- Asghar Khanlu
- Borun Qeshlaq-e Sofla
- Chenar
- Dargahlu
- Darreh Gahlui-ye Barzand
- Dash Bolagh-e Barzand
- Dash Qapu
- Hadilu
- Hoseyn Khanlu
- Jabilu
- Jahangirlu
- Jeda
- Kahel Qeshlaq
- Khan Mohammadlu
- Khanali Darrehsi
- Kuramalu
- Mansurlu
- Marallui-ye Kalbalu
- Marallui-ye Jafarqoli Khanlu
- Mohammad Qoli Beyglu
- Mollalu
- Nariman
- Oruj Alilu
- Owch Bolagh
- Panjeh Ali Kharabehsi
- Pirlu
- Qabaleh Kandi
- Qatar-e Olya
- Qatar-e Sofla
- Qeshlaq-e Bakhshali
- Qeshlaq-e Jeda
- Qilulu
- Qorbanlu
- Sarilar
- Seyyedabad
- Shabanlu
- Shaerlu
- Shahbazlu
- Shur Daraq-e Olya
- Shur Daraq-e Sofla
- Tak Bolagh-e Angut
- Takahchi
- Tapalqa
- Yelsui
