= Mansurlu, Azerbaijan =

Mansurlu
- Location within Azerbaijan
- Coordinates: 41°02′N 45°42′E
- Country: Azerbaijan
- Rayon: Tovuz
- Time zone: UTC+4 (AZT)
  - Summer (DST): UTC+5 (AZT)

Mansurlu is a village in the Tovuz Rayon of Azerbaijan.
