= Sardaraq =

Sardaraq سردرق
- Village
- Location within Iran
- Coordinates: 37°09′26″N 48°05′26″E
- Country: Iran
- Province: East Azerbaijan
- County: Meyaneh
- Bakhsh: Kaghazkonan
- Rural District: Kaghazkonan-e Markazi

Population (2006)
  - Total: 69
- Time zone: UTC+3:30 (IRST)
  - Summer (DST): UTC+4:30 (IRDT)

Sardaraq (Persian: سردرق; also known as Sārī Daraq, Sārī Dareh, Sāridarreh, and Saridarrekh) is a village in Kaghazkonan-e Markazi Rural District, Kaghazkonan District, Meyaneh County, East Azerbaijan Province, Iran. At the 2006 census, its population was 69, in 23 families.
