= Chelak, Rajasthan =

Village in Jaisalmer District, India

Chelak
- Village
- Location in Rajasthan, India Chelak (India)
- Coordinates: 26.496°N 70.901°E
- Country: India
- State: Rājasthān
- District: Jaisalmer
- Tehsil: Fatehgarh

Government
  - Body: Gram Panchayat
- Elevation: 102 m (335 ft)

Population
  - Total: 2,546

Languages
  - Official: Hindi
- Time zone: UTC+5.30 (IST)
- PIN: 345001
- Vehicle registration: RJ-15
- Nearest City: Jaisalmer
- Lok Sabha constituency: Barmer (Lok Sabha constituency)
- Vidhan Sabha constituency: Jaisalmer (Rajasthan Assembly constituency)
- Website: Website

Chelak is the village of Jaisalmer district from Rajasthan. this is situated in South basiya area of jaisalmer which is formally known for the brave bhati clan of rajput.
