= Qatar, East Azerbaijan =

Qatar قاطار
- Village
- Location within Iran
- Coordinates: 39°06′27″N 47°30′21″E
- Country: Iran
- Province: East Azerbaijan
- County: Kaleybar
- Bakhsh: Abish Ahmad
- Rural District: Abish Ahmad

Population (2006)
  - Total: 257
- Time zone: UTC+3:30 (IRST)
  - Summer (DST): UTC+4:30 (IRDT)

Qatar (Persian: قاطار, also Romanized as Qāţār and Qaţār) is a village in Abish Ahmad Rural District, Abish Ahmad District, Kaleybar County, East Azerbaijan Province, Iran. At the 2006 census, its population was 257, in 51 families.
