= Qeshlaq-e Mohammad Qoli, West Azerbaijan =

Qeshlaq-e Mohammad Qoli قشلاق محمدقلي
- Village
- Location within Iran
- Coordinates: 37°32′42″N 45°14′17″E
- Country: Iran
- Province: West Azerbaijan
- County: Urmia
- Bakhsh: Central
- Rural District: Bakeshluchay

Population (2006)
  - Total: 104
- Time zone: UTC+3:30 (IRST)
  - Summer (DST): UTC+4:30 (IRDT)

Qeshlaq-e Mohammad Qoli (Persian: قشلاق محمدقلي, also Romanized as Qeshlāq-e Moḩammad Qolī) is a village in Bakeshluchay Rural District, in the Central District of Urmia County, West Azerbaijan Province, Iran. At the 2006 census, its population was 104, in 29 families.
