= Angut, Iran =

City in Ardabil province, Iran

Angut Persian: انگوت
- City
- Location within Iran
- Coordinates: 39°02′45″N 47°44′39″E
- Country: Iran
- Province: Ardabil
- County: Ungut
- District: Central

Population (2016)
  - Total: 2,645
- Time zone: UTC+3:30 (IRST)

Angut (Persian: انگوت) (Note: Formerly Tazeh Kand-e Angut (تازه كند انگوت), also romanized as Tāzeh Kand-e Angūt; also known as Tāzeh Kand) is a city in the Central District (Note: Formerly Ungut District of Germi County) of Ungut County, Ardabil province, Iran, serving as capital of both the county and the district.

== Demographics ==
=== Population ===
At the time of the 2006 National Census, the city's population was 1,556 in 364 households, when it was in Ungut District (Note: Renamed the Central District of Ungut County) of Germi County. (Note: Formerly Moghan County) The following census in 2011 counted 2,544 people in 598 households. The 2016 census measured the population of the city as 2,645 people in 717 households.

In 2019, the district was separated from the county in the establishment of Ungut County and renamed the Central District, with Angut as capital of the new county.
