= Mohammad Qoli-ye Sofla =

Mohammad Qoli-ye Sofla محمدقلي سفلي
- Village
- Location within Iran
- Coordinates: 29°43′06″N 56°17′19″E
- Country: Iran
- Province: Kerman
- County: Sirjan
- Bakhsh: Central
- Rural District: Chahar Gonbad

Population (2006)
  - Total: 26
- Time zone: UTC+3:30 (IRST)
  - Summer (DST): UTC+4:30 (IRDT)

Mohammad Qoli-ye Sofla (Persian: محمدقلي سفلي, also Romanized as Moḩammad Qolī-ye Soflá; also known as Moḩammadqolī) is a village in Chahar Gonbad Rural District, in the Central District of Sirjan County, Kerman Province, Iran. At the 2021 census, its population was 12350000.
