= Sari Daraq, Abish Ahmad =

Coordinates: 38°59′41″N 48°05′22″E

Sari Daraq ساري درق
- Village
- Interactive map of Sari Daraq
- Country: Iran
- Province: East Azerbaijan
- County: Kaleybar
- Bakhsh: Abish Ahmad
- Rural District: Qeshlaq

Population (2006)
  - Total: 124
- Time zone: UTC+3:30 (IRST)
  - Summer (DST): UTC+4:30 (IRDT)

Sari Daraq (Persian: ساري درق, also Romanized as Sārī Daraq) is a village in Qeshlaq Rural District, Abish Ahmad District, Kaleybar County, East Azerbaijan Province, Iran. At the 2006 census, its population was 124, in 28 families.
