= Shabanluy-e Sofla =

Shabanluy-e Sofla شعبان لوي سفلي
- Village
- Location within Iran
- Coordinates: 38°26′10″N 44°54′53″E
- Country: Iran
- Province: West Azerbaijan
- County: Khoy
- Bakhsh: Central
- Rural District: Rahal

Population (2006)
  - Total: 390
- Time zone: UTC+3:30 (IRST)
  - Summer (DST): UTC+4:30 (IRDT)

Shabanluy-e Sofla (Persian: شعبان لوي سفلي, also Romanized as Sha‘bānlūy-e Soflá; also known as Sha‘bānlū) is a village in Rahal Rural District, in the Central District of Khoy County, West Azerbaijan Province, Iran. At the 2006 census, its population was 390, in 82 families.
