= Garma, Iran =

Garma گرما
- Village
- Location within Iran
- Coordinates: 30°24′45″N 55°13′25″E
- Country: Iran
- Province: Kerman
- County: Shahr-e Babak
- Bakhsh: Dehaj
- Rural District: Jowzam

Population (2006)
  - Total: 65
- Time zone: UTC+3:30 (IRST)
  - Summer (DST): UTC+4:30 (IRDT)

Garma (Persian: گرما, also Romanized as Garmā; also known as Garmī) is a village in Jowzam Rural District, Dehaj District, Shahr-e Babak County, Kerman Province, Iran. At the 2006 census, its population was 65, in 14 families.
