= Pain Barzand Rural District =

Rural district in Ardabil province, Iran

Pain Barzand Rural District Persian: دهستان پائين برزند
- Rural District
- Location within Iran
- Coordinates: 38°58′N 47°53′E
- Country: Iran
- Province: Ardabil
- County: Germi
- District: Central
- Established: 1987
- Capital: Qasem Kandi

Population (2016)
  - Total: 2,557
- Time zone: UTC+3:30 (IRST)

Pain Barzand Rural District (Persian: دهستان پائين برزند) is in the Central District of Germi County, (Note: Formerly Moghan County) Ardabil province, Iran. Its capital is the village of Qasem Kandi.

== Demographics ==
=== Population ===
At the time of the 2006 National Census, the rural district's population (as a part of Ungut District (Note: Renamed the Central District of Ungut County)) was 3,600 in 755 households. There were 3,088 inhabitants in 810 households at the following census of 2011. The 2016 census measured the population of the rural district as 2,557 in 811 households. The most populous of its 30 villages was Qasem Kandi, with 494 people.

In 2019, the rural district was transferred to the Central District.

=== Other villages in the rural district ===
- Ali Mohammadlu
- Aqdash-e Sofla
- Damdabaja
- Damirchi Darrehsi-ye Olya
- Damirchi Darrehsi-ye Sofla
- Ebrahim Kandi
- Esmaili Kandi
- Hajj Ahmad Kandi
- Mikail Darrehsi
- Nasrollah Beyglu
- Nurollah Beyglu
- Qaleh Barzand
- Shahmar Beyglu
- Sharafeh
- Tavus Darrehsi
- Tusanlui-ye Barzand
