= Central District (Ungut County) =

District in Ardabil province, Iran

Central District (Ungut County) Persian: بخش مرکزی شهرستان انگوت
- District
- Location within Iran
- Coordinates: 39°01′N 47°43′E
- Country: Iran
- Province: Ardabil
- County: Ungut
- Capital: Angut

Population (2016)
  - Total: 22,892 (Note: As Ungut District of Germi County)
- Time zone: UTC+3:30 (IRST)

The Central District of Ungut County (Persian: بخش مرکزی شهرستان انگوت) (Note: Formerly Ungut District of Germi County) is in Ardabil province, Iran. Its capital is the city of Angut. (Note: Formerly Tazeh Kand-e Angut)

== History ==
In 2019, Ungut District was separated from Germi County (Note: Formerly Moghan County) in the establishment of Ungut County, which was divided into two districts of two rural districts each, with Angut as its capital and only city at the time. At the same time, Pain Barzand Rural District was transferred to the Central District of Germi County.

== Demographics ==
=== Population ===
At the time of the 2006 census, the district's population (as Ungut District of Germi County) was 27,494 in 5,626 households. The following census in 2011 counted 25,694 people in 6,295 households. The 2016 census measured the population of the district as 22,892 inhabitants living in 6,549 households.

=== Administrative divisions ===
Central District (Ungut County) (Note: As Ungut District of Germi County at the 2006, 2011, and 2016 censuses)
Administrative Divisions	2006	2011	2016
Angut-e Gharbi RD	12,806	11,855	10,721
Angut-e Sharqi RD	9,532	8,207	6,969
Pain Barzand RD (Note: Transferred to the Central District of Germi County after the 2016 census)	3,600	3,088	2,557
Angut (city)	1,556	2,544	2,645
Total	27,494	25,694	22,892
RD = Rural District
