= Ungut County =

County in Ardabil province, Iran

Ungut County Persian: شهرستان انگوت
- County
- Location of Ungut County in Ardabil province (top, green)

- Location of Ardabil province in Iran
- Coordinates: 39°01′N 47°43′E
- Country: Iran
- Province: Ardabil
- Established: 2019
- Capital: Angut
- Districts: Central, Darrehrud

Area
  - Total: 1,048 km^{2} (405 sq mi)
- Time zone: UTC+3:30 (IRST)

Ungut County (Persian: شهرستان انگوت) (Note: Azerbaijani: Üngüt Şəhəri) is in Ardabil province, Iran. Its capital is the city of Angut, (Note: Formerly Tazeh Kand-e Angut) whose population at the time of the 2016 National Census was 2,645 in 717 households.

== History ==
In 2019, Ungut District (Note: Renamed the Central District of Ungut County) was separated from Germi County (Note: Formerly Moghan County) in the establishment of Ungut County and renamed the Central District. The new county was divided into two districts of two rural districts each, with Angut as its capital and only city at the time.

== Demographics ==
=== Administrative divisions ===
Ungut County's administrative structure is shown in the following table.

Ungut County
Administrative Divisions
Central District
Angut-e Gharbi RD
Angut-e Sharqi RD
Angut (city)
Darrehrud District
Darrehrud-e Jonubi RD
Darrehrud-e Shomali RD
RD = Rural District
