= Germi County =

County in Ardabil province, Iran

Germi County Persian: شهرستان گرمی
- County
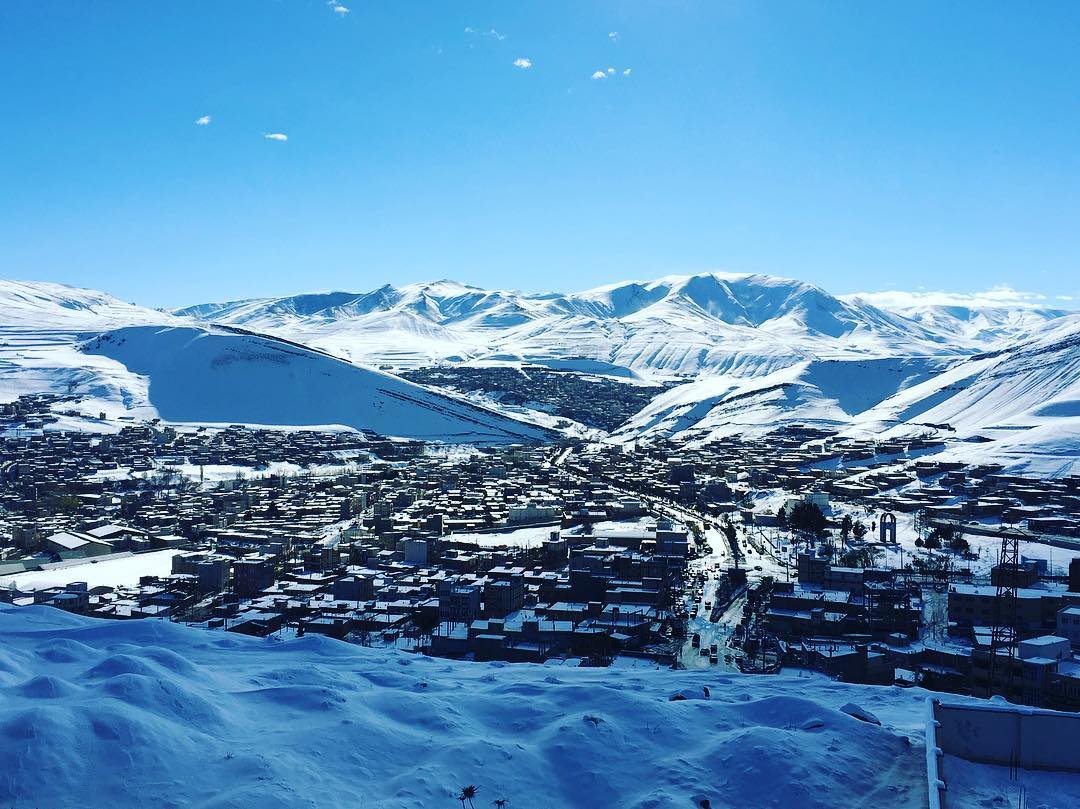
- Winter landscape in Germi

- Location of Germi County in Ardabil province (center right, yellow)

- Location of Ardabil province in Iran
- Coordinates: 39°02′N 48°03′E
- Country: Iran
- Province: Ardabil
- Capital: Germi
- Districts: Central, Muran

Area
  - Total: 2,793 km^{2} (1,078 sq mi)

Population (2016)
  - Total: 76,901
  - Density: 27.53/km^{2} (71.31/sq mi)
- Time zone: UTC+3:30 (IRST)

Germi County (Persian: شهرستان گرمی) (Note: Formerly Moghan County (شهرستان مغان)) is in the northern part of Ardabil province, Iran. Its capital is the city of Germi, 110 km (68 mi) from Ardabil, the capital of the province.

== Etymology ==
The etymology of "Germi" is somewhat cryptic. The earliest book or document written about this area dates back to year 22 Hijri (about 671 AD in the Gregorian calendar) when Arab soldiers entered the Aran (or Alan) region. It is believed that before the Islamic era, Alans people were living in this area. Words such as Alania, Allan-shahr, Alan-shahr, and Alan-shah had been used initially during the first century AD, for this district was located between Azerbaijan, Shirvan, the Caspian Sea and Armenia. Many Alan people migrated from this area after the Islamic era and were replaced by Muslim people from different ethnic groups. After that, the area between those four borders was known as Mugan or Amukan and other pronunciations of these names.

Many historians believe the word "Germi" has Parthian or Alanian stems. Many others suggest that ritual words stem from religions such as Mithraism.

There are two theories that believe Germi is the combination of two words: Ger and mi, but there are different interpretations. One group believes that the Sumerian stem of "Ger" means village and "Mi" means celestial. The other group believes that "Ger" comes from "Ager" in ancient Persian, which became "Akhgar" in the modern Persian language, and "mi" comes from "mehr" or "Mitra" which both means "Sun", so "Germi" would mean fireplace of sun. This interpretation is more consistent with other documents and evidence about the region and its history.

== History ==
The history of county is closely related to the history of the Mugan region. The history of Mugan is divided into 4 eras.

=== First: The ancient era ===
There are enormous works from the ancient period in this era but there is not a complete museum about the region. Most of the ancient monuments discovered from the region, irrespective of the historical period, are held in several museums, such as The Iranian National Museum, The Kashan museum, The Copenhagen museum, and several others.

=== Second: The Parthian and Sassanian era ===
There are several stunning works from this era, such as daughter-castle in the north of the county, Langan Qantas, Barzand Castle.

=== Third: The early years of Islam to the Safavid dynasty ===
This era was not a flourishing period for the Mugan region. Due to the long period of wars, there were not any sign of progress, buildings, or outstanding monuments. The historical place in this county that had a large value during this era was Barzand Castle. That was the castle of Afshin who battled with Babak Khorramdin in an earlier century of Islamic history.

=== Fourth: The New Age (1734 AD to the present) ===
Ignoring the three earlier historical periods, Germi city is relatively new by Iranian standards; it was established around the year 900 of the Islamic calendar when Shah Ismael allowed five Shia families to migrate to this region. There were some other places and cities in Azerbaijan of I.R. Iran and Azerbaijan that are also called Germi.

=== Administrative changes ===
The village of Zahra was elevated to the status of a city in 2018. In 2019, Pain Barzand Rural District was separated from Ungut District to join the Central District, and Ungut District was separated from the county in the establishment of Ungut County.

== Demographics ==
=== Language ===
Almost all of the people of this county are Shia Muslim and speak Azeri. According to the book: "Investigating the Social Structure of Shahsavan Tribe" the first time that Turk tribes enter into the Mugan will mark the return to the era of Sultan Mahmud Ghaznavi successors in the fifth century. In the seventh century, the Tatar tribes overcome the Turkmens and threw them from the area.

=== Population ===
At the time of the 2006 National Census, the county's population was 89,248 in 18,710 households. The following census in 2011 counted 84,267 people in 21,156 households. The 2016 census measured the population of the county as 76,901 in 22,349 households.

=== Administrative divisions ===
Germi County's population history and administrative structure over three consecutive censuses are shown in the following table.

Germi County Population
Administrative Divisions	2006	2011	2016
Central District	48,790	47,449	43,990
Ani RD	6,251	5,421	4,364
Ojarud-e Gharbi RD	7,849	7,775	6,523
Ojarud-e Markazi RD	2,301	1,772	1,304
Ojarud-e Shomali RD	4,041	3,528	2,832
Pain Barzand RD			
Germi (city)	28,348	28,953	28,967
Muran District	12,964	11,124	10,019
Azadlu RD	4,720	4,197	3,855
Ojarud-e Sharqi RD	8,244	6,927	6,164
Zahra (city) (Note: Became a city after the 2016 census)			
Ungut District (Note: Transferred to Ungut County and renamed the Central District)	27,494	25,694	22,892
Angut-e Gharbi RD	12,806	11,855	10,721
Angut-e Sharqi RD	9,532	8,207	6,969
Pain Barzand RD	3,600	3,088	2,557
Tazeh Kand-e Angut (city) (Note: Renamed Angut)	1,556	2,544	2,645
Total	89,248	84,267	76,901
RD = Rural District

== Climate and geography ==
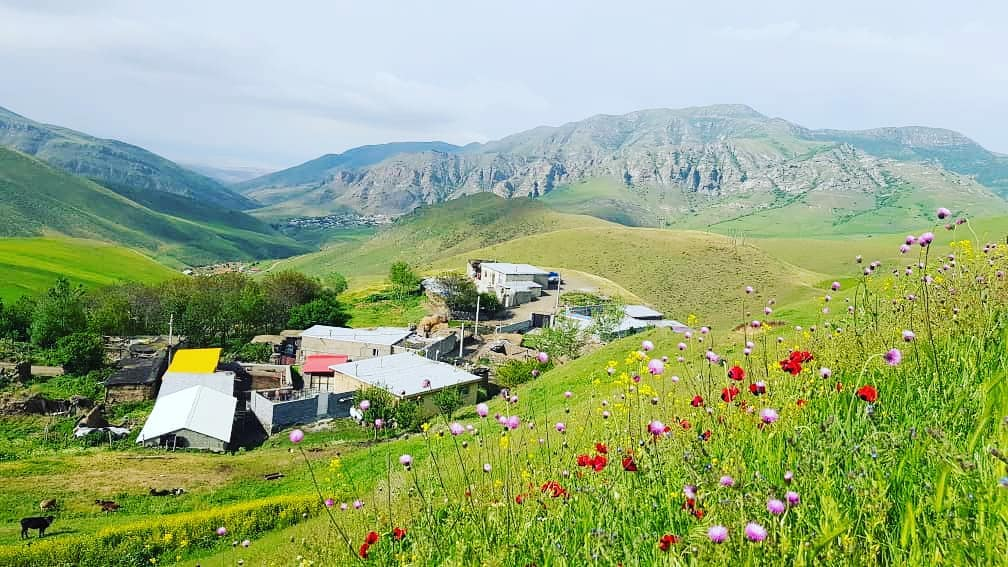
Khan Kandi, Germi village

The city's area is almost 1,725 square kilometers. The altitude varies between 250 meters in the village of Khan Mohammad loo in the northwest, up to 2,200 meters in the southeast, where the Salavat Mountains are located.

The Moghan (Germi) region, due to its specific topographic conditions, has a different climate than other parts of Azerbaijan, or even its southern regions. The county has almost a Mediterranean climate.

Monsoon winds called Caspian Winds, which come from the Caspian Sea, greatly increase the cooling rate of the region. The distance between the Moghan (Germi) region and the Caspian Sea is about 80 to 90 km. In general, despite the region's proximity to the sea, when considering the climatic division, this region can be considered as semi-arid, as the annual rainfall is less than 500 mm. The warm summer heat It is humid, and the region has a moderate winter. The winters are usually accompanied by cold, frosty, and foggy winds. Average monthly temperature range from −1 to 31 °C (30 to 88 °F).

=== Vegetation ===
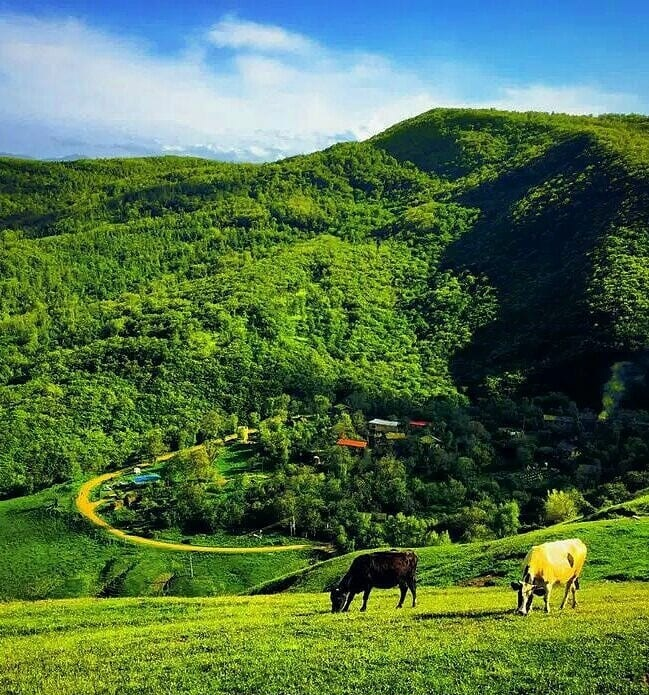
Afcheh Village in Germi County

The range of lands and forests of the county are populated with different types of plants, trees and shrubs among the varieties of elm, oak, figs, mountain plums, hawthorn, apple, barberry, raspberries, sweetbrier, tamarisk, pine species and a variety of medicinal plants such as licorice, Styphnolobium japonicum, Malva sylvestris, spearmint, Echium, chamomile, yarrow, saffron Mountain, wilted sorrel, Rumex crispus, wild rue, Sorrel, Mountain tea and some other plants.

Iran has 3,400,000 hectares of national forest land, of which 5,000 hectares are located in this county. 3,000 hectares are in the central part of the county, and 2,000 hectares are in the Angoutian region.

Tulips, lily of the valley, varieties of jasmine, gladiolus, violas and some other flowers grow up throughout the different seasons and in the different parts of the county.

=== Precipitation, springs, rivers and qanats ===
The average yearly precipitation of county is 460 mm (18.1 in). This differs across the county: minimum precipitation is in the north-west in Khan-Mohammad-loo village at 250 mm, while maximum rainfall is at Dash-dibi village in south-east at 700mm.

There are 69 permanent fountains in the city, which puts it in the 4th rank of the province.

The county has seven permanent rivers, but their water level varies between 10 million cubic meters to 1 billion cubic meters. The largest river of the county is Dareroud; The valley of the river originates from the slopes of Mount Sabalan and joins Aras river on the northern border of I.R. Iran passing through the counties of Ardabil, Meshkin-Shahr, Germi and Bilesuvar and joining several rivers along the route. This river is the largest internal river of Ardabil province.

Balhary/Bulgary/Balharood is another important river in the county. Part of the river's route helps to form the border between Iran and Azerbaijan.

== Economy ==
While trade was the most important reason for the emergence and development of the city of Germi, The economy of the Germi region is primarily based on agriculture and animal husbandry, then public services, government services and commerce.

Other services, as well as industry and mining, have a very small share in the region's economy.

According to national development standards, Ardabil province is one of the less-developed provinces in Iran, and this province, Germi, is in 6th place for development.

=== Agriculture ===
The main agricultural product of the county is cereals. All of the above-mentioned conditions allow farmers to reach sufficient yields while growing cereals. The cereal yield often exceeds that from provinces of Iran such as Yazd and Hormozgan. Wheat production from Germi measures to approximately 70,000 metric tonnes to 140,000 metric tonnes per year.

Nectarine, pomegranate, peach, quince, apple, walnut, fig, cherry, sour cherry, plum, berry, and blackberry are the main fruits of the county. The main garden product of Germi is nectarine, which exceeds 2,500 metric tons of yield per year. While the whole of Iranian nectarine production exceeds 1.1 million tonnes, Germi has the best per hectare yield of nectarine by more than 40 tonnes per hectare.

Live animals, red meat, dairy products and poultry are among the other important products of region.

=== Industry ===
Germi has two state-approved industrial towns as well as some small and large factories outside of industrial towns. Building materials, as well as valves and some consumer goods, are the industrial products of the region. The production of valves is the most important part of industrial production in the city, and entrepreneurs are rapidly developing the valve industry in the city.

== See also ==
Media related to Germi County at Wikimedia Commons
