= Emamzadeh Abdollah =

Emamzadeh Abdollah (Persian: امامزاده عبدالله) may refer to:

- Emamzadeh Abdollah, Ardabil
- Emamzadeh Abdollah, Golestan
- Emamzadeh Abdollah, Hamadan
- Emamzadeh Abdollah, Isfahan
- Emamzadeh Abdollah, Khuzestan
- Emamzadeh Abdollah, Andika, Khuzestan province
- Emamzadeh Abdollah, Markazi
- Emamzadeh Abdollah, Mazandaran
- Emamzadeh Abdollah, Komijan, Markazi province
- Emamzadeh Abdollah, Aradan, Semnan province
- Emamzadeh Abdollah, Sorkheh, Semnan province
- Emamzadeh Abdollah, Tehran
- Emamzadeh Abdollah Rural District, in Mazandaran province
