= 100,000 rial note =

Iranian banknote

The one hundred thousand rial or ten thousand toman note is a common rial banknote in Iran. This note was issued in Iranian banks on 2010.

== Specifications ==
The ten thousand toman note is made of olive green cotton paper, measuring 79 x 166 mm, and for the first time in Iran, two strands of security thread have been used in it. It is sufficiently resistant to factors such as water, detergents, tearing, double folding, and stretching. If used properly, its actual lifespan is estimated to be between 7 and 8 years.

=== Obverse ===
Like other current banknotes, the ten thousand toman note features the image of Ayatollah Khomeini, and on its right side is a mosaic image of the Yazd Grand Mosque, which is made of Islamic motifs.

=== Reverse ===
On the back of this banknote is a picture of Saadi's tomb and the famous verse:

بنی‌آدم اعضای یک دیگرند که در آفرینش ز یک گوهرند

It is from Saadi's Bustan, printed in Nastaliq script with its English translation as "In creation of one essence and soul/ Human beings are members of a whole." There is also a mihrab on the back of Saadi's tomb, the design of which is taken from the mosaic work at the entrance to the Red Dome of Maragheh. The design of this banknote also uses the stucco molding of Imamzadeh Abdullah, known as the Chinese knot, and other moldings from the courtyard of Imam Reza's shrine. Original Iranian carpet motifs are used on the upper part of the back of the banknote, on the left side in the transverse sections, and on its lower edge. Parts of this banknote, including Khomeini's portrait, the border and writings on the banknote, and Saadi's tomb, the border and writings on the back of the banknote, are embossed, and the relief of these surfaces can be easily felt with the fingers compared to other prints.

=== Security features ===
This banknote has three levels of security, the first level of which can be recognized by the general public through security threads and watermarks. At other levels, the security features of this banknote can be recognized by bank officials and experts using a tool such as a UV lamp device, and at the third stage, only Central Bank experts are able to recognize its security levels. The inclusion of a three-dimensional image of Ayatollah Khomeini as a watermark in this banknote and the number 100,000 rials in Latin under his portrait are other security features. Two types of security threads are used in this banknote, one of which is a window thread and a hologram type and is 2.5 mm long and has the Central Bank logo in the middle of it. The other security thread is hidden and made of polyester with a width of one millimeter in the middle of the paper and with the Central Bank written on it, visible under ultraviolet radiation in three colors: green, blue, and red. Another security feature of this banknote is the presence of invisible fluorescent fibers in the paper pulp, which are visible under ultraviolet radiation in four colors: green, yellow, blue, and red.

Largest denomination of Iran
| Preceded by 50,000 rials note | 100,000 rials note 2010–present | Incumbent |
