= Architecture of Tehran =

Iranian architecture

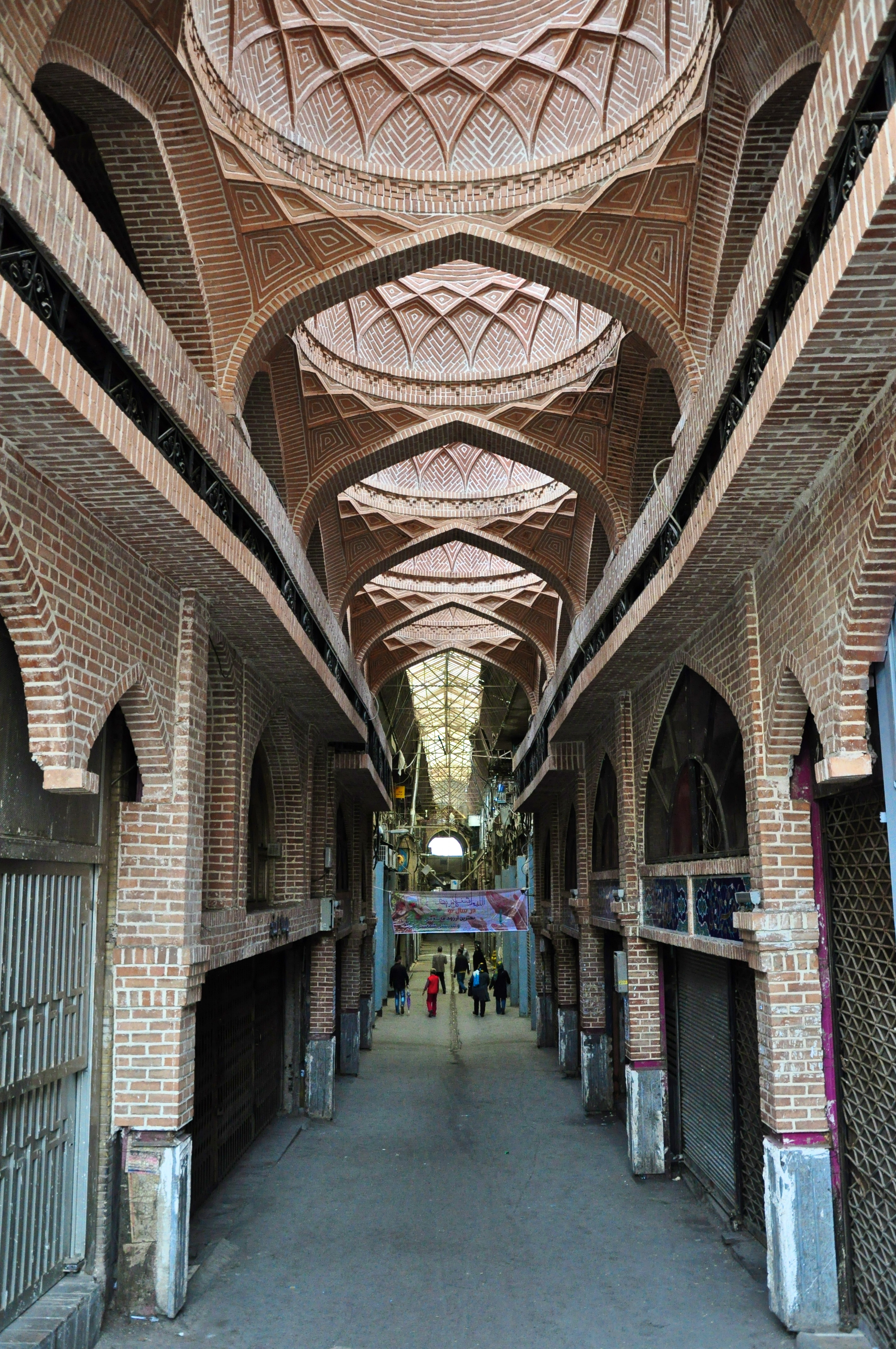
Tehran's Grand Bazaar

Tehran has grown dramatically since Agha Mohammad Khan Qajar chose it as the capital of the Qajar dynasty in 1796. Despite the occurrence of earthquakes during and before the Qajar era, some buildings still remain from Tehran's era of antiquity. However, most of Tehran's historic architecture has been obliterated by a wave of hasty modernisation that has swept the capital over the last 40 to 50 years. Of the eight city gates of old Tehran, none remain today. Qajar culture flowered into a mature form of vernacular architecture, and many relics today remain of this tradition. Most, however, are government offices and residences of the elite. The Ahmad Shahi Pavilion and Sahebgharaniyeh Palace in the Niavaran Palace Complex are examples of this tradition.

Many of the urban designs of modern Tehran are attributed to Victor Gruen. Gruen devised a master plan for many of northern Tehran's neighborhoods between 1963 and 1967. Many palaces were built and by the late 1970s, Tehran had grown so large that Ray, a former satellite and city in itself, became connected to the ever-expanding "Greater Tehran". Pahlavi architecture tried incorporated themes from European Modern architecture. The "White House" of Sa'dabad Palace Complex and the main Niavaran Palace are examples of this architectural style.

Features of the city include gates and palaces. Despite the chaotic sprawl of Tehran, many designers are gradually incorporating aesthetics in their designs, and international awards have been given to projects in the city.

== See also ==
- Ferdows Garden
- Goldis Tower
- Iranian architecture
- List of tallest buildings in Tehran
- Sharifi-ha House
- Tehran International Tower
