= 20,000 rial note =

Denomination of Iranian currency

Twenty thousand rials
- Country: Iran
- Value: 20,000 rials
- Width: 163 mm
- Height: 78 mm
- Weight: ≈ 1 g
- Security features: Security fluorescent fibers, watermark, security thread, intaglio micro printing, latent image, see-through image
- Material used: 100% cotton
- Years of printing: Since 2003; 23 years ago

Obverse

Reverse

The twenty thousand rial or two thousand toman note is one of the most common banknotes in the Islamic Republic of Iran, which has been in circulation since 2003.

== Specifications ==
The banknote is colored blue and green, measured to be 163 mm wide and 78 mm high, made entirely out of cotton and has a 1.5 mm wide metallized security thread. Fluorescent fibers are also used in the pulp.

The twenty thousand rial note is printed using dry offset printing and has a letterpress serial number that turns gold when exposed to ultraviolet light. Parts of this note are embossed. This note also has a raised mark for the blind.

=== Obverse ===
Ayatollah Khomeini's image on the right side in raised print. The three-dimensional design of Ayatollah Khomeini's image is printed on the left side of the paper stock, and underneath it is the number 50,000, clearly visible against the light from both sides of the banknote. A holographic window security thread with a width of two and a half millimeters with the logo of the Central Bank of the Islamic Republic of Iran, on which the color change in the surfaces of the design inserted on it will be visible with a slight change in the angle of light. The colorless number 20000 is included in its text, which is easily visible against the light.

=== Reverse ===
The twenty thousand rial note has had three design changes since it was first issued in 2003. The first design on the back of this banknote was the Naghsh-e Jahan Square in Isfahan, and around 2008, Al-Aqsa Mosque was considered as another design for this banknote, and in the third series, it shows the windbreaker of the Aghazadeh Mansion (Abarkooh). The new twenty thousand rial note has no changes compared to the old design in terms of security features. The design of the incomplete image, the hidden image, the security thread, the watermark on the right side of the note, the raised image on it, the small writings on the note that can be seen with a loupe or magnifying devices, the fluorescent nature of the number, and some parts of the design on the front and back of the note remain unchanged. Under ultraviolet light, parts of this banknote appear phosphorescent.

== Bibliography ==
- "Security Features of 20,000 Rials Banknote". Central Bank of Iran. 2015.

Largest denomination of Iran
Preceded by 10,000 rials note	20,000 rials note 2003–2007	Succeeded by 50,000 rials note
