= Ali Kaveh =

Iranian photojournalist

- علی کاوه
- Ali Kaveh in 2019
- Born: 1946 (age 79–80); Amol, Iran
- Occupation: Photographer

Ali Kaveh (born 1946 in Amol) is an Iranian photojournalist.

He started his professional career when he was 15, and covered many international major events. 1973 International Wrestling Championship in Tehran was the first International sports event covered by him. Ali Kaveh has also attended 1974 Asian Games in Tehran, 1976 Olympic Games in Montreal, 1990 Asian Games in Beijing, EURO 1992 in Sweden, Atlanta 1996 Olympic Games and FIFA World Cup France 1998.

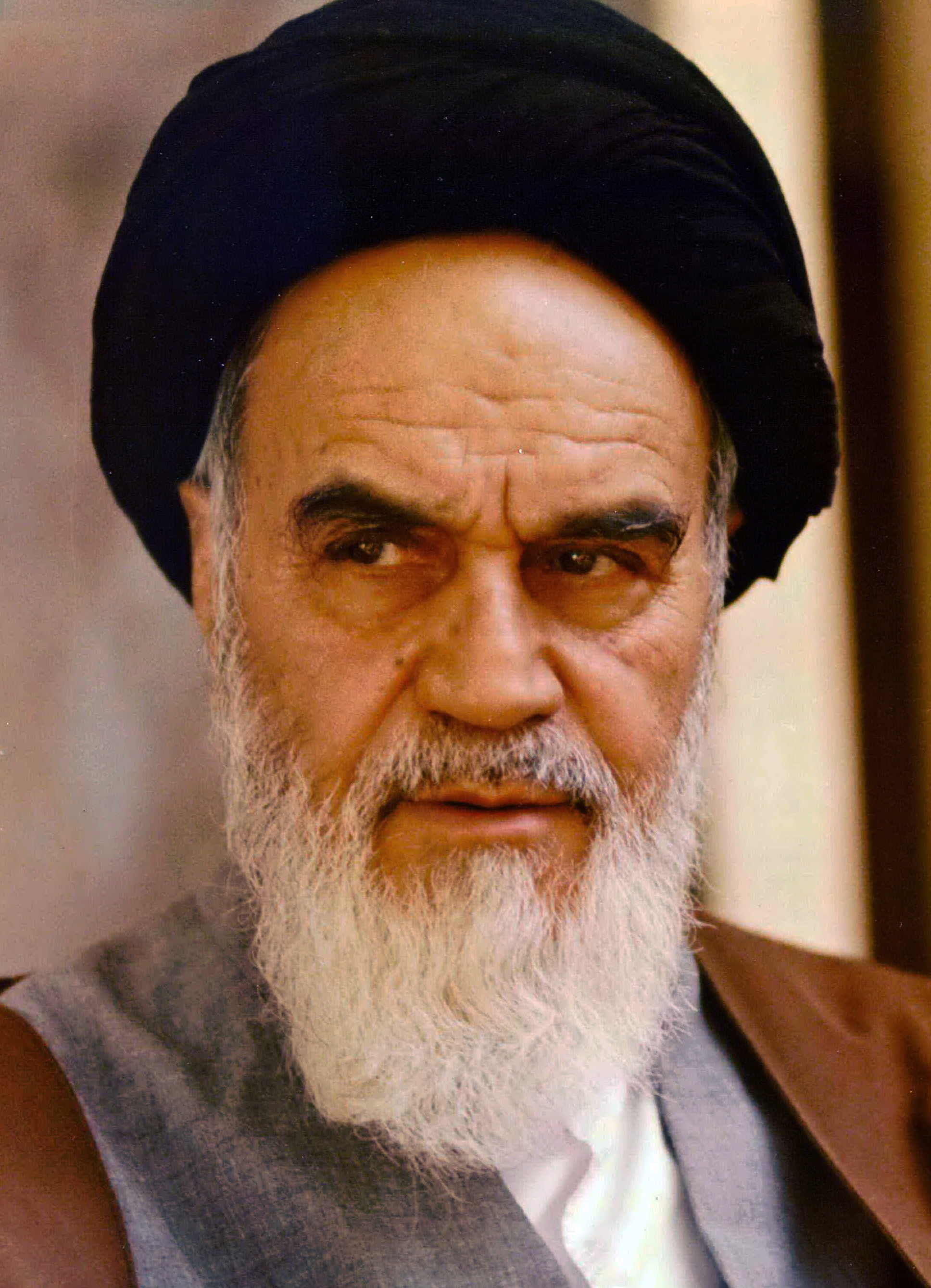
The portrait of Ruhollah Khomeini, which was taken by Kaveh in 1981

He is famous in Iran because he took the picture of Ayatollah Khomeini, which was printed on Iranian 10,000 rials note.

== Major events covered ==
- 1973 International Wrestling Championship
- Asian Games 1974 Tehran
- 1976 Summer Olympic Games Montreal
- 1990 Asian Games Beijing
- UEFA EURO 1992 Sweden
- 1996 Summer Olympic Games Atlanta
- 1998 FIFA World Cup France
