= Niavaran Palace =

Royal palace and former residence in Tehran, Iran

- کاخ نیاوران
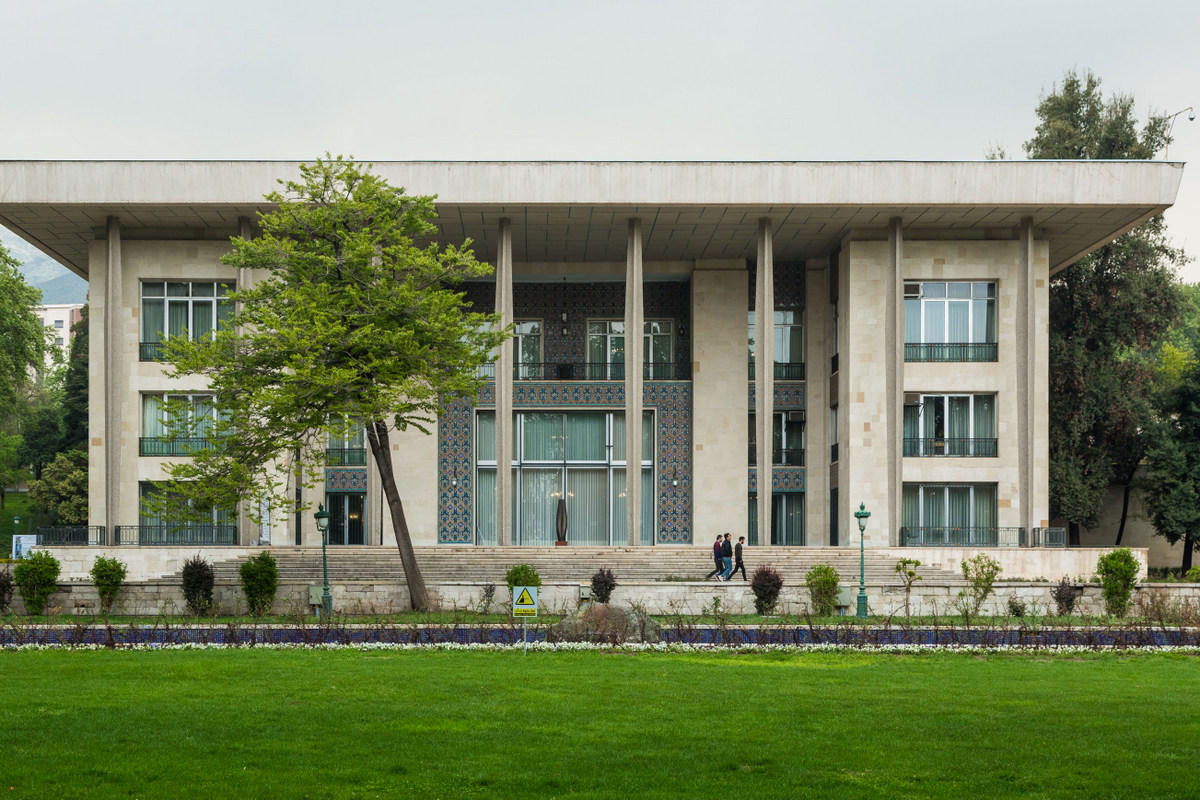
- The palace in 2018

- Location within Tehran
- Alternative names: Niavaran Mansion

General information
- Status: Completed
- Architectural style: International Style, Pahlavi architecture
- Location: Niavaran, Shemiran, Tehran, Iran
- Coordinates: 35°48′42.6″N 51°28′23.8″E
- Construction started: 1958
- Completed: 1967
- Closed: January 16, 1979 (as residence)
- Client: Mohammad Reza Pahlavi
- Owner: Pahlavi dynasty (former)

Height
- Height: 14 metres (46 ft)

Technical details
- Floor count: 2.5
- Floor area: 9,000 square metres (97,000 ft^{2})

Design and construction
- Architect: Mohsen Foroughi

Niavaran Palace (Persian: کاخ نیاوران, romanized: Kākh-e Niāvarān) is a royal palace, museum, and former residence of the Pahlavi dynasty in Tehran, Iran. The palace was completed in 1967 for Shah Mohammad Reza Pahlavi and his family. It is the newest, largest, and centerpiece property of the Niavaran Complex which the mansion is a part of.

== History ==
The Shah had been living in the Marble Palace that had been built by his father, but needed a larger residence for his family. Planning of a mansion that would be the official residence for the Shah and his family began in 1958. Mohsen Foroughi was the main architect behind the project. The future mansion would be built on the grounds of the Niavaran Complex which contains a garden and previously constructed Qajar palaces. Niavaran Palace was designed in the International Style and mixes European modern architecture with the traditional Iranian tilework and Pahlavi architecture. The entire palace is adorned with plasterwork, mirrors, and chandeliers.

The palace was built specifically for Mohammad Reza Pahlavi and his family which included his wife, Farah, and five kids. It was originally constructed for guests of the Shah, but Mohammad Reza Pahlavi chose it as his official residence. The Shah received guests inside the residence, including President Jimmy Carter.

Crown Prince Reza Pahlavi attended grade school inside the palace.

After construction interruptions, it was completed in 1967 and inhabited by the Pahlavi family from 1968 until their departure during the 1979 Iranian Revolution. It is one of the newest palaces in the world and serves as a museum, preserving the original state of the mansion as it was in 1979.

== Private library ==
The library was publicly inaugurated in 1994, on the occasion of International Museum Day.

=== Construction ===
The interior designing of the library was designed by architect Abdol-Aziz Mirza Farmanfarmaian.

=== Features ===
The building is allocated to libraries in three separate levels; the reading room, the main library, and the audio-visual room. Other sections of the library include sets of artwork, which number over 350. The works reflect parts of modern-art history, particularly the modern tendencies of Iranian art in the 1950s and 1960s.

=== Gallery ===
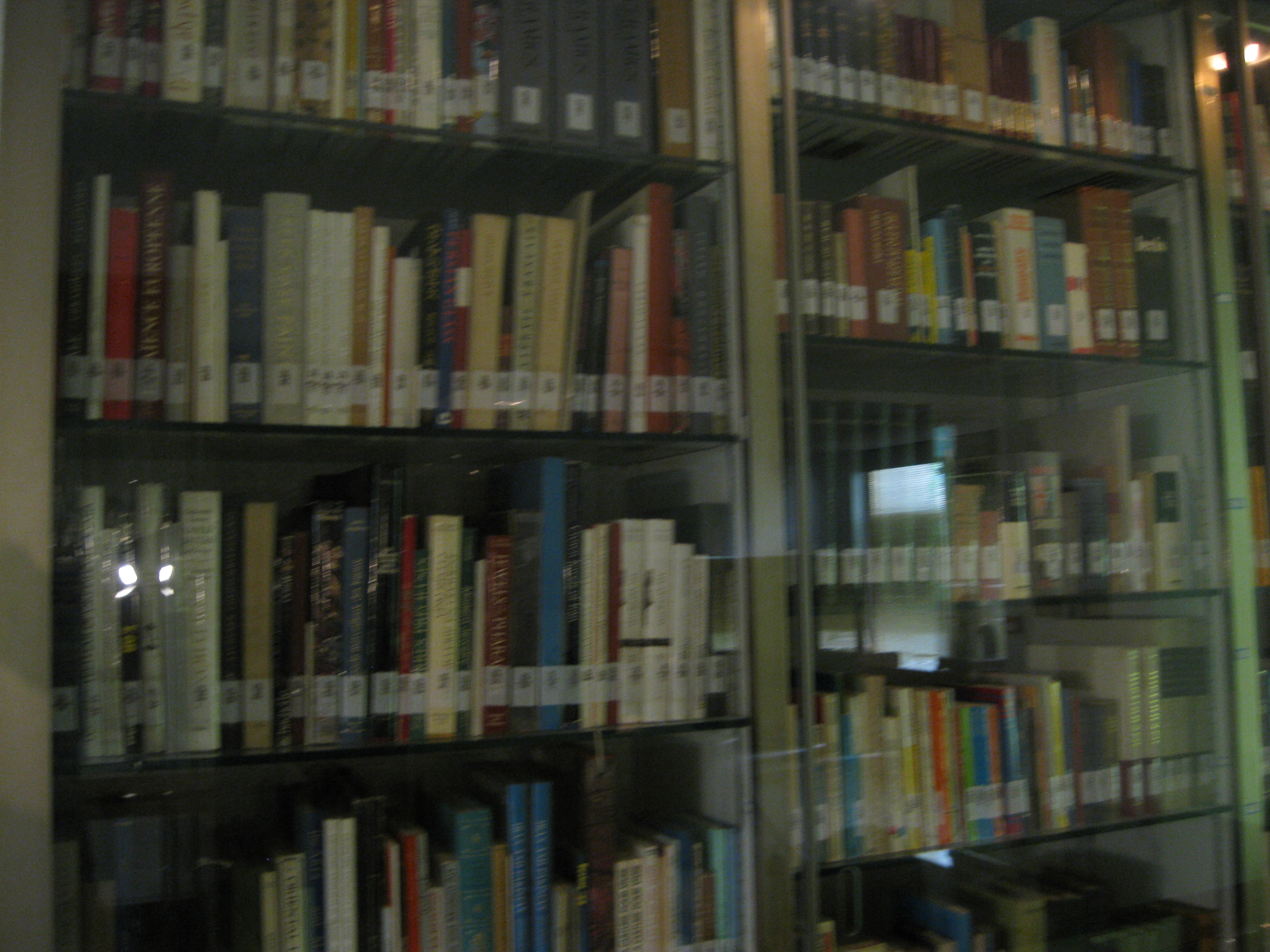
Books

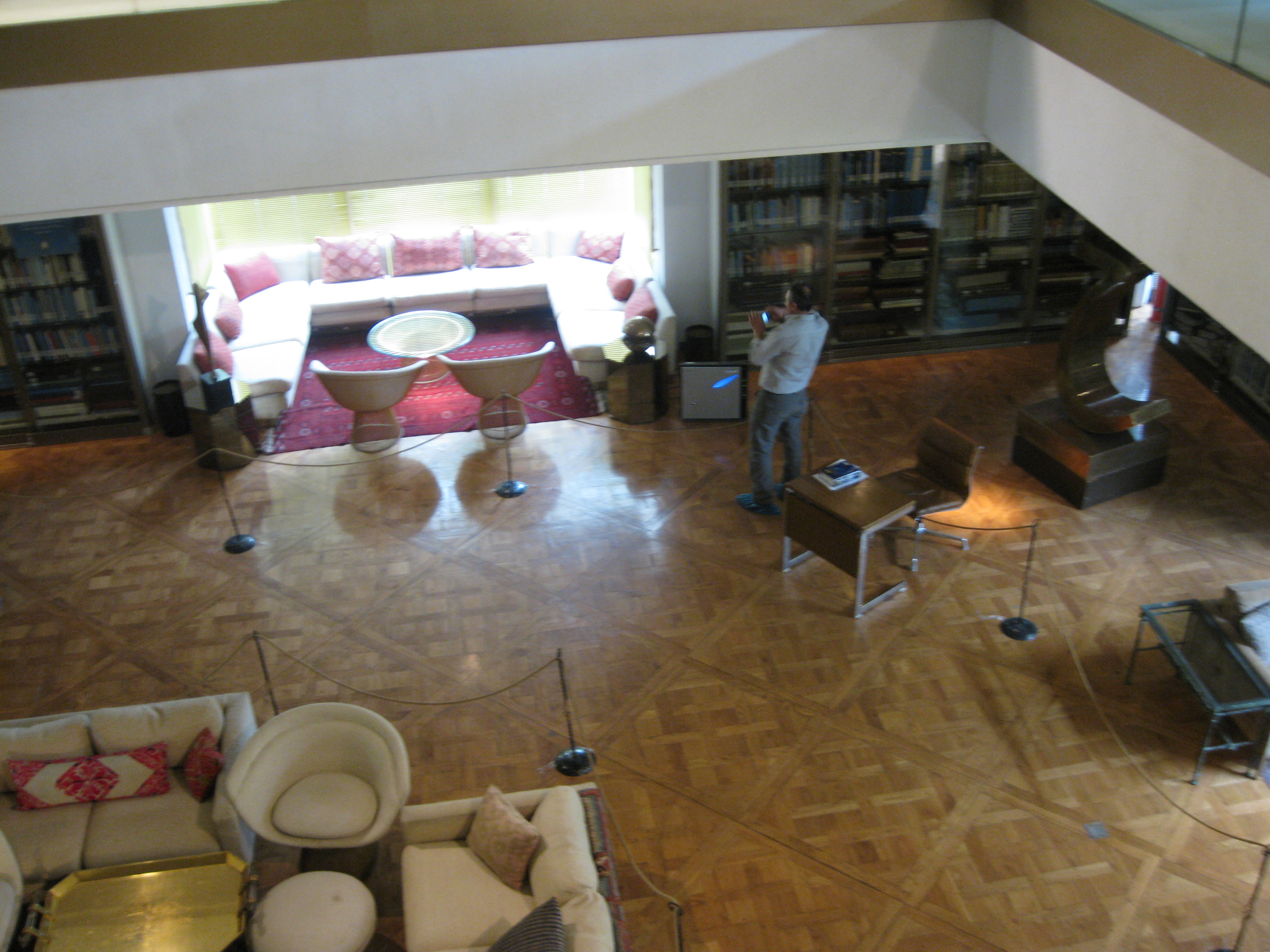
The first floor

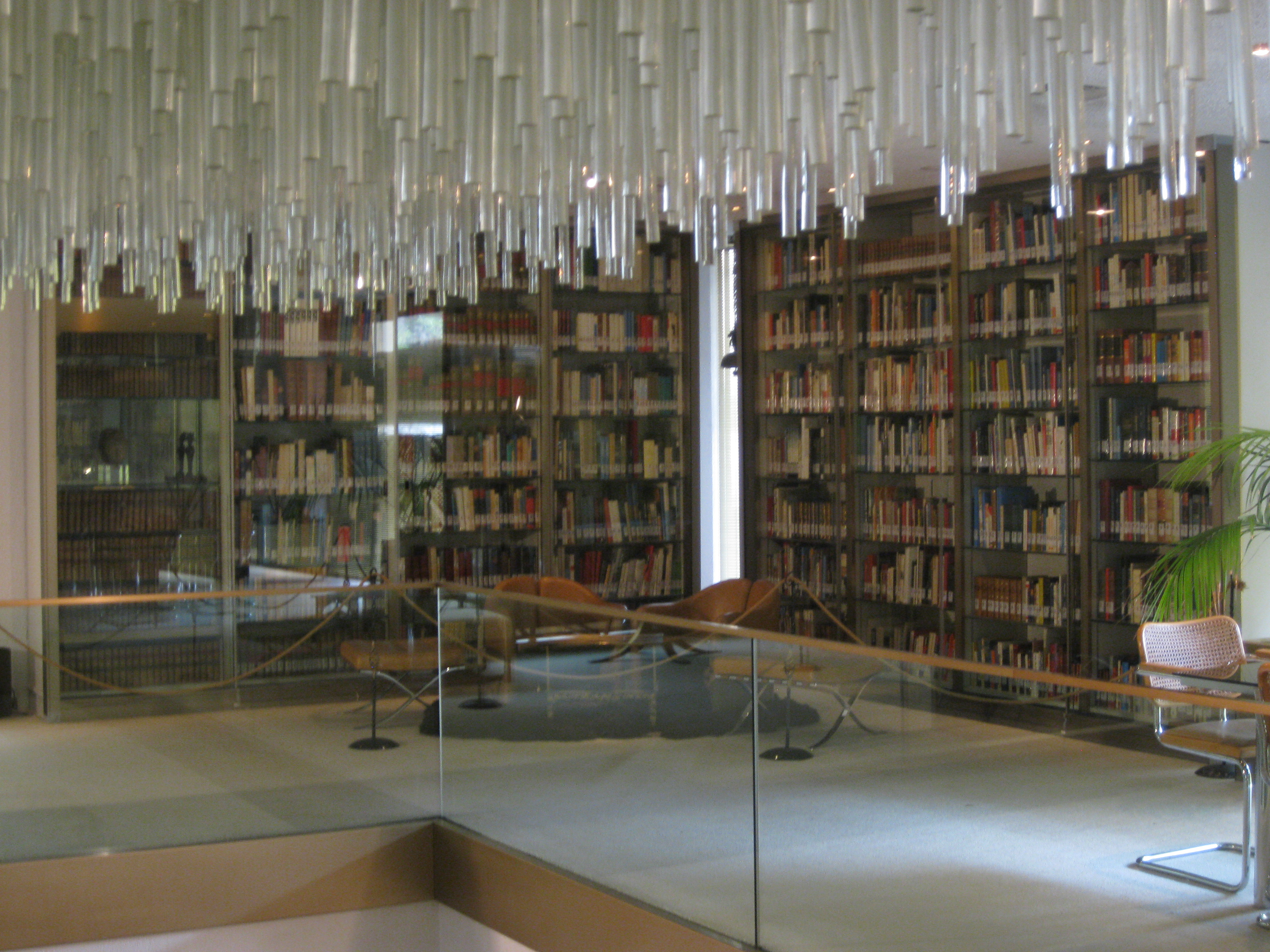
Book shelves and glassy cylindrical ceiling

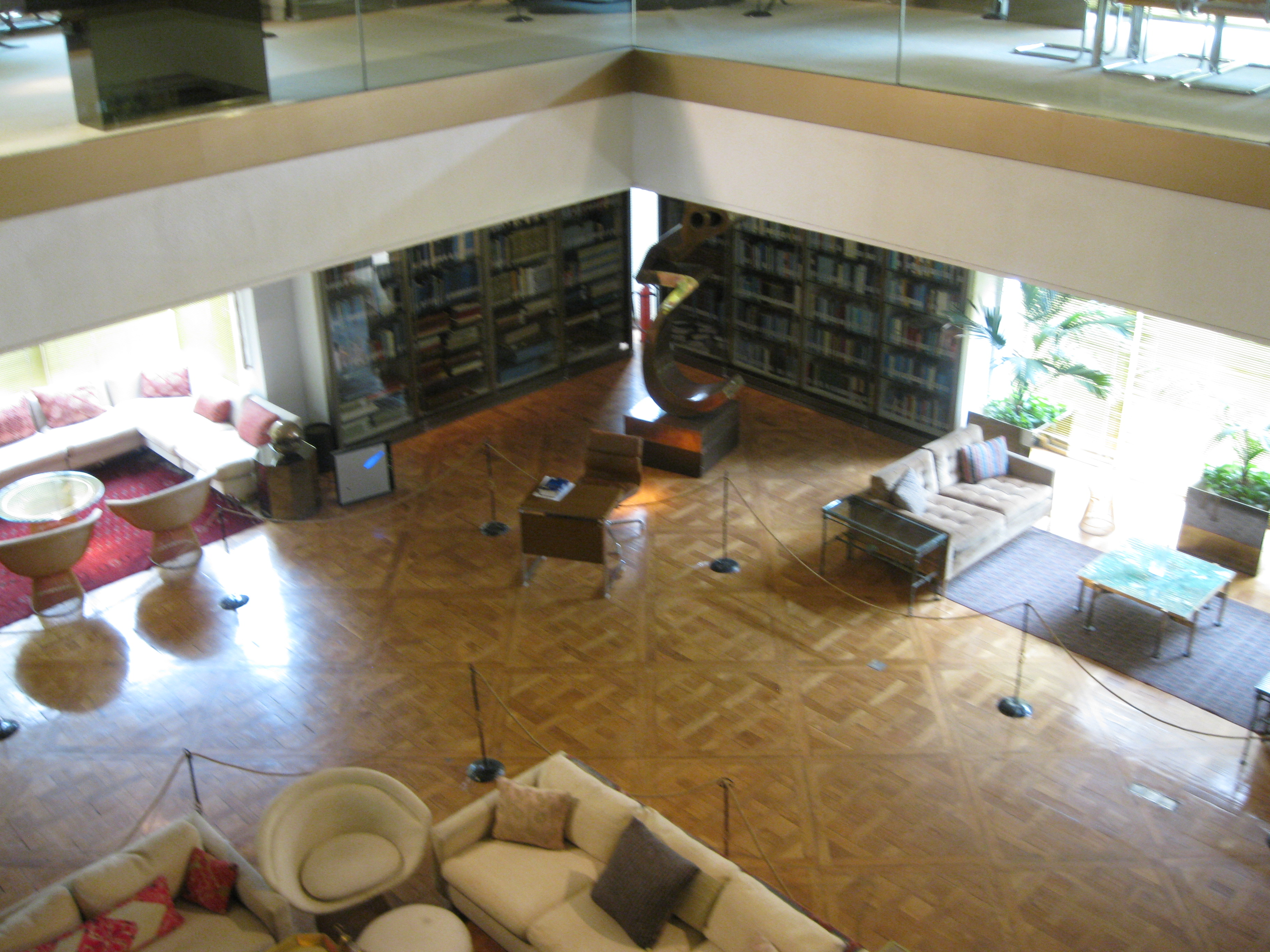
The first floor

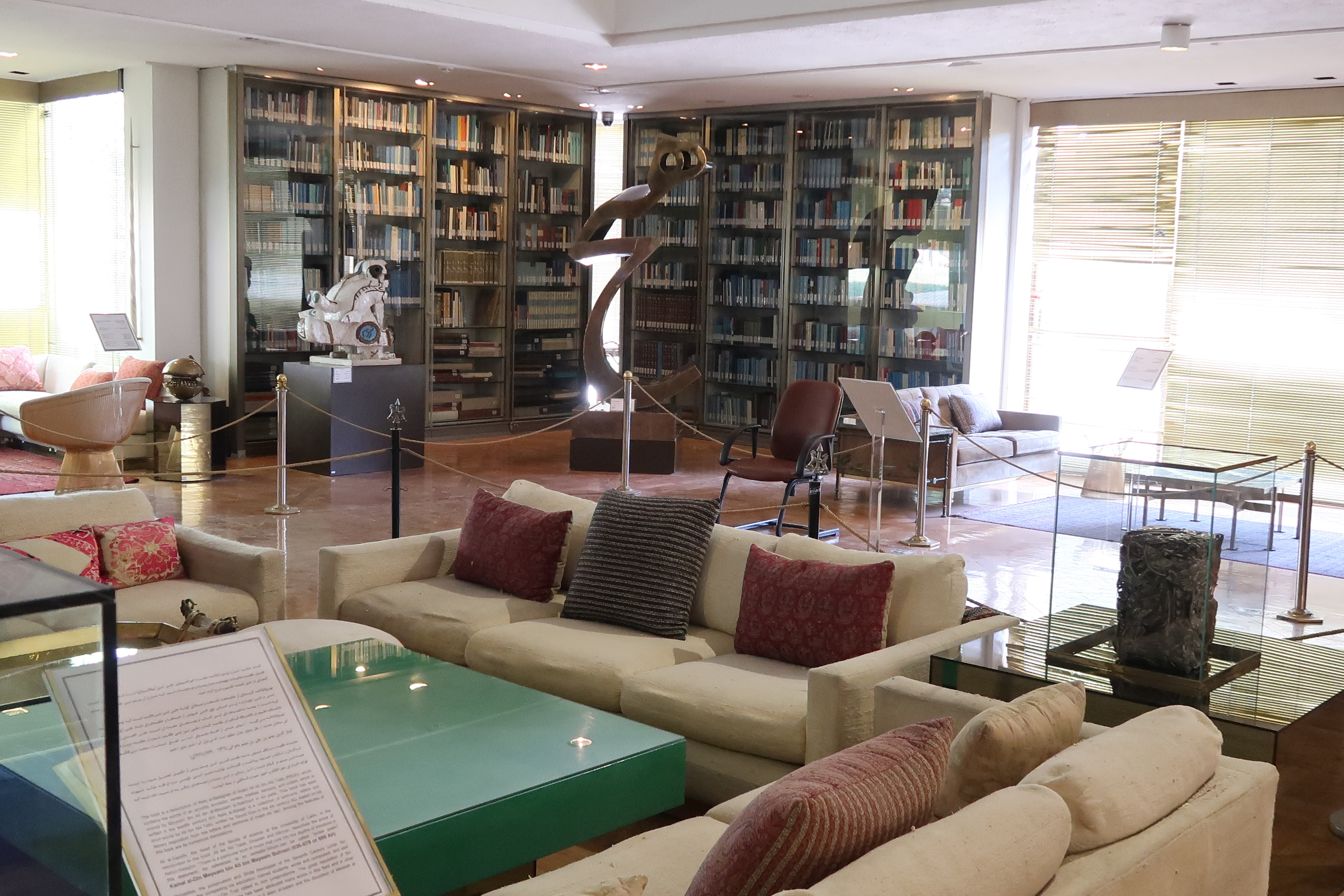
Another view of inside the library

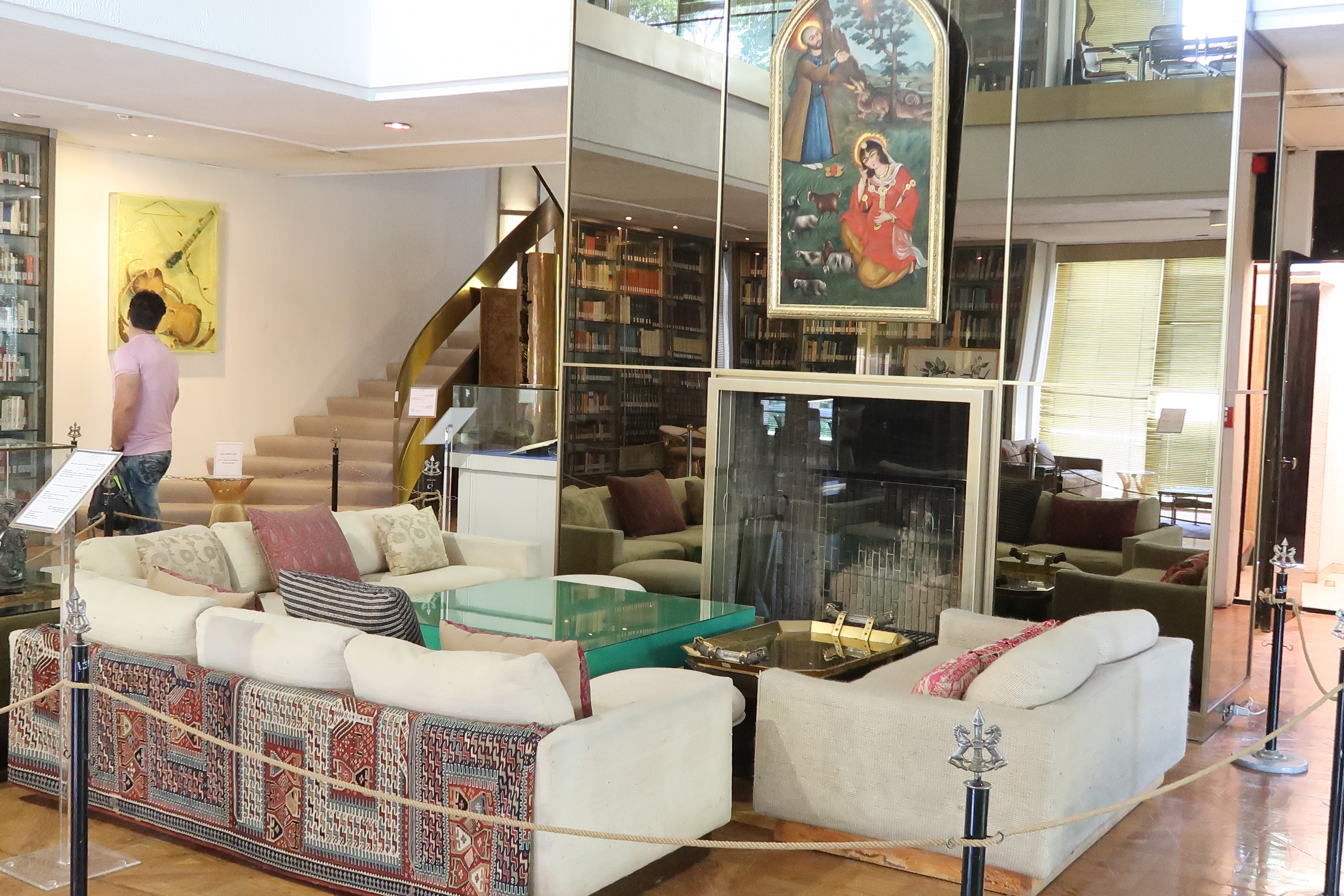
Another view of inside the library

== Gallery ==
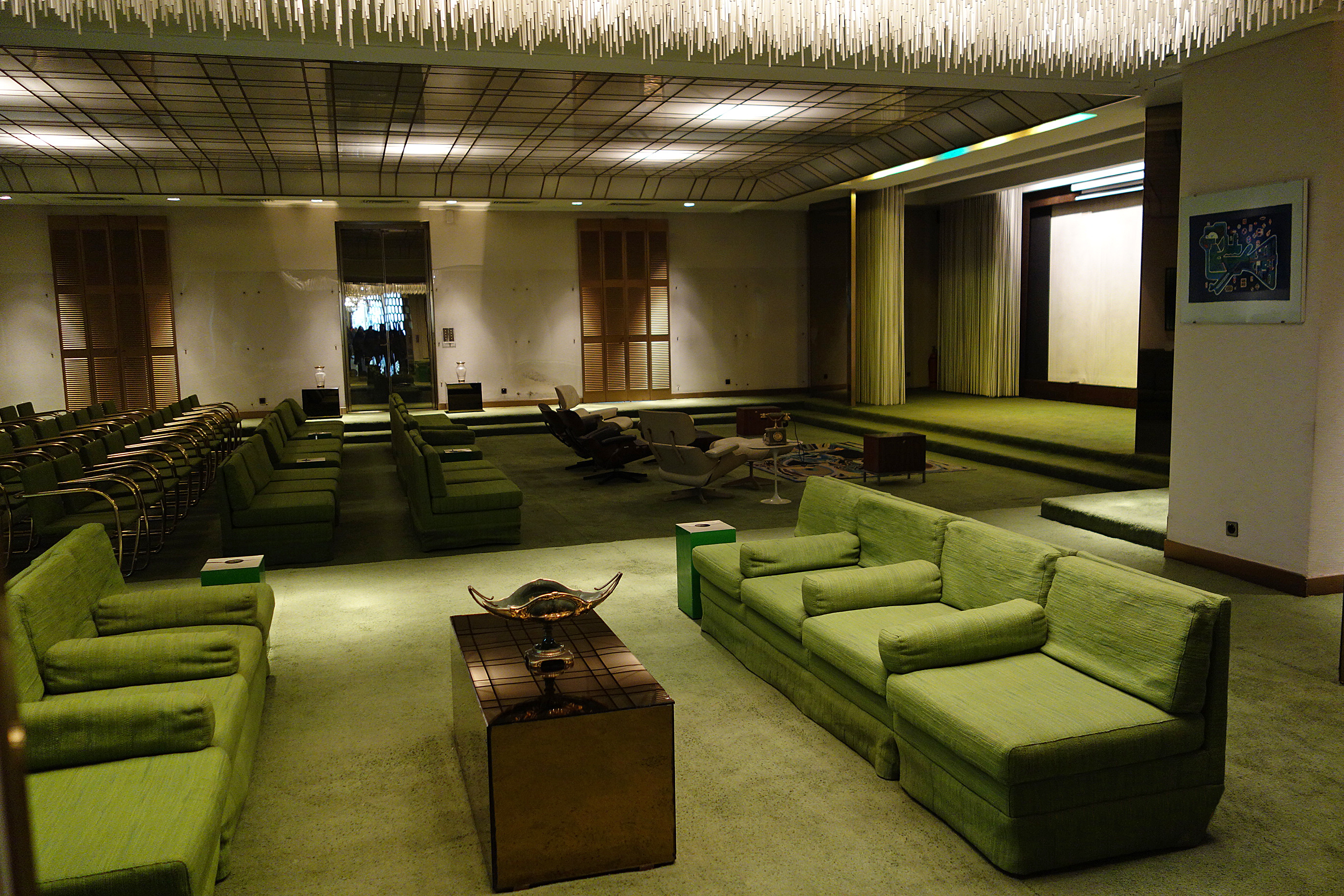
Cinema

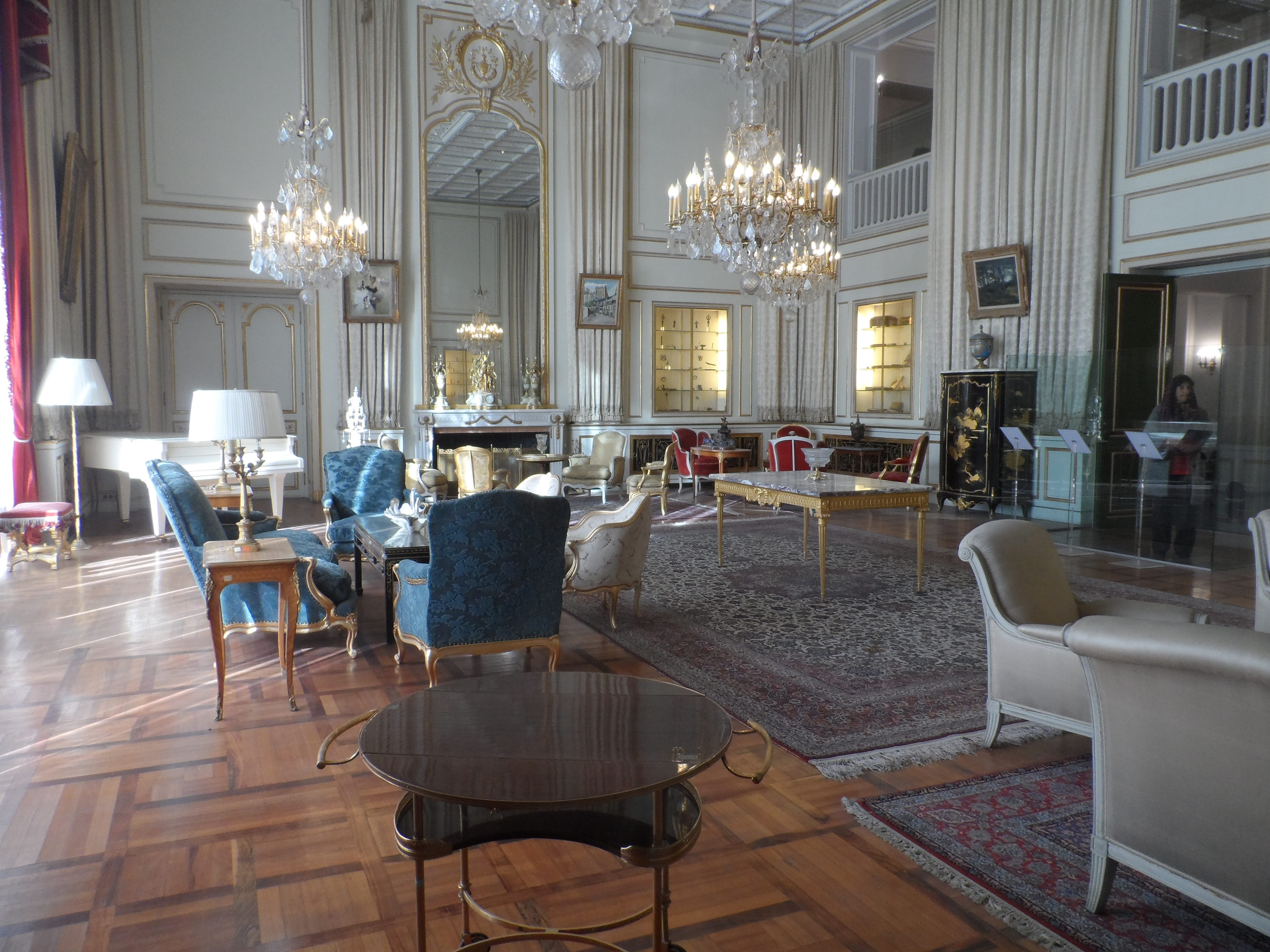
Reception room

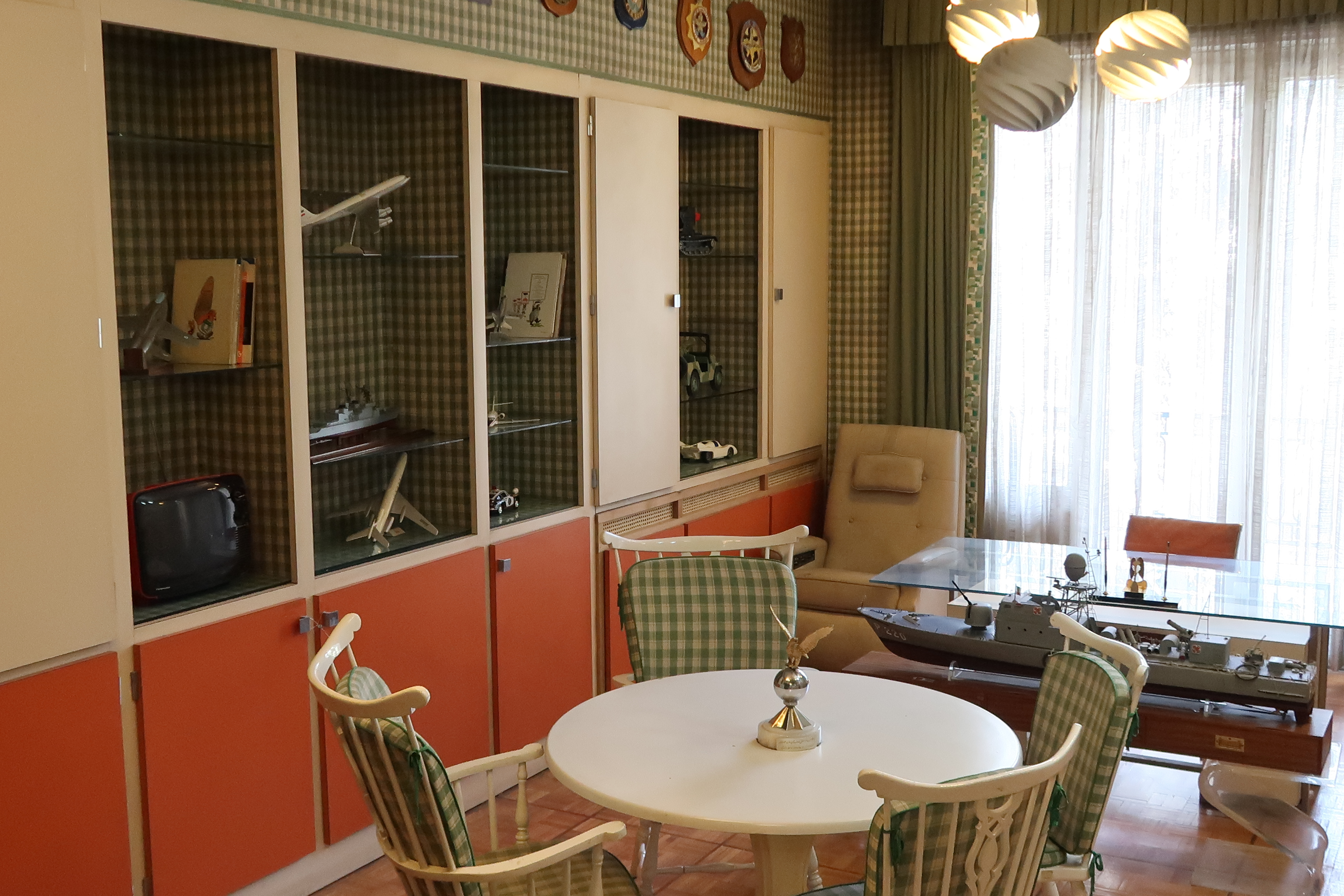
Room of Prince Ali Reza Pahlavi, son of the Shah

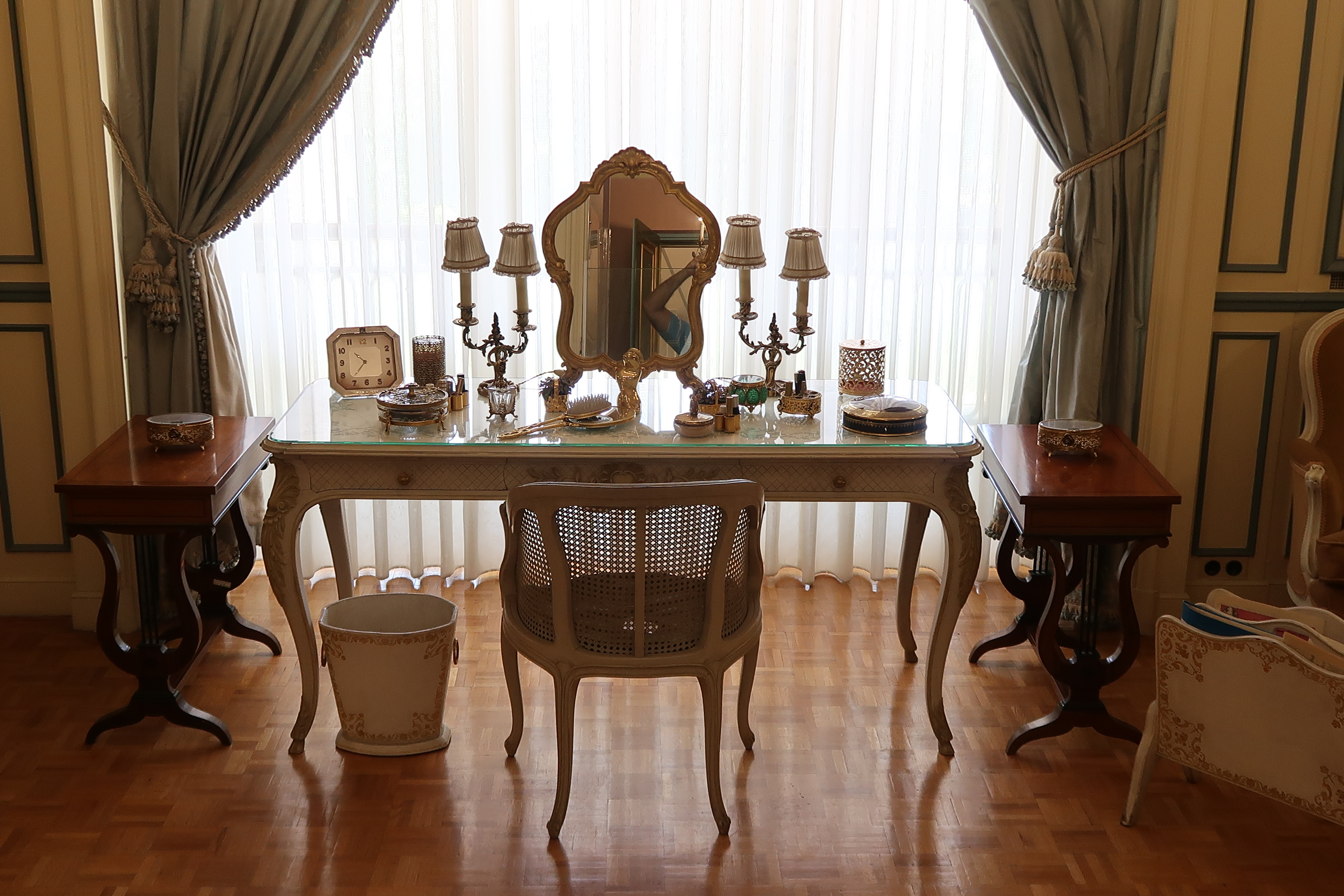
Farah Pahlavi's dressing table

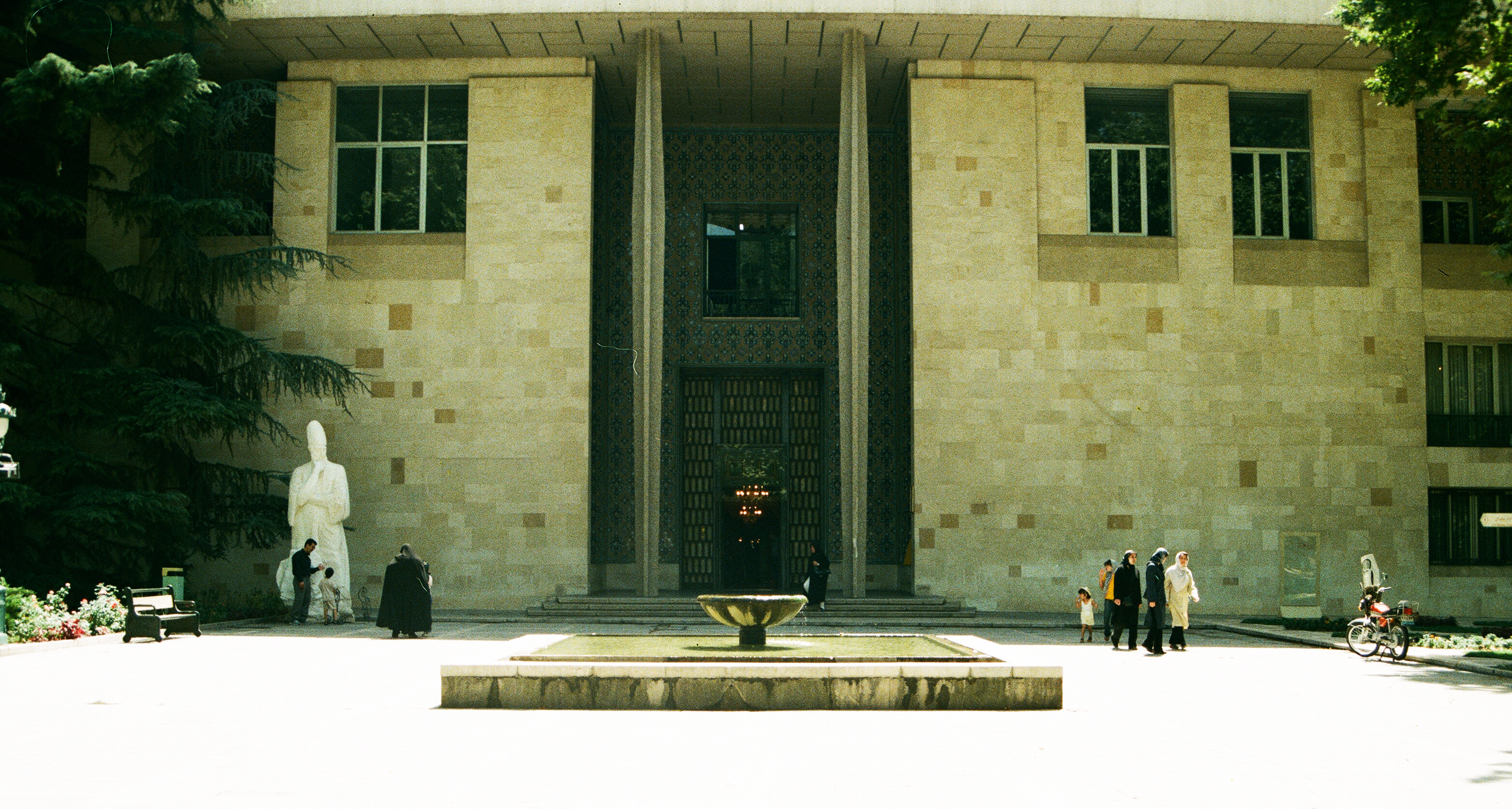
Facade of the palace

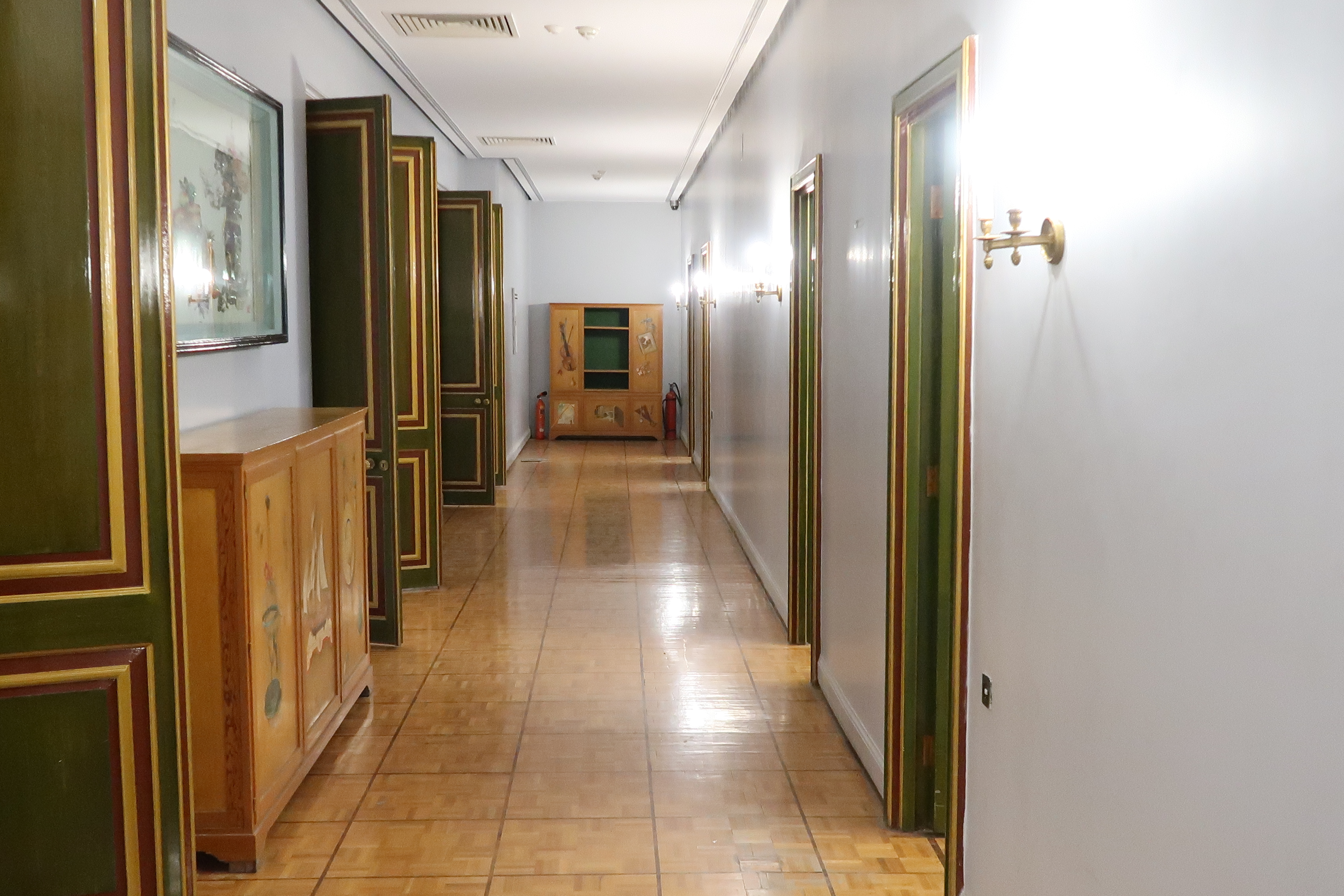
Corridor

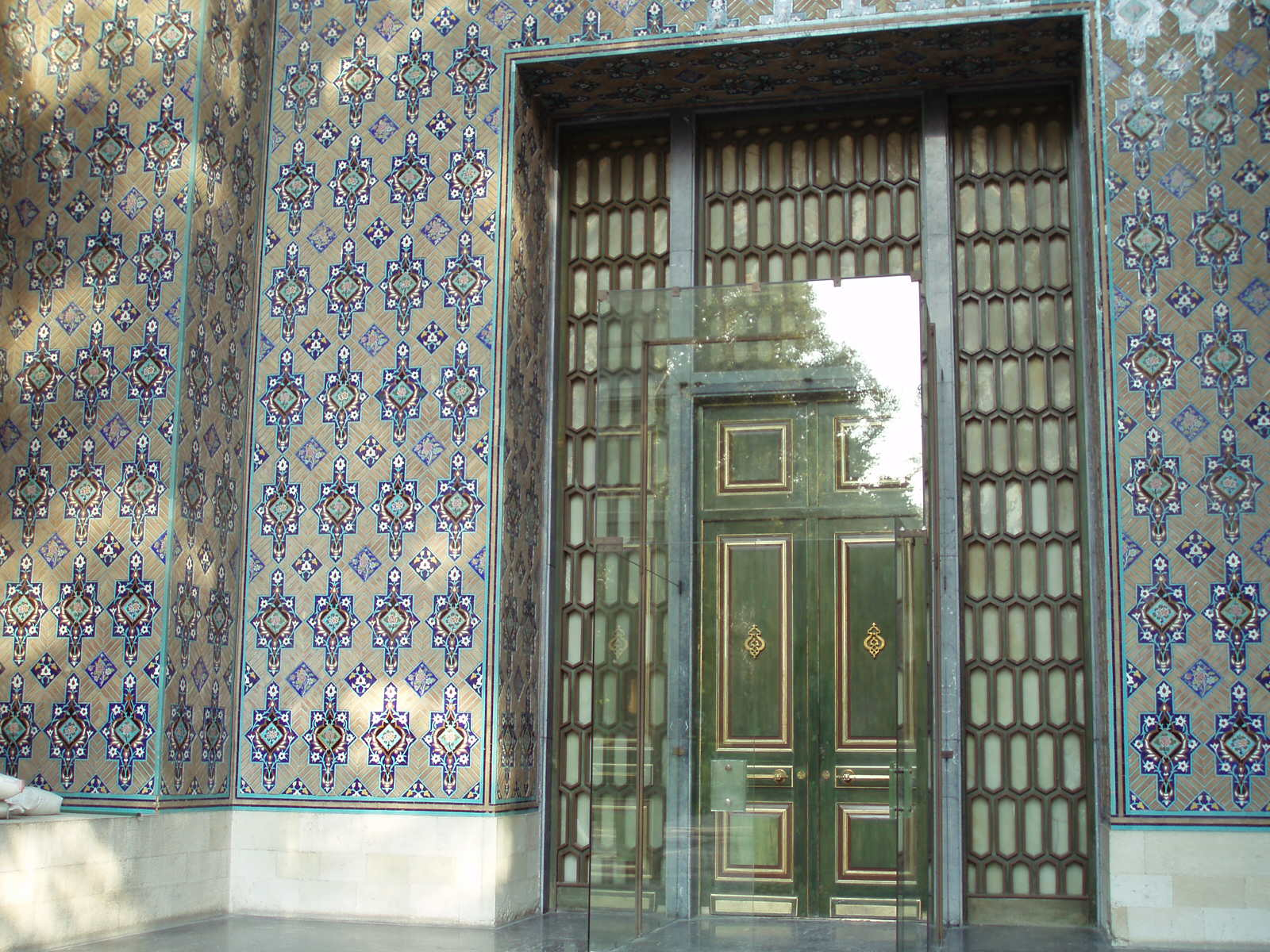
Front entrance

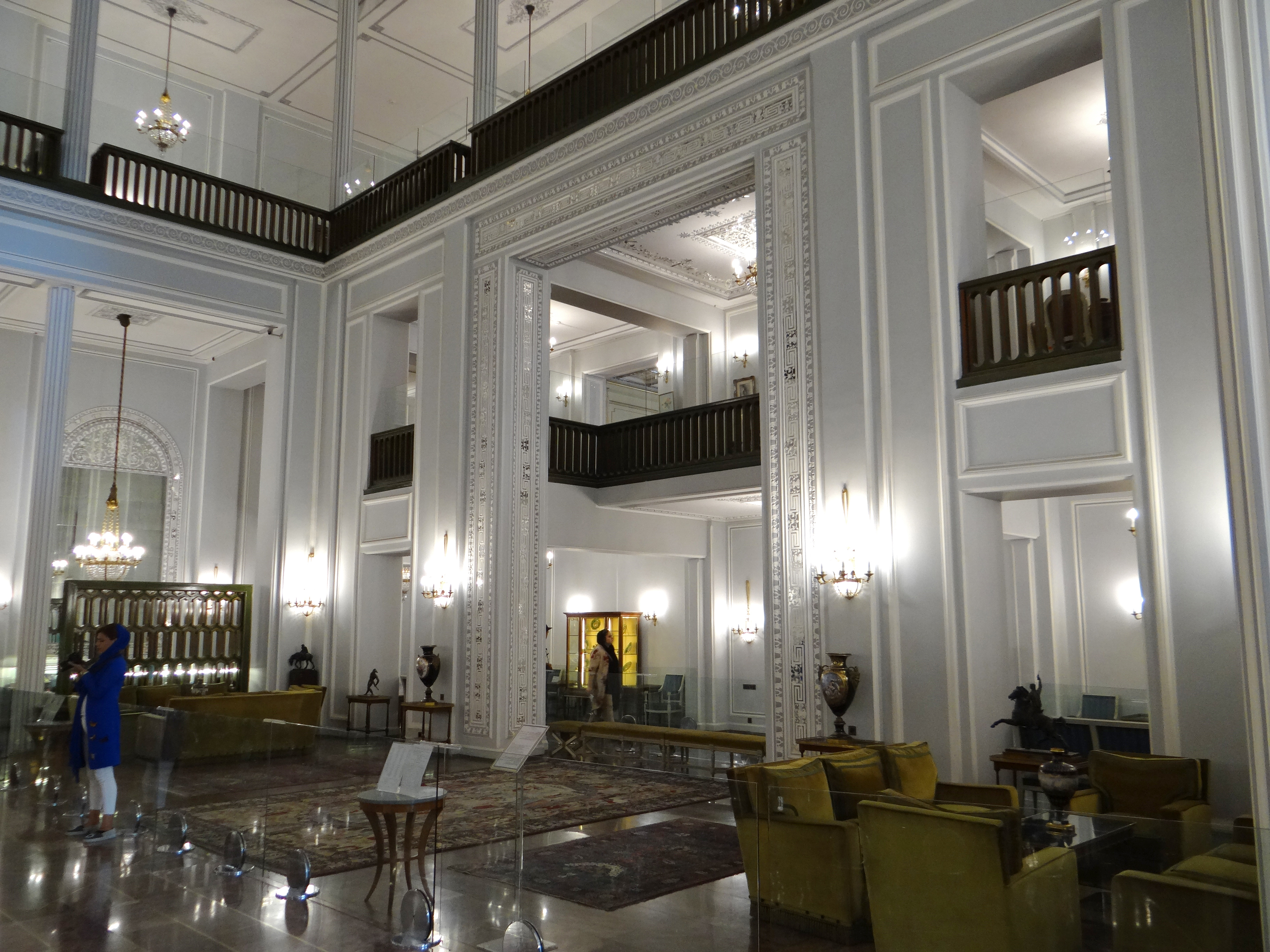
Living room

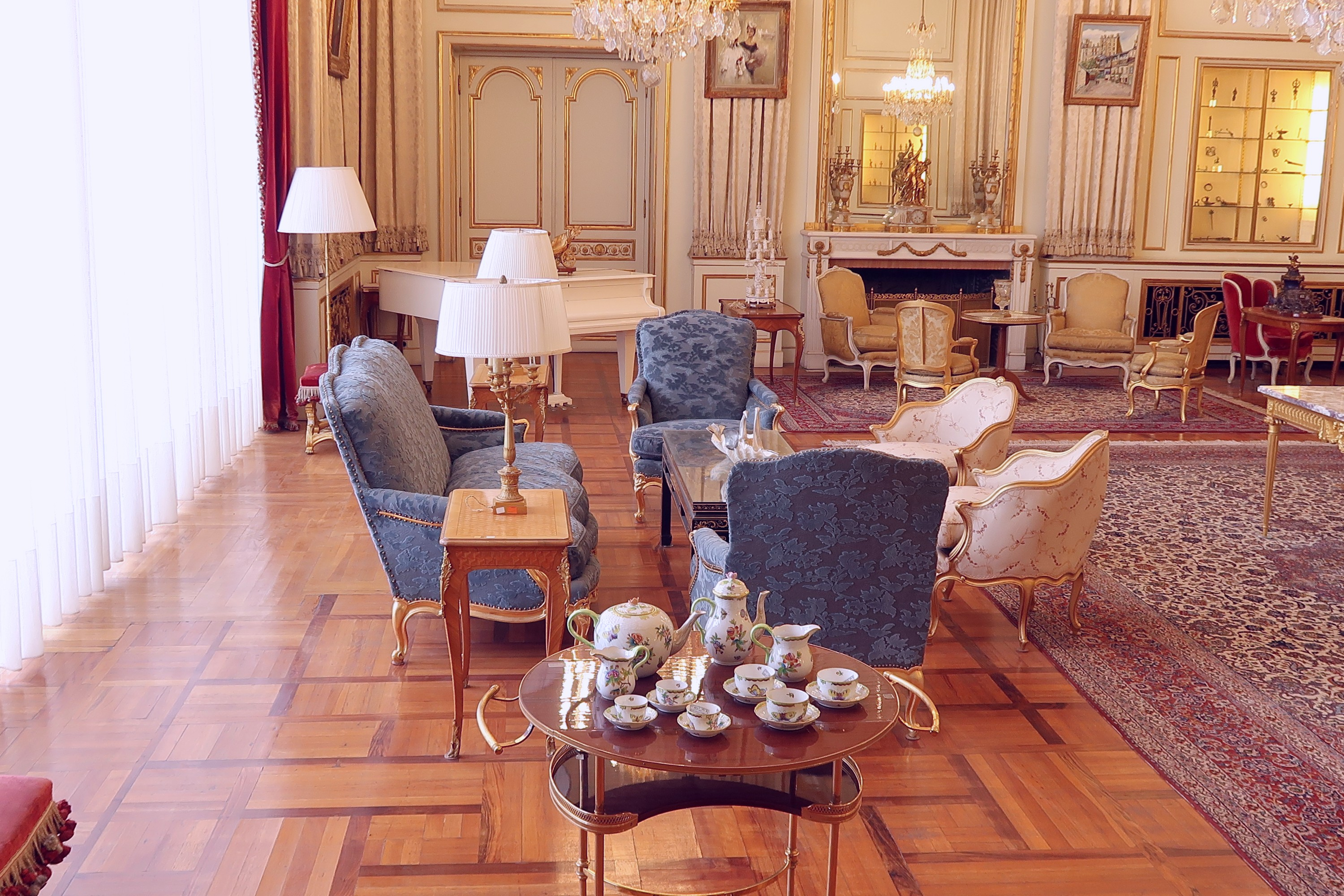
Meeting room

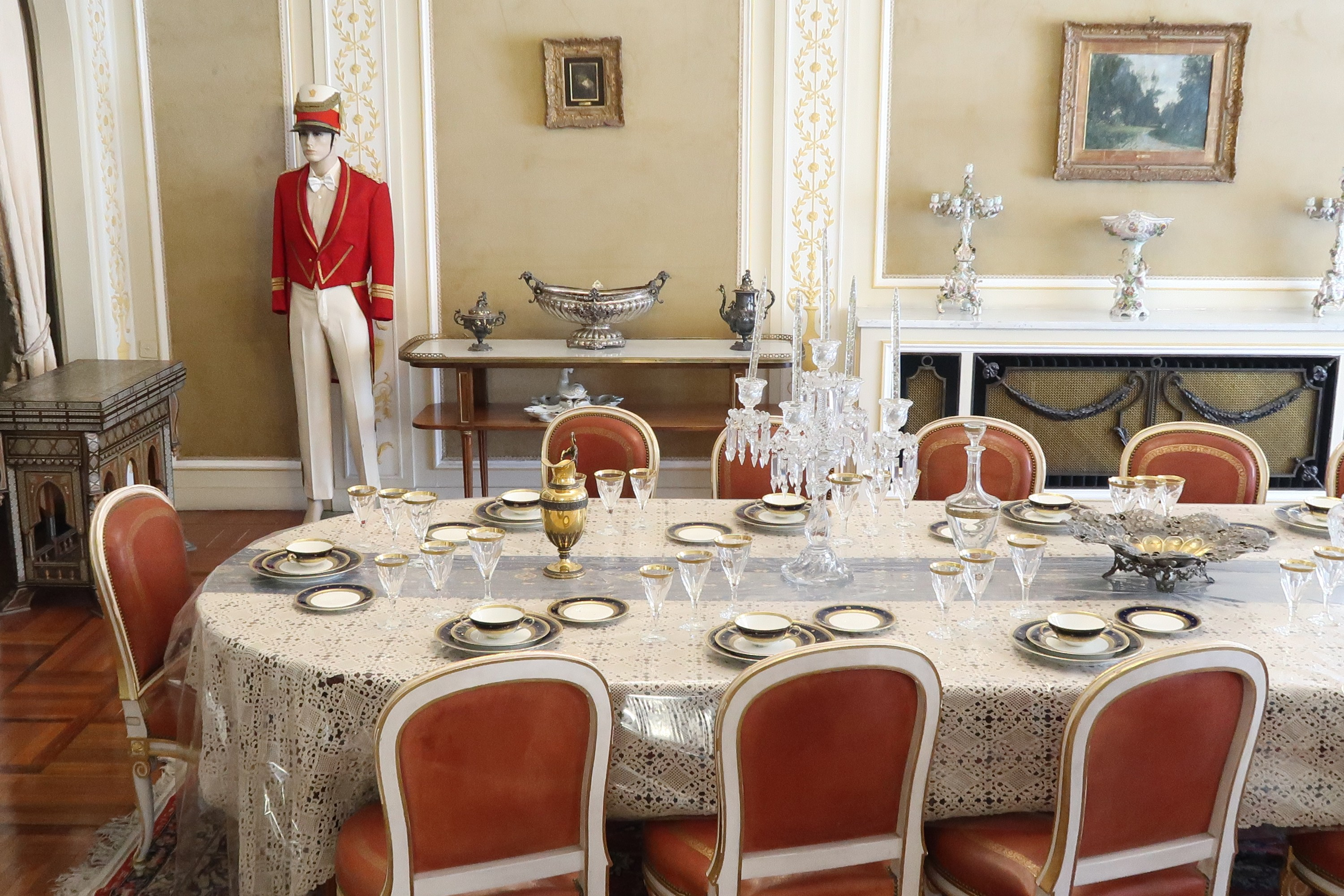
Dining room

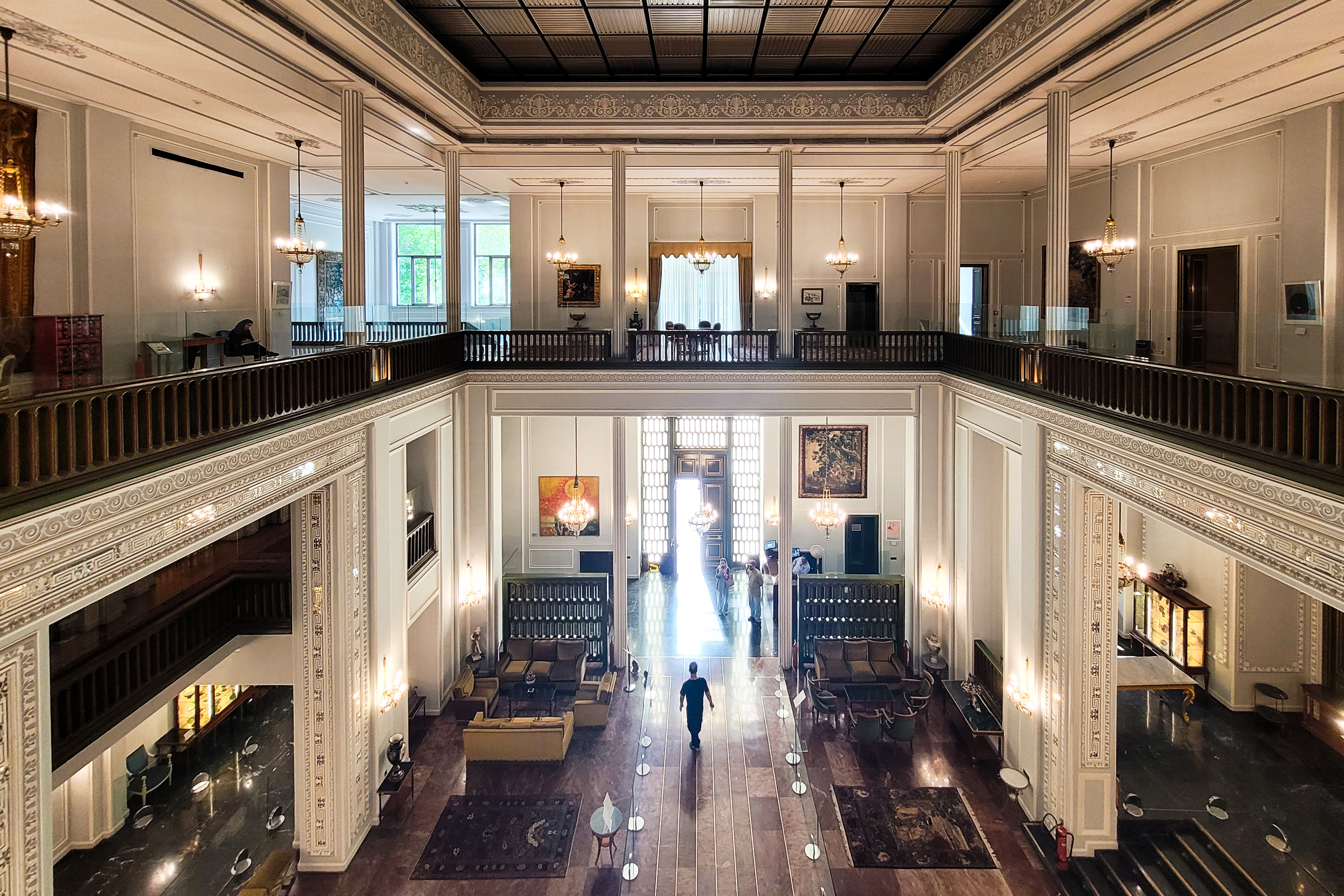
View from second floor

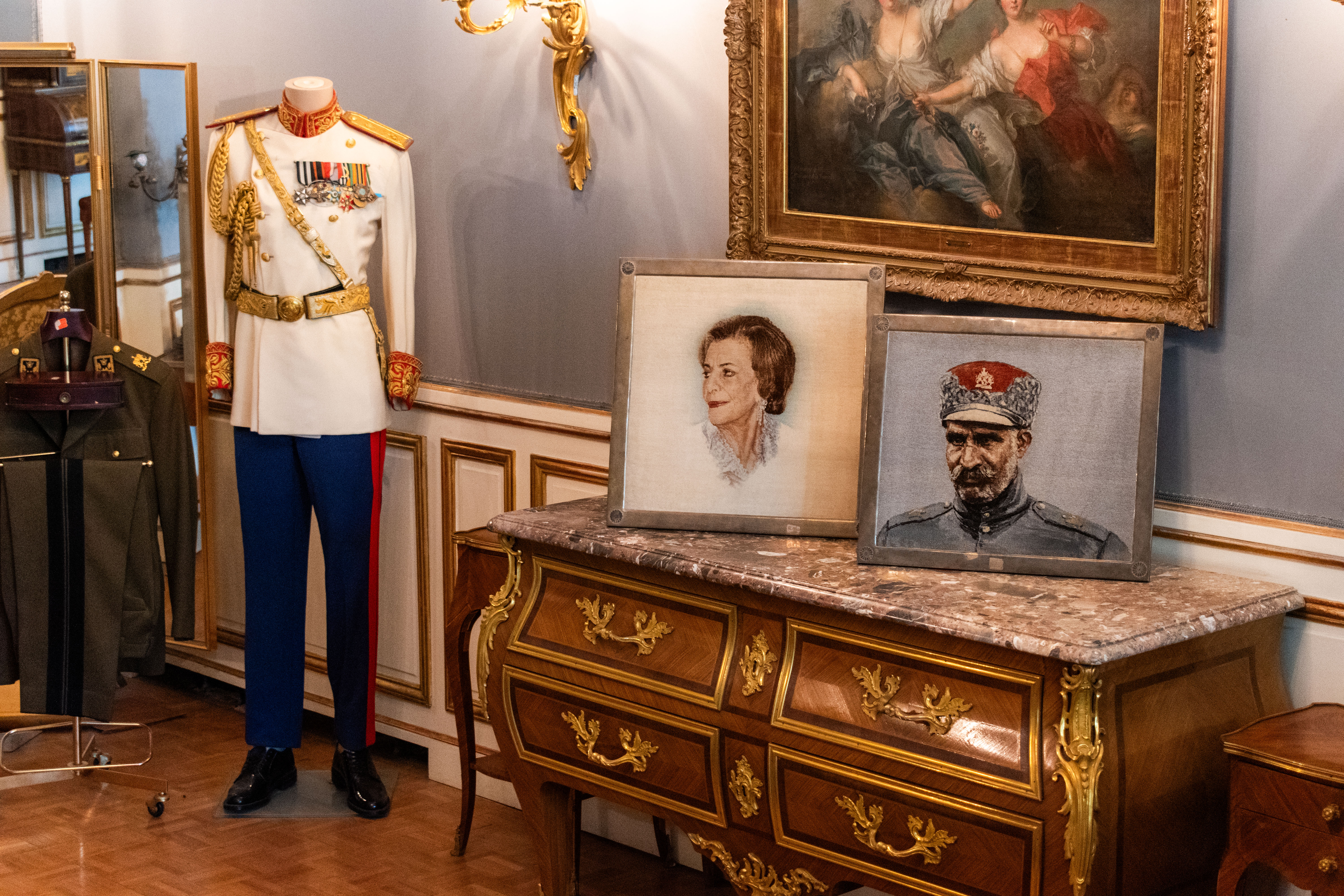
Mohammad Reza Pahlavi's royal uniform with portraits of his parents

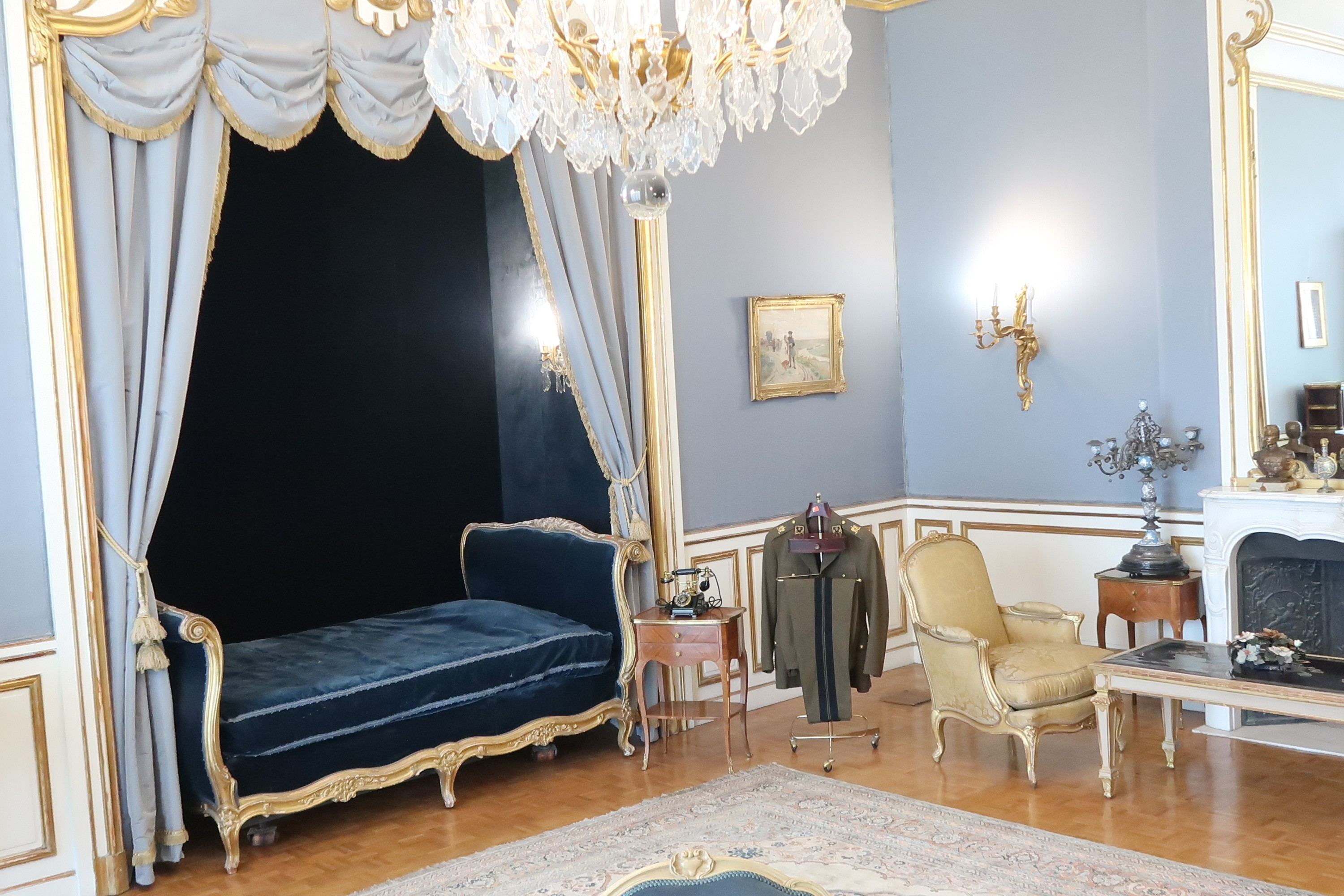
Resting room

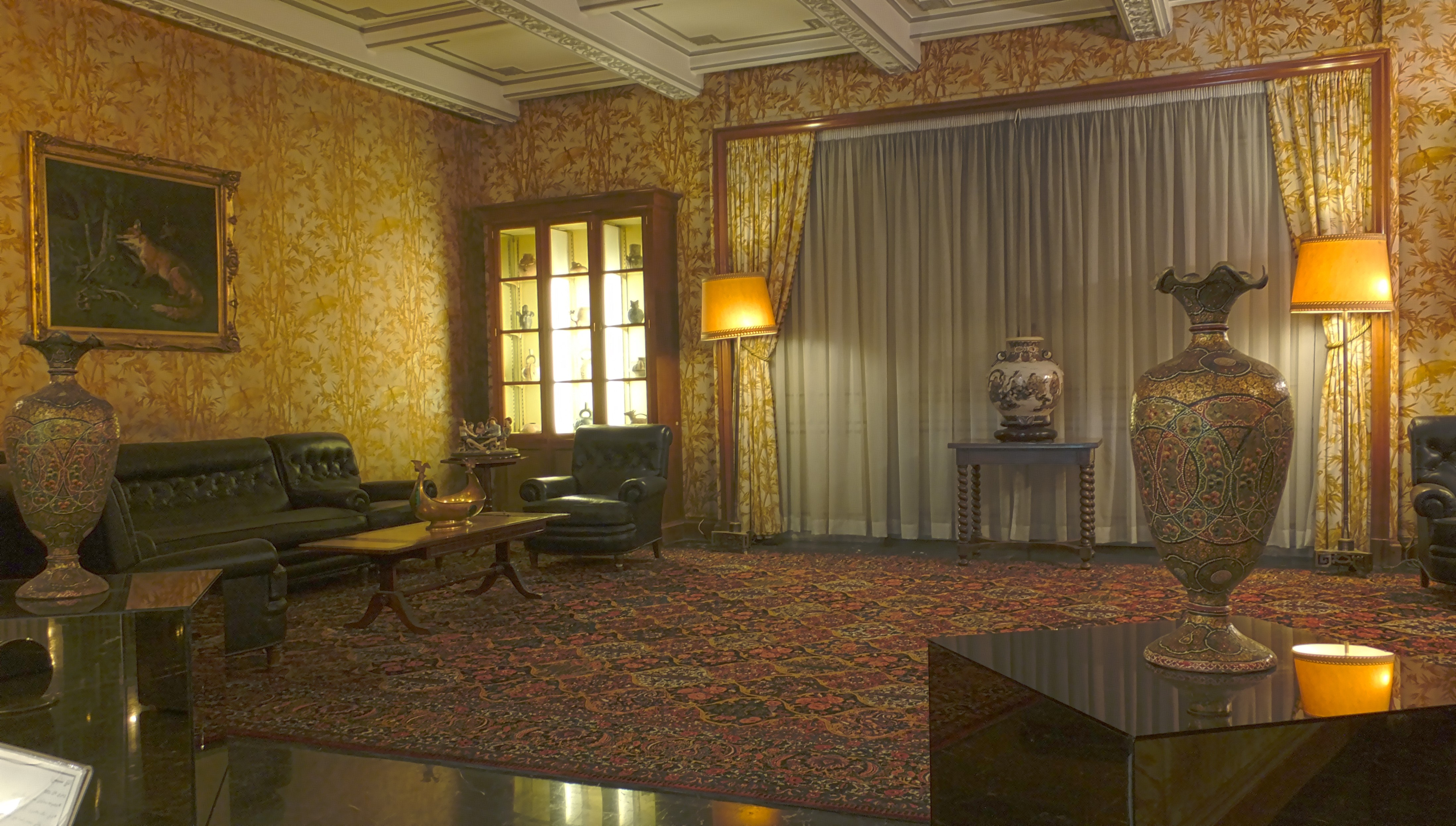
Ornate furniture

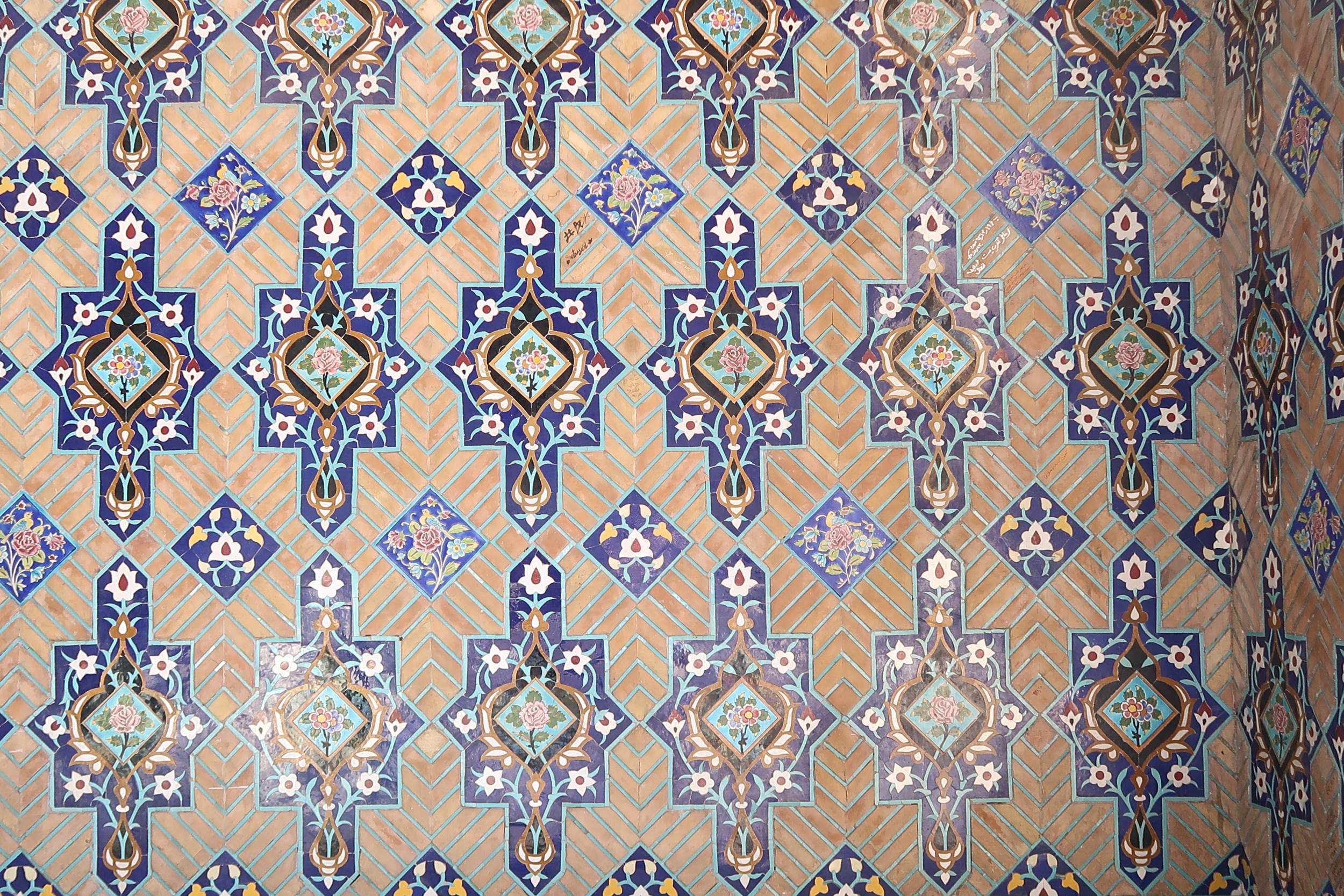
Facade tilework

== See also ==
- Sahebgharaniyeh Palace
- Ahmad Shahi Pavilion
- Niavaran Complex
- Niavaran Park
- Sa'dabad Complex
- List of royal palaces
- List of palaces in Iran
