= 50,000 rial note =

Iranian banknote

Fifty thousand rials
- Country: Iran
- Value: 50,000 rials
- Width: 166 mm
- Height: 79 mm
- Security features: Security fluorescent fibers and ink, watermark, embedded and window security thread, intaglio micro printing, raised printing, linear image, electrotype, see-through image
- Material used: 100% cotton
- Years of printing: Since 11 March 2007; 18 years ago

The fifty thousand rial or five thousand toman banknote is a denomination of Iranian currency that was issued in 2007, and was considered its largest denomination until 2010.

The banknote is printed on cotton-based paper and incorporates several security features. These include intaglio printing, a watermark with electrotype elements, a security thread, see-through register, and microprinting designed to make counterfeiting more difficult.

== Design ==
The 50,000 Iranian rial banknote has been issued in multiple designs that share a common layout but differ in reverse imagery and certain graphical details. The note follows the general stylistic conventions of other modern Iranian banknotes, with a portrait on the obverse and a culturally or politically significant scene on the reverse.

=== Observe ===
On the obverse, the central element is a portrait of Ayatollah Ruhollah Khomeini, rendered in intaglio and framed by arabesque and geometric ornamental patterns typical of Iranian banknote design. The denomination appears in both Eastern and Western Arabic numerals, and inscriptions identify the Central Bank of the Islamic Republic of Iran and specify the note’s legal-tender status.

=== Reverse ===
The reverse design has changed over time. Earlier issues display a map of Iran overlaid with a stylized atomic symbol and related decorative elements, an image that became associated with discussions of Iran’s nuclear and scientific activities. Later issues replace this composition with a depiction of Hafezieh, the tomb of the poet Hafez in Shiraz, accompanied by ornamental motifs and calligraphic text.

=== Coloring ===
Color schemes vary slightly between series but generally employ a combination of green, blue, and brown tones, with gradations and guilloché patterns integrated into both background and borders. The placement of numerals, signatures of central bank officials, and textual elements remains largely consistent, with adjustments mainly reflecting new signatures or updated design conventions.

=== Redenomination ===
In more recent printings, the graphic treatment of the denomination has been modified so that the four trailing zeroes in “50,000” are printed in a lighter shade than the leading “5.” This design choice visually anticipates a potential redenomination by aligning the note’s appearance with a prospective “5 toman” value, while preserving its current status as 50,000 rials.

Largest denomination of Iran
Preceded by 20,000 rials note	50,000 rials note 2007–2010	Succeeded by 100,000 rials note
