= Mohsen Foroughi =

Iranian politician and architect (1907–1983)

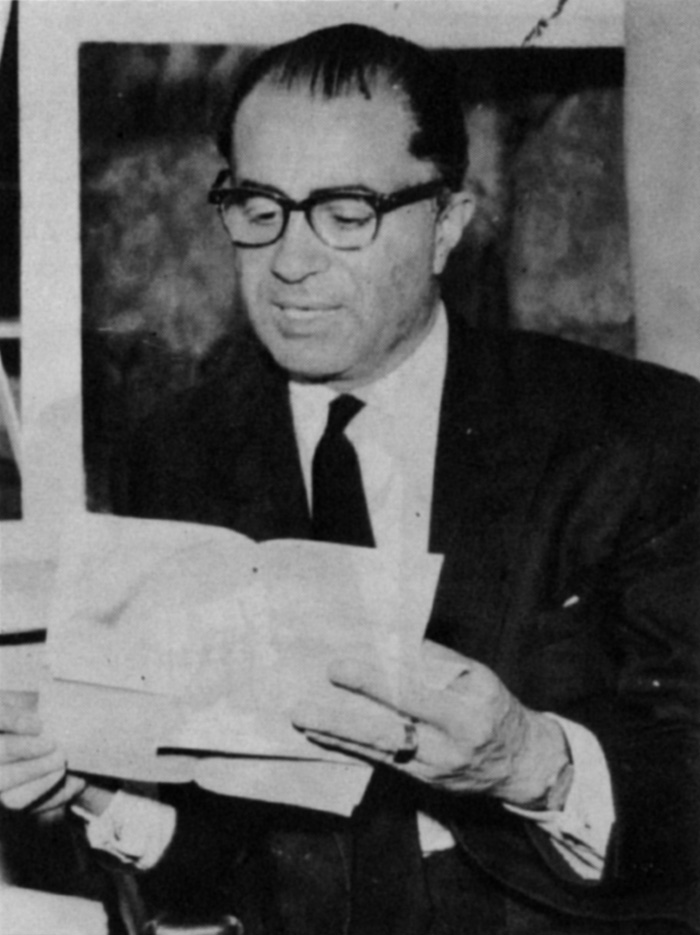
- Mohsen Foroughi in the 1950s
- Born: 14 May 1907; Tehran, Sublime State of Iran
- Died: 6 October 1983 (aged 76); Tehran, Iran
- Resting place: Ibn Babawayh Cemetery, Ray, Iran
- Known for: Niavaran Palace
- Father: Mohammad Ali Foroughi

Mohsen Foroughi (Persian: محسن فروغی; 14 May 1907 – 6 October 1983) was an Iranian architect, and one of the founders in 1945 of the influential Association of Iranian Architects. He is best known for designing Niavaran Palace in 1958. The palace served as the official residence of Shah Mohammad Reza Pahlavi from 1967 until the 1979 Iranian Revolution.

He designed the Faculty of Law and Political Science of Tehran University. After Andre Godard retired as the dean of the Faculty of Fine Arts at Tehran University, Mohsen Foroughi took on the position. This transition marked a significant change within the Faculty of Fine Arts. Notably, Persian was adopted as the language of instruction, aligning with the language policies of the university's other faculties.

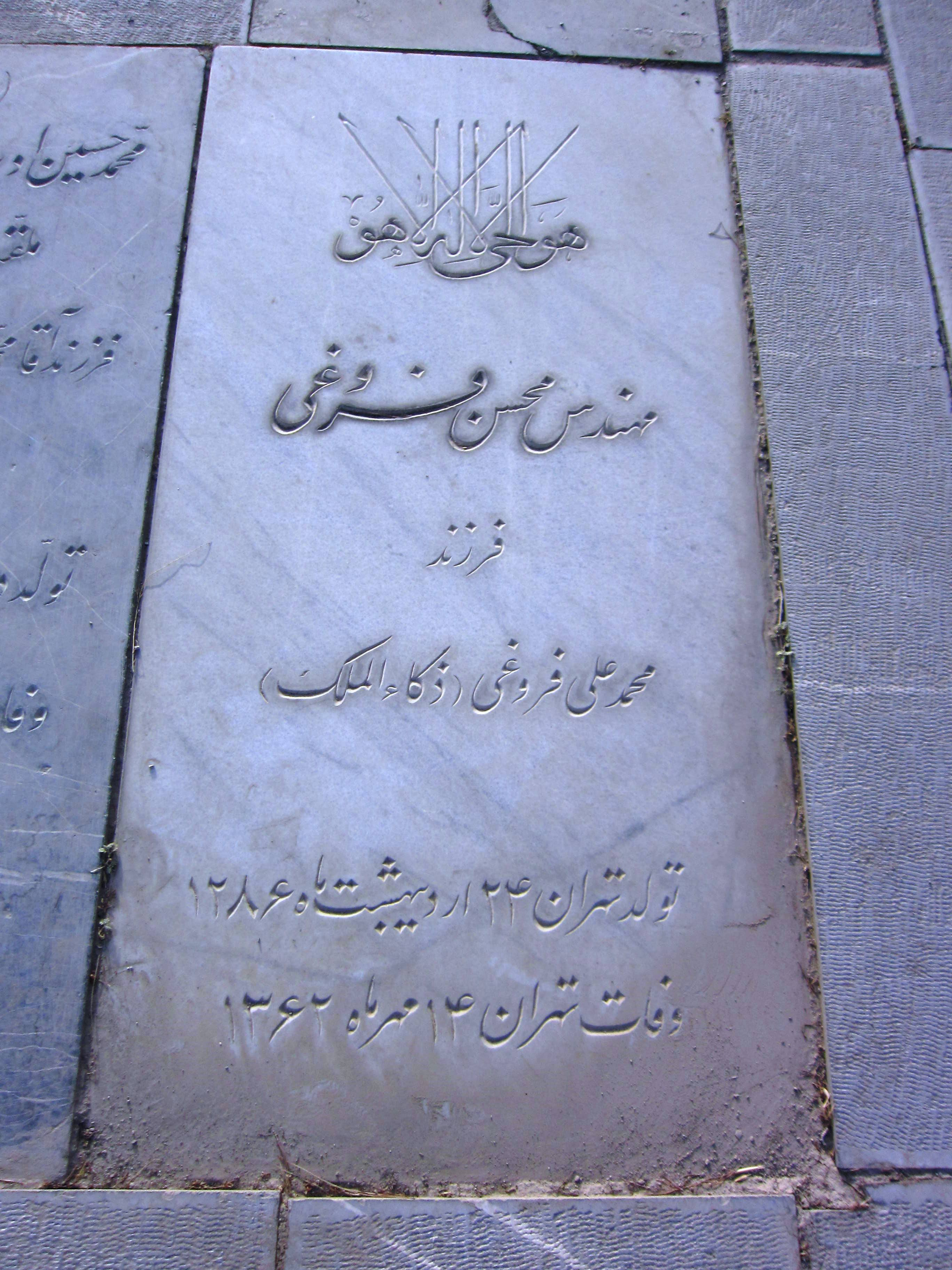
Grave of Mohsen Foroughi, Ibn Babawayh Cemetery in Rey

== Education and career ==
Foroughi studied architecture at the École des Beaux-Arts in Paris and graduated in 1937, receiving the school's prize for the best diploma. He returned to Iran that year and began teaching at the University of Tehran. In 1940, he worked with André Godard, Maxime Siroux and Roland Dubrulle in establishing the university's Faculty of Fine Arts, where he was one of the first professors and later succeeded Godard as dean. Architectural historians Peyman Akhgar and Antony Moulis identify him as the first Iranian graduate of the École des Beaux-Arts and describe his teaching and professional activity as important to the development of architecture as a modern profession in Iran.

While working with the technical office of Bank Melli Iran and with government ministries, Foroughi designed the Ministry of Finance and several bank buildings, including branches in Shiraz, Isfahan and Tabriz and an office in Tehran's bazaar. He also undertook projects for the National Monuments Council, among them the Tomb of Saadi in Shiraz and the mausoleum of Baba Tahir in Hamadan. With Godard, Siroux and Dubrulle, he contributed to the master plan of the University of Tehran and buildings including its Faculty of Law and Political Science. His Bank Melli building in the Tehran bazaar combined a modern reinforced-concrete structure and functional plan with decorative tile panels that referred to established Iranian architectural practice.
