= Emam Abdollah =

Emam Abdollah امام عبداله
- Village
- Location within Iran
- Coordinates: 37°05′26″N 55°23′30″E
- Country: Iran
- Province: Golestan
- County: Minudasht
- Bakhsh: Central
- Rural District: Chehel Chay

Population (2016)
  - Total: 285
- Time zone: UTC+3:30 (IRST)

Emam Abdollah (Persian: امام عبداله, also Romanized as Emām ‘Abdollāh; also known as Emāmzādeh ‘Abdollāh) is a village in Chehel Chay Rural District, in the Central District of Minudasht County, Golestan Province, Iran.

At the time of the 2006 National Census, the village's population was 241 in 81 households. The following census in 2011 counted 200 people in 75 households. The 2016 census measured the population of the village as 285 people in 108 households.
