= Emamzadeh Abdollah, Markazi =

Emamzadeh Abdollah امامزاده عبدالله
- Village
- Location within Iran
- Coordinates: 33°38′24″N 49°43′18″E
- Country: Iran
- Province: Markazi
- County: Khomeyn
- Bakhsh: Kamareh
- Rural District: Chahar Cheshmeh

Population (2006)
  - Total: 12
- Time zone: UTC+3:30 (IRST)
  - Summer (DST): UTC+4:30 (IRDT)

Emamzadeh Abdollah (Persian: امامزاده عبدالله, also Romanized as Emāmzādeh ‘Abdollāh; also known as Emāmzādeh Shāhzādeh ‘Abdollāh) is a village in Chahar Cheshmeh Rural District, Kamareh District, Khomeyn County, Markazi Province, Iran. At the 2006 census, its population was 12, in 4 families.
