= Goldis Tower =

Commercial center in Tehran, Iran

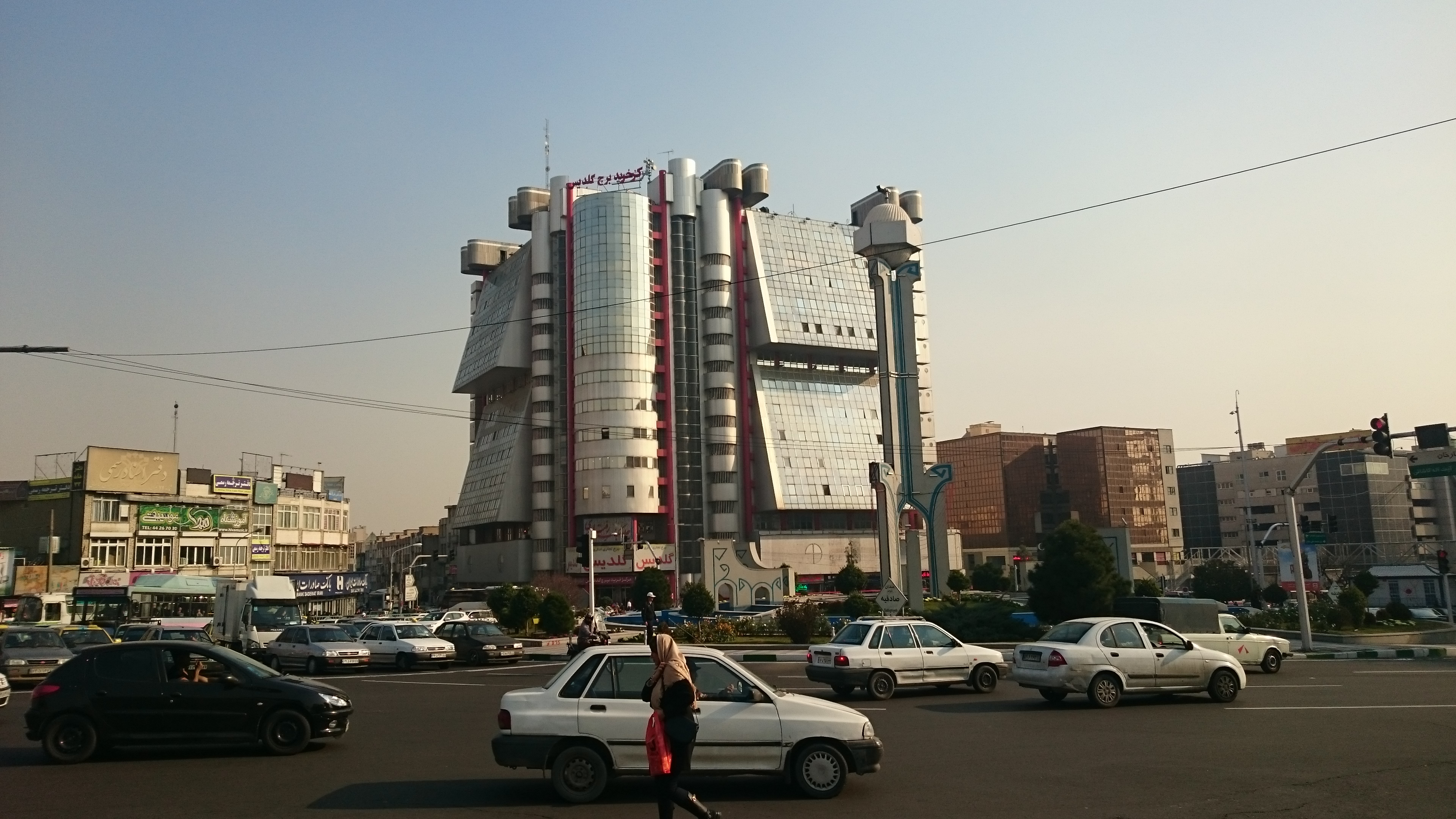

- Location in Tehran Location in Iran

General information
- Status: Completed
- Type: Commercial Center
- Location: Tehran, Iran
- Coordinates: 35.7217°N 51.3361°E

Website
- http://www.goldispassage.ir/

Goldis Tower (aka Borj-e Goldis ) (Persian: برج گلدیس) is a shopping center located in the commercial district of Sadeghiyeh (Aryashahr) in west of Tehran, Iran. It is a 13-floors building among which 3 first floors are commercial and the upper 10 floors serve as office use.
