= Emamzadeh Abdollah, Ardabil =

Emamzadeh Abdollah
- Location in Iran
- Coordinates: 37°23′03″N 48°42′38″E
- Country: Iran
- Province: Ardabil Province
- Time zone: UTC+3:30 (IRST)
  - Summer (DST): UTC+4:30 (IRDT)

Emamzadeh Abdollah is a village in the Ardabil Province of Iran.
