= Emamzadeh Shahzadeh Abdollah =

Emamzadeh Shahzadeh Abdollah امامزاده شاهزاده عبداله
- Village
- Location within Iran
- Coordinates: 32°25′48″N 49°29′45″E
- Country: Iran
- Province: Khuzestan
- County: Andika
- Bakhsh: Central
- Rural District: Shalal and Dasht-e Gol

Population (2006)
  - Total: 203
- Time zone: UTC+3:30 (IRST)
  - Summer (DST): UTC+4:30 (IRDT)

Emamzadeh Shahzadeh Abdollah (Persian: امامزاده شاهزاده عبداله, also Romanized as Emāmzādeh Shāhzādeh ‘Abdollāh; also known as Emāmzādeh ‘Abdollāh) is a village in Shalal and Dasht-e Gol Rural District, in the Central District of Andika County, Khuzestan Province, Iran. At the 2006 census, its population was 203, in 33 families.
