= Tomb of Saadi =

Islamic tomb and monument in Shiraz, Iran

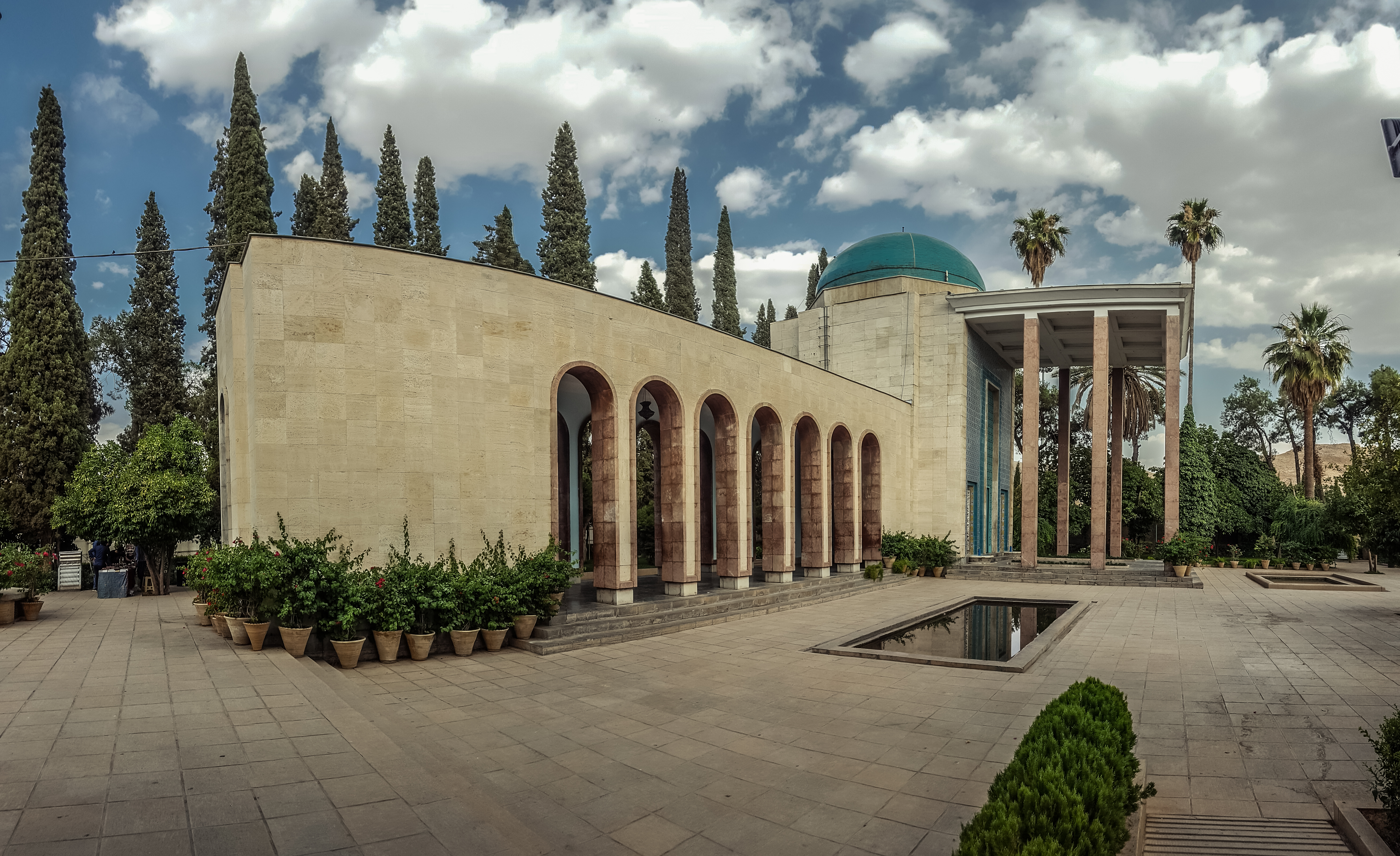
- The tomb in 2016

- Location of the complex in Iran

Religion
- Affiliation: Sunni Islam
- Ecclesiastical or organizational status: Mausoleum
- Status: Active
- Dedicated to: Saadi

Location
- Location: Shiraz, Fars province
- Country: Iran
- Interactive map of Tomb of Saadi
- Coordinates: 29°37′21″N 52°34′59″E

Architecture
- Architect: Mohsen Foroughi (1952)
- Type: Islamic architecture
- Completed: 13th century CE; 1187 AH (1773/1774 CE); 1952 CE
- Destroyed: 17th century (rebuilt)

Specifications
- Dome: One
- Site area: 10,000 m^{2} (110,000 sq ft)
- Materials: Granite; stone; marble

Iran National Heritage List
- Official name: Saadi Mausoleum
- Type: Built
- Designated: 9 December 1975
- Reference no.: 1110
- Conservation organization: Cultural Heritage, Handicrafts and Tourism Organization of Iran

The Tomb of Saadi (Persian: آرامگاه سعدی شیرازی) (Note: Other variants include the Sadi Tomb, the Tomb of Sa'di-e-Shirazi, and the Mausoleum of Sa'di.) is a tomb and mausoleum complex dedicated to the Persian poet Saadi, commonly known as Saadieh (Persian: سعدیه). The complex is located in the city of Shiraz, in the province of Fars, Iran.

The complex was added to the Iran National Heritage List on 9 December 1975, administered by the Cultural Heritage, Handicrafts and Tourism Organization of Iran.

== History ==
Saadi was buried at the end of his life at a khanqah at the current location. In the 13th century, a tomb was built for Saadi by Shams al-Din Juvayni, the vizir of Abaqa Khan. In the 17th century, this tomb was destroyed. During the reign of Karim Khan Zand, a mausoleum of two floors of brick and plaster, flanked by two rooms, was built. The current building was constructed between 1950 and 1952 to a design by the architect Mohsen Foroughi and was inspired by the Chehel Sotoun with a fusion of old and new architectural elements. Around the tomb on the walls are seven verses of Saadi's poems.

== The new building ==
The new building was constructed in Persian style. It includes eight brown stone pillars at the front of the tomb. The main structure is made of white stones and tiles. The building of the tomb of Saadi Shirazi has a cubic shape from the outside, and from the inside, it is in the form of an octagon with walls of marble and an azure arch. The tomb of Saadi Shirazi has an area of approximately 257 square metres (2,770 sq ft). The main building of the tomb includes two terraces that are perpendicular to each other. The tomb of Saadi is located at the angle of these terraces, inside an octagonal building on top of which stands an amazing azure blue dome.

Over the tomb, there is an arch made of turquoise tiles. The stones of the bases of the structure are black, and the pillars and the front part of the terrace are made of red granite stone. The facade of the tomb is made of travertine stone, and the interior is made of marble.

=== Water features ===
A fish pond lies on the left side of the tomb of Saadi Shirazi. It has an octagonal shape and an area of approximately 30.25 square metres (325.6 sq ft). At the front of the terrace, there is a pond where visitors often throw coins. Approxmiately 10 metres (33 ft) below the tomb of Saadi Shirazi, there is an aqueduct whose water contains sulphurous material and also quicksilver.

== Gallery ==
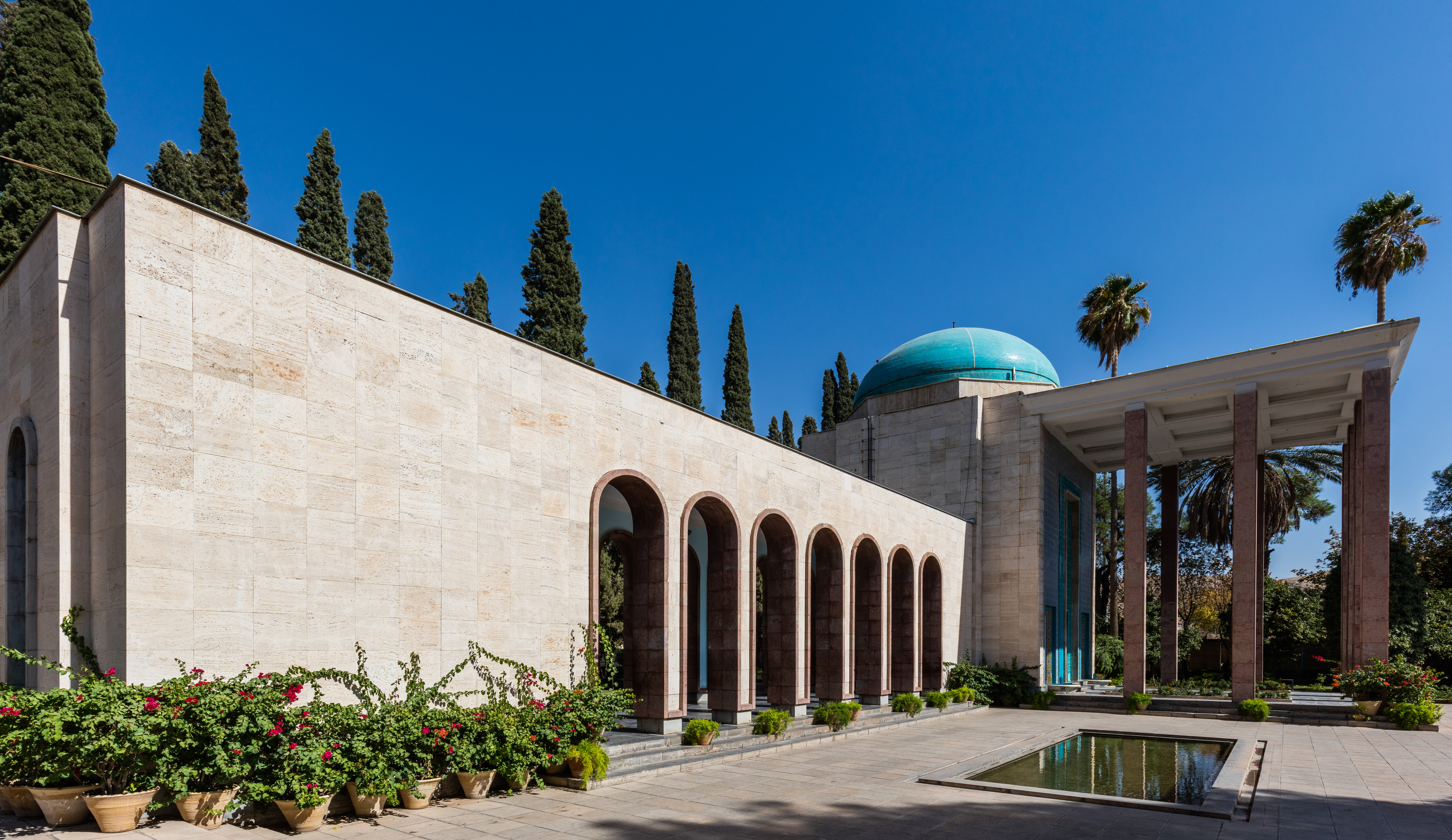
Exterior in 2016

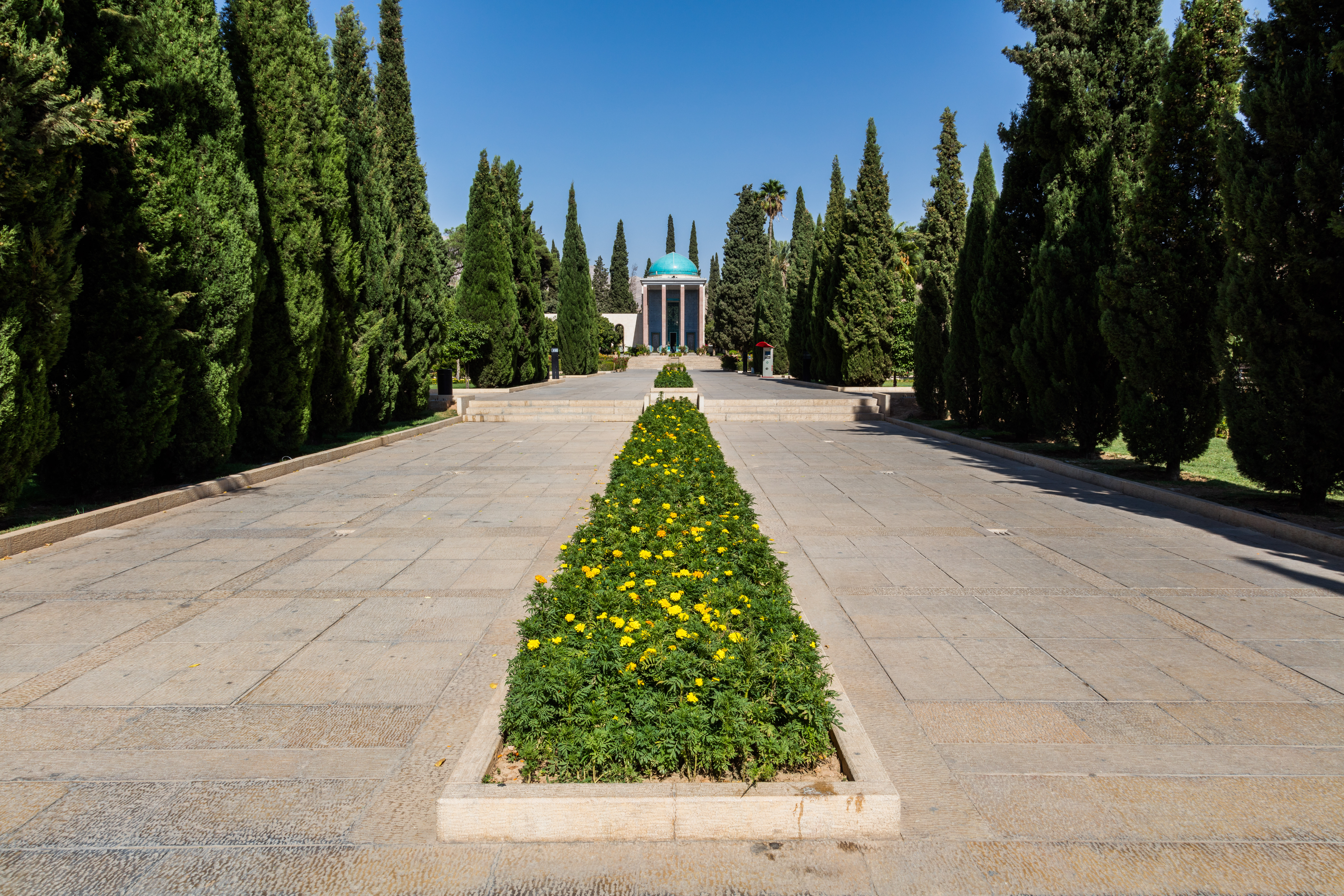
Terraces in 2016

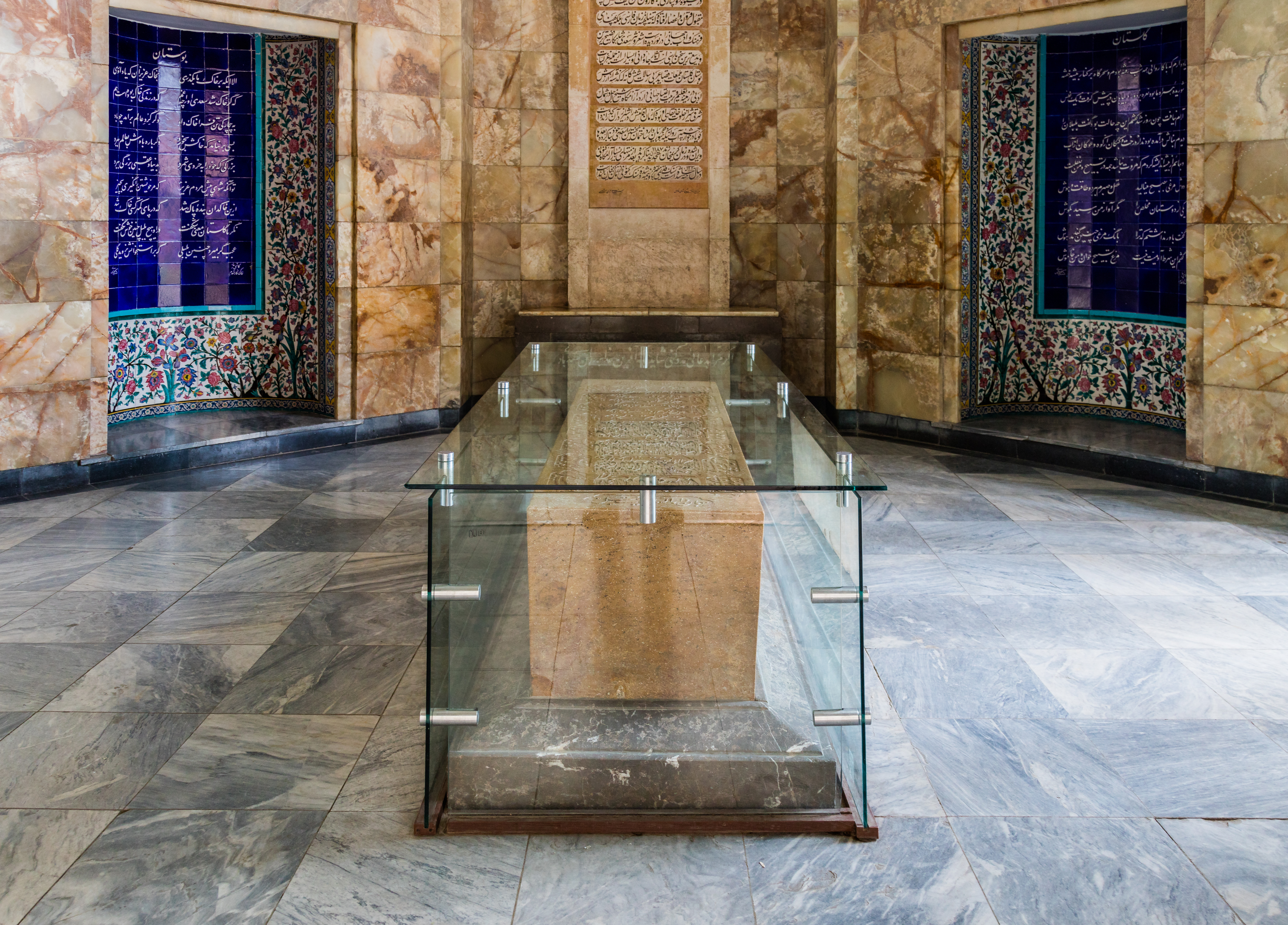
Tomb in 2016

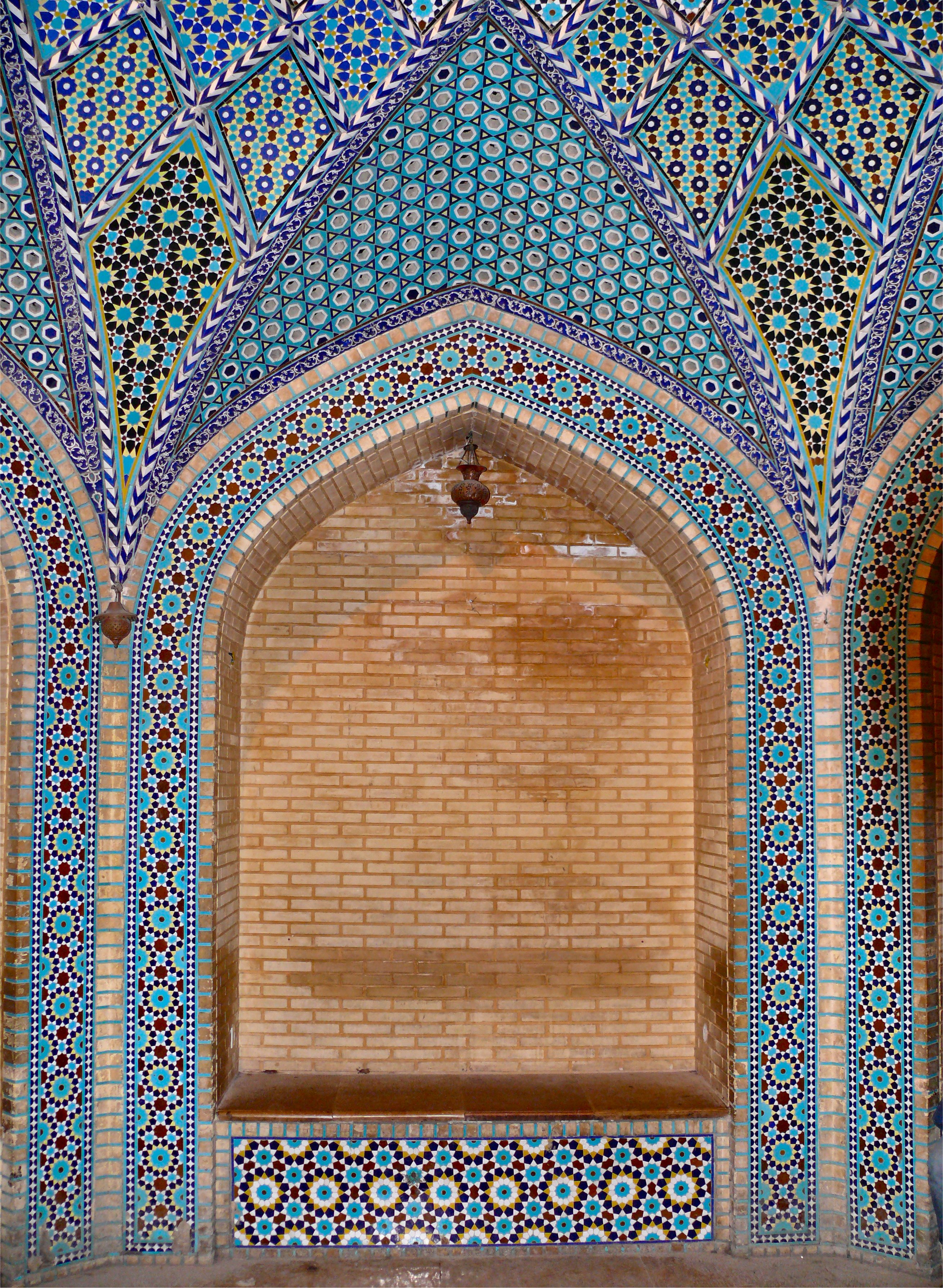
Alcove in 2008

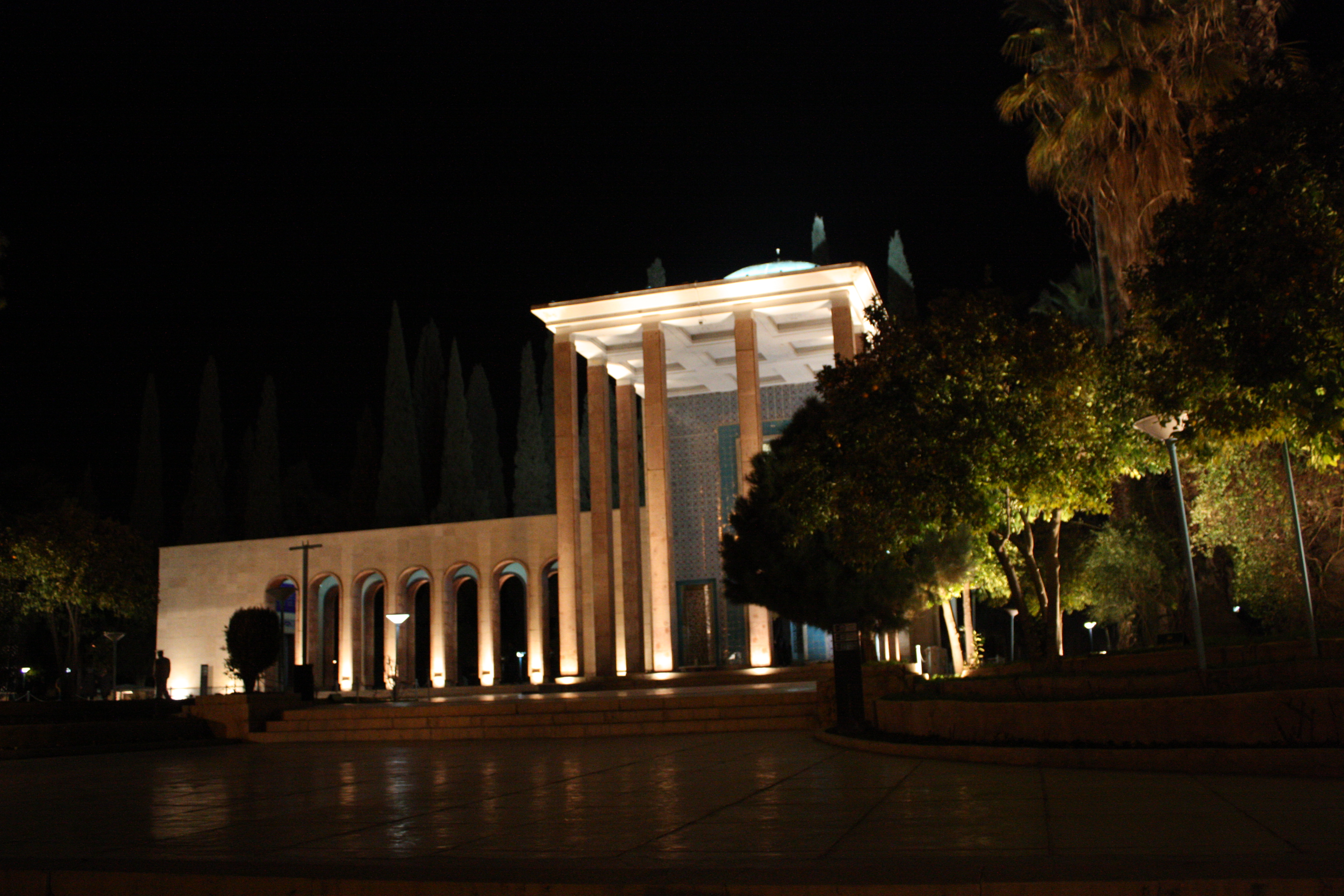
Exterior at night

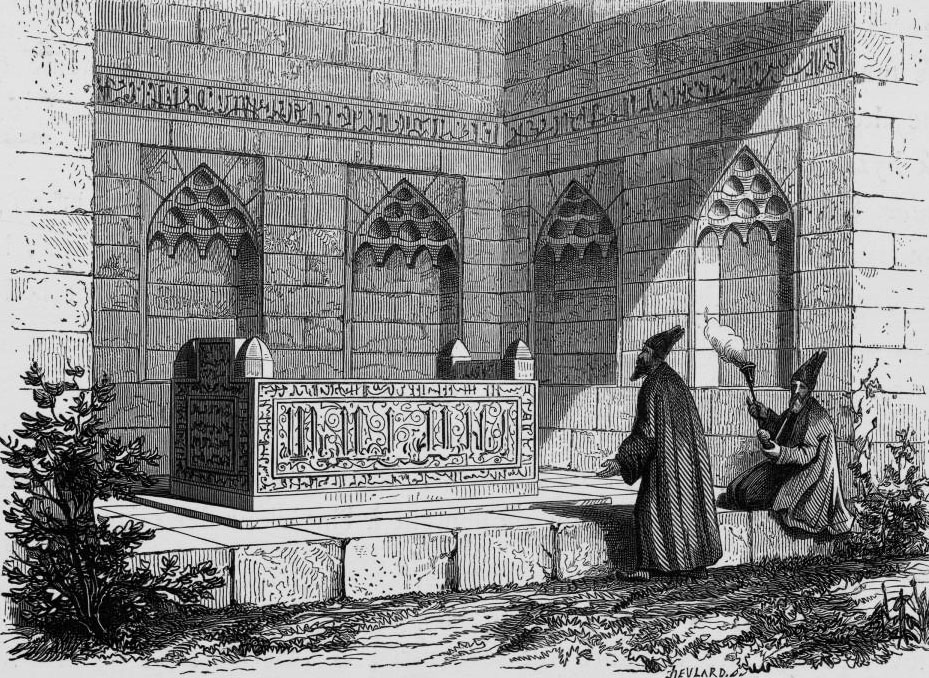
c. 1840

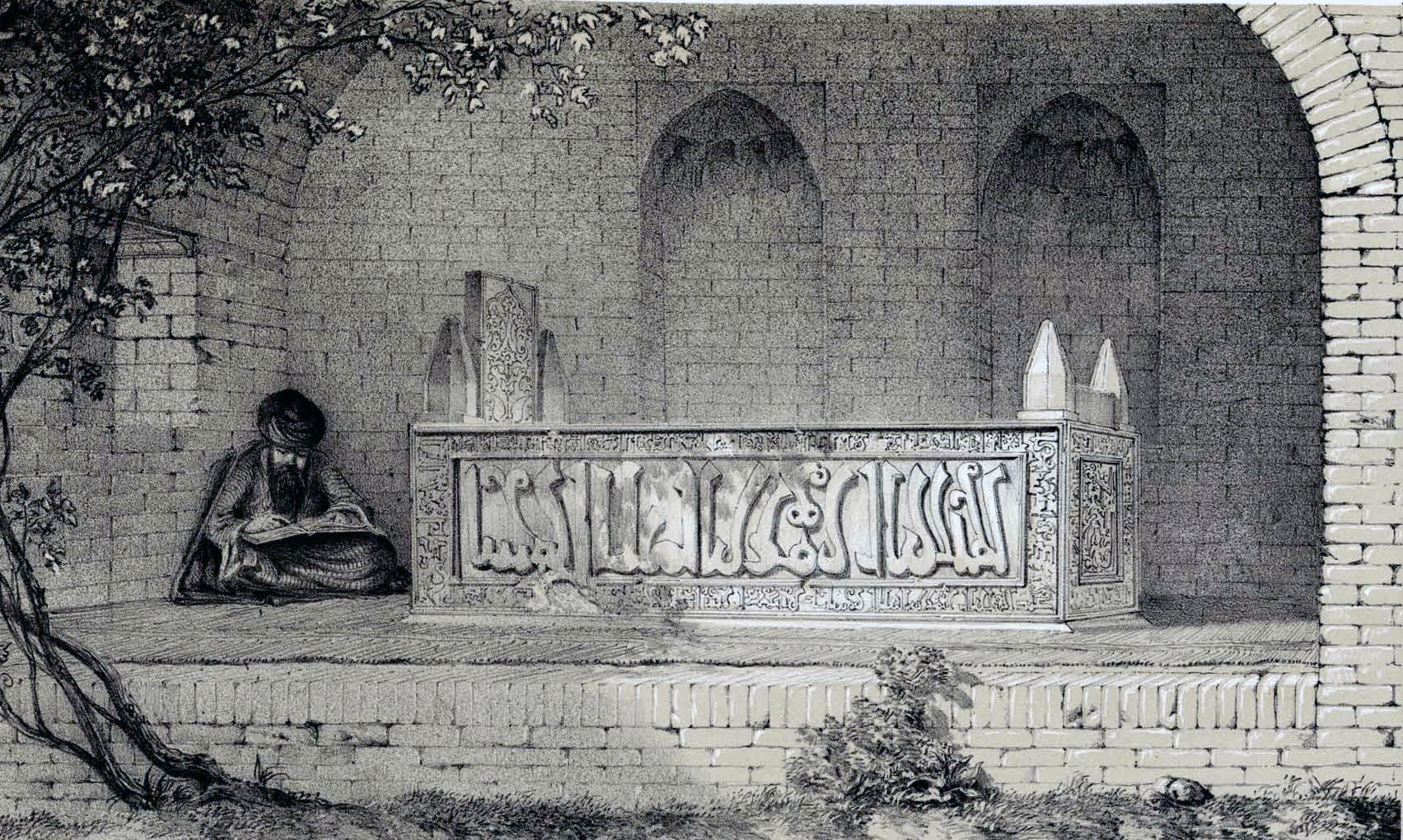
c. 1840, by Eugène Flandin

== See also ==
- Persian domes
- List of mausoleums in Iran
