= 10,000 rial note =

Ten thousand rials
- Country: Iran
- Value: 10,000 Iranian rial
- Width: 142 mm
- Height: 71 mm
- Security features: Security fluorescent fibers, watermark, security thread, intaglio micro printing, latent image, see-through image
- Material used: 100% cotton
- Years of printing: Since 1890; 135 years ago

Obverse
- Design date: 12 June 2017

Reverse
- Design date: 12 June 2017

The ten thousand rial banknote was the largest denomination of Iranian currency for decades. The banknote has had many different versions, featuring portraits of three Iranian rulers. A new version was introduced in 2017.

It was first printed by Imperial Bank of Persia by Bradbury Wilkinson and Company in Britain. As of 2025 the banknote is printed in green, blue, and olive and, like other common banknotes, the front side bears an image of Ayatollah Khomeini, with an image of Mount Damavand on the reverse.

== History ==
From the establishment of the Imperial Bank of Iran (during the era of Naser al-Din Shah Qajar), the first series of Iranian banknotes commissioned by the bank in 1269 in England and by the printing house Bradbury Wilkinson and Company in numbers 1, 2, 3, 5, 10, 20, 25, 50, 100, 500 and 1000 Tomans. All the bills, except for the thousand toman bill, which was kept as a backup in the bank's treasury, were included in the trading cycle.

== Specifications ==
=== Paper features ===
Khomeini's portrait is on the right and in paper pulp, which can be seen against light from both sides. A metalized 2.1 mm wide security thread is in the form of a window on which the word 10,000 Rials is visible in Persian and Latin. The paper pulp has invisible fluorescent green, blue, yellow and red fibers on the front and back of the banknote, which can be seen under ultraviolet radiation.

=== Print features ===
The type of printing is dry offset, and the serial number is printed in fluorescent red ink, which shows in gold color under ultraviolet radiation. The words "Central Bank of the Islamic Republic of Iran" are written in small print in the middle of the banknote above the words ten thousand rials and on the back of the banknote under Mount Damavand in Latin script, which can be seen with a magnifying glass. The bottom of the right corner of the banknote is in the form of a diagonal flower, which can be seen against the light with its complementary print on the back of the banknote. Some parts of this banknote have raised printing which can be felt by touch, and on the upper left side of the serial number two parallel lines are highlighted for easy identification of this banknote by blind people. The design of the logo of the Central Bank of the Islamic Republic of Iran is hidden on the left side of the word ten thousand rials on an olive-colored inscription, which will be highlighted by tilting the design and shining light on the lines.

== New banknote ==
In order to move toward harmonizing the banknote and Irancheck and reducing production costs, the central bank started distributing a new, smaller, all-green ten thousand rial banknote in mid-June 2016.

=== Intergenerational banknote with pale zero ===
The 2016 ten thousand rial note is designed in such a way that only ten thousand rials are written in the upper right corner with the faintest zero, and only the number one is printed in the two lower corners of the banknote. On the banknote, Ayatollah Khomeini's photo is placed on the left side of the banknote, and the back of the banknote is also engraved with Ibn Sina's tomb in Hamadan.

== Previous versions ==
The 1971 and 1974 notes bore an image of Iranian ruler Shah Mohammad Reza Pahlavi.

| Year | Image |
|---|---|
| 1971 | |
| 1974 | |
