= Sa'dabad Complex =

Historic palace complex in Tehran, Iran

- Majmue Saadābād
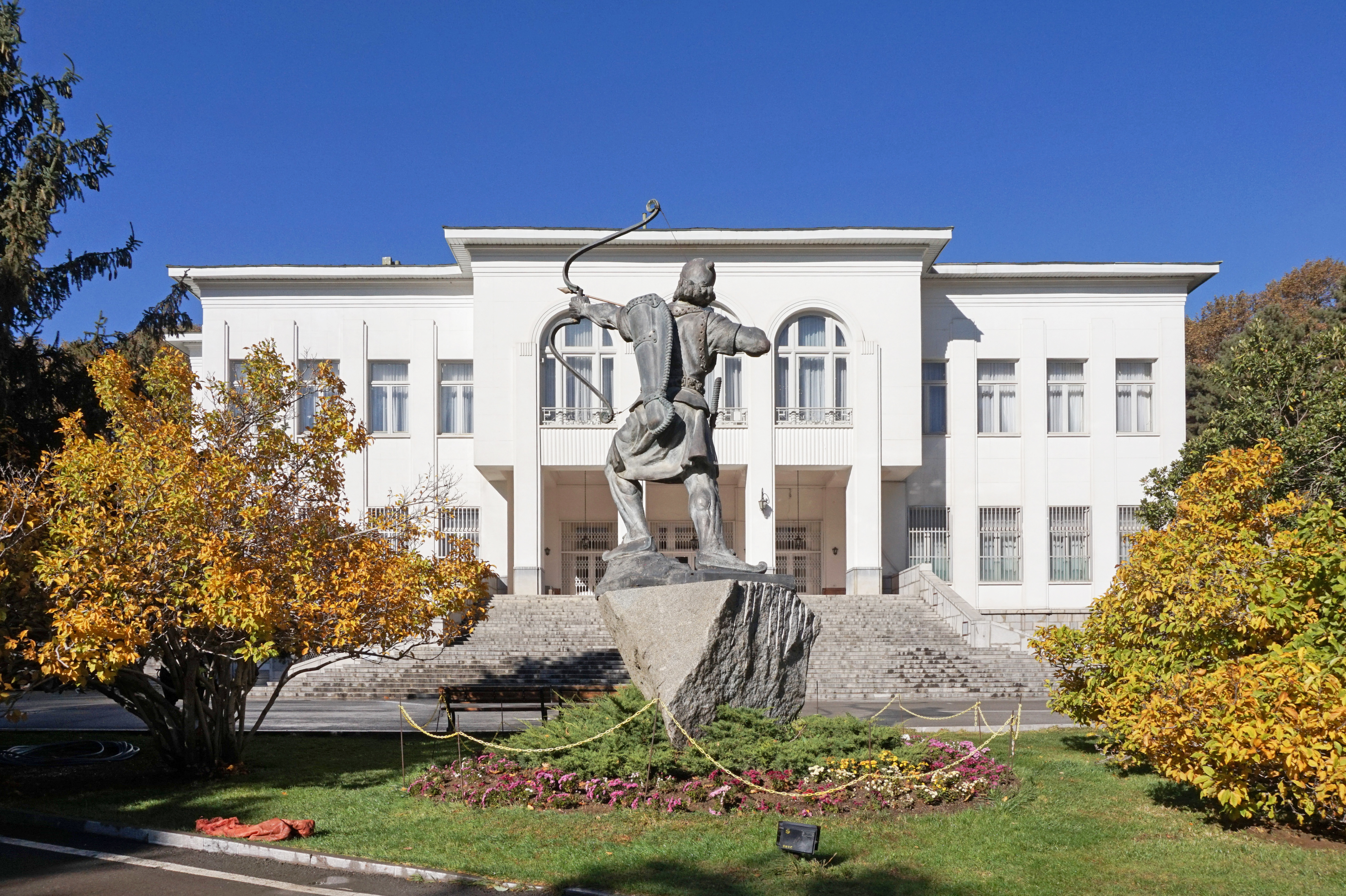
- The White Palace

- Location within Tehran

General information
- Architectural style: Neoclassical
- Location: Darband, Zafaraniyeh, Tajrish, Valiasr Street, Tehran, Iran
- Coordinates: 35°49′02″N 51°25′25″E
- Current tenants: President of Iran
- Construction started: 1921

Design and construction
- Architect: Hossein Behzad

The Sa'dabad Complex (Persian: مجموعه سعدآباد, romanized: Majmue Saadābād) is an 80 hectare complex built by the Qajar and Pahlavi monarchs, located in Shemiran, Greater Tehran, Iran. Today, the official residence of the President of Iran is located adjacent to the complex.

The complex includes natural forest, streets, qanats, galleries, mansions/palaces, and museums.

== History ==
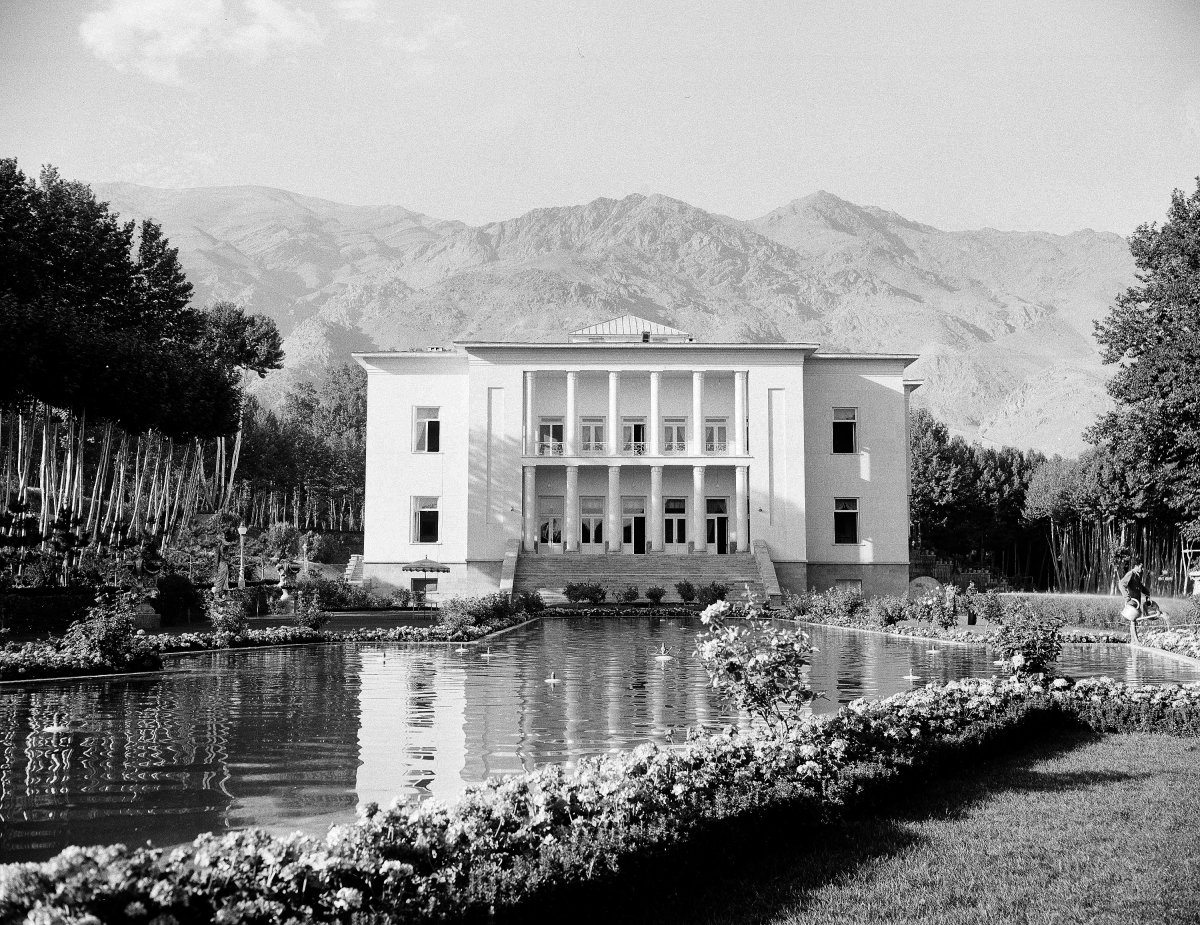
The White Palace in 1952

The complex was initially built and inhabited in the 19th century by the Qajar shahs. After extensive expansions, Reza Shah of the Pahlavi dynasty resided there from the 1920s until his exile in 1941. His son, Mohammad Reza Shah, moved there in the 1970s. In 1978, President Jimmy Carter stayed in the palace during a visit to Iran to guarantee U.S. support for the regime.

After the 1979 Revolution, the complex became a public museum. On 17 March 2026, multiple palaces in the complex were damaged by shockwaves from airstrikes in the 2026 Iran war.

== Present use ==
Large parts of the complex are museums, which are accessible to visitors. Other parts are currently used by the Office of the President of the Islamic Republic of Iran. The complex is operated by the Cultural Heritage Organization of Iran.

== Sites ==
=== Gates to the complex ===
- Nezamie Gate, from which Reza Shah would enter the complex.
- Zaferanie Gate, Currently used by the presidency organization.
- Gate of Darband Street, from which Mohammad Reza Shah would enter the complex.
- Gate of Darband Square
- Ja'far Abad Gate (1st)
- Ja'far Abad Gate (2nd)
- River Gate
- The White House Gate

=== Main buildings ===
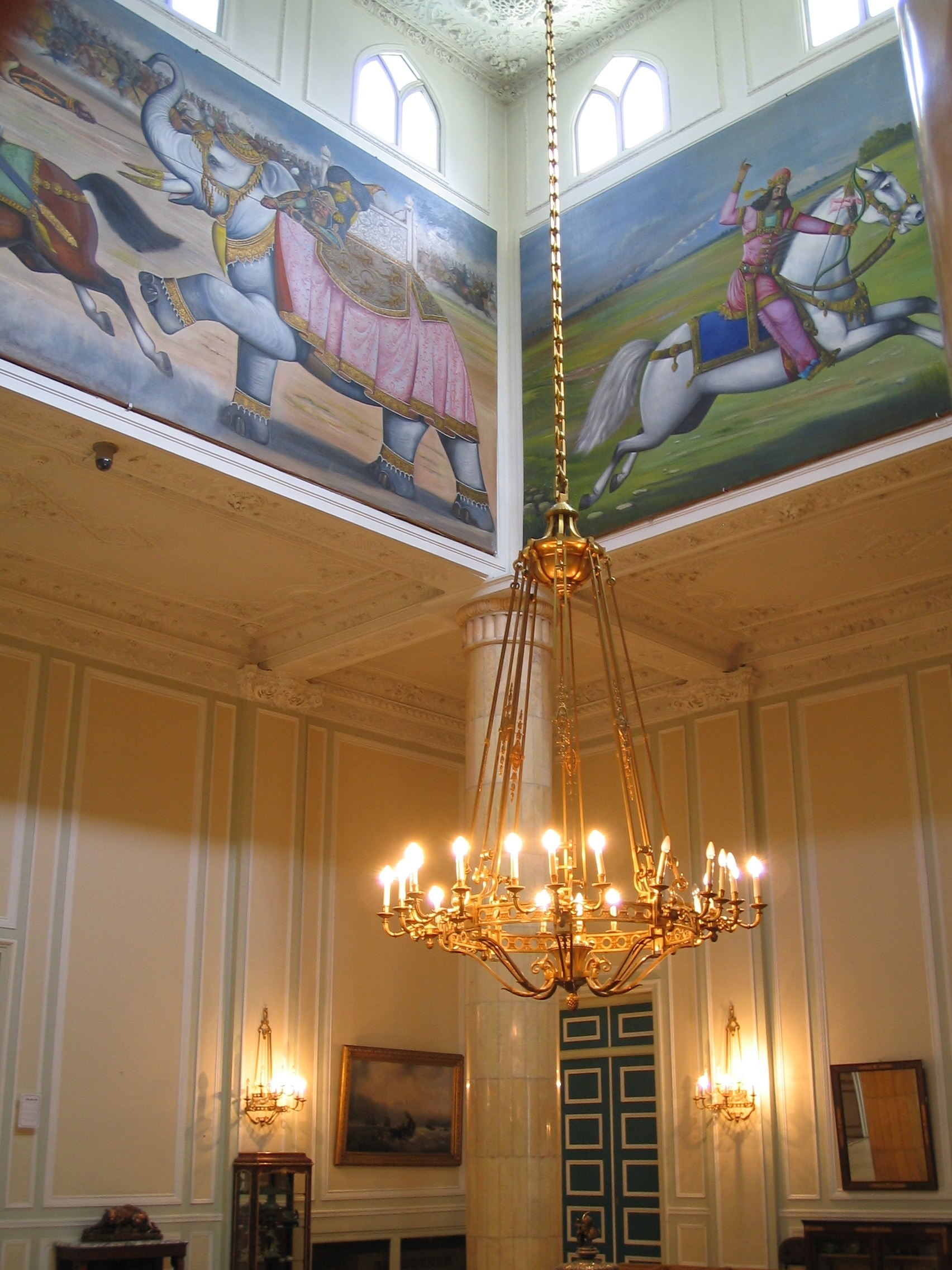
Depictions of Persian mythology in the White Palace

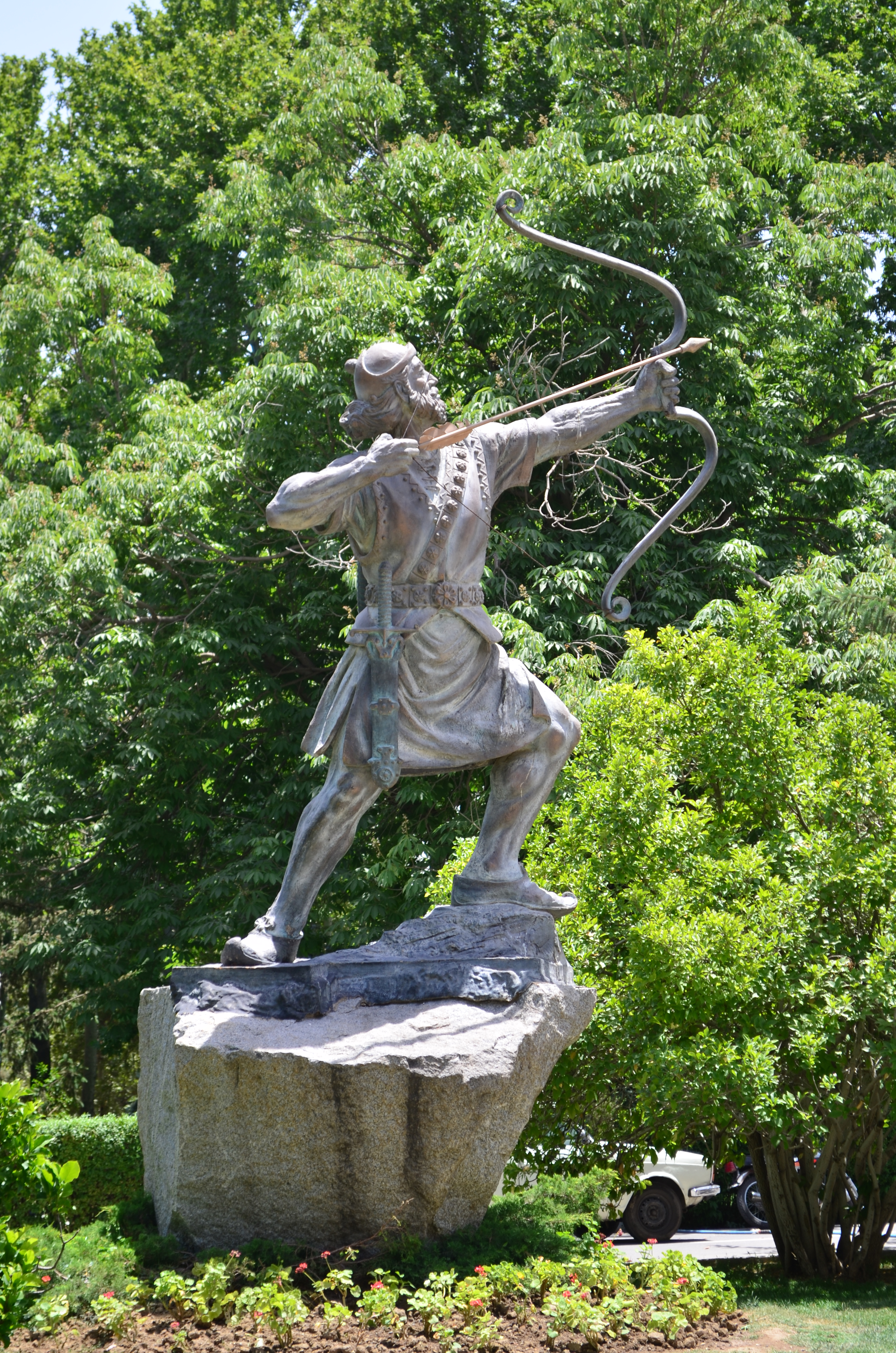
Statue of Arash the Archer

- Ahmad Shah Qajar Palace

(not to be confused with the Pavilion of Ahmad Shah Qajar in the Niavaran Complex)

- The Green Palace

(also known as the Shahvand House)

- The White Palace

The White Palace Museum, former official residence of Shah Mohammad Reza Shah and Shahbanu Farah.

- Museum of Natural History

The Special Palace, currently used by the presidency organization.

- Museum of Fine Arts

The Black Palace

- Museum of Anthropology

Princess Shams' Palace, named after Shams Pahlavi.

- Museum of Glassware and Handicrafts

Princess Ashraf's Palace, named after Ashraf Pahlavi.

- Building of the Amendment 36 (a governmental agency)

Prince Gholam Reza's Palace, named after Gholam Reza Pahlavi.

- Palace of the King's Mother

Currently used by the presidency organization.

- Prince Ahmad Reza's Palace, named after Ahmad Reza Pahlavi.

Currently used by the presidency organization.

- Administration of the complex

Prince Abdol Reza's Palace, named after Abdul Reza Pahlavi.

- The Training Center

Prince Bahman's Palace, named after Gholam Reza Pahlavi's son.

- The Military Museum

Prince Shahram's Palace, named after Ashraf Pahlavi's son.

- Museum of Artistic Creatures

Palace of Farideh Ghotbi, mother of Shahbanu Farah.

- The Behzad Museum

1st Palace of Reza Pahlavi, named after Crown Prince Reza Pahlavi.

- Museum of Treasure (The Dafine Museum)

2nd Palace of Reza Pahlavi, currently used by the presidency organization.

- Museum of Mir Emad Calligraphy

Palace of Princess Farahnaz and Prince Ali Reza, named after Farahnaz Pahlavi and Ali Reza Pahlavi.

- The Abkar Museum

Princess Leila's Palace, named after Leila Pahlavi.

- Omidvar Brothers Museum

Qajar era building keeping the historical artifacts of the Omidvar Brothers, the first Iranian world travelers.

== Palace of the Shah's Mother ==
During the Pahlavi era, Reza Shah's lived here during the final years of his reign before his exile to Mauritius. It was also the residence of Tadj ol-Molouk, Mohammad Reza Shah's mother, until the 1979 Revolution.

This palace is currently in the possession of the Presidential Institution of Iran and is reserved for special guests of the Government of Iran; and for this reason it is also famous as "The Republic Building". This palace is also currently inaccessible to the public.

== The Green Palace ==
The Green Museum Palace has been called "the most beautiful palace in Iran". This palace is important due to its historical and architectural importance. It dates back to the Qajar era and has two styles of Iranian architecture. They called this palace "The Stone Palace" during the reign of Reza Shah and "The Shahvand palace" during the reign of Mohammad Reza Shah; later, it was called "The Green Palace" because of its green façade.

== The White Palace ==
The Palace of the Nation Museum with an area of 7,000 square meters is the largest palace in Sa'dabad complex.

Until after the 1979 revolution and the transfer of the complex to the Cultural Heritage Organization, it was renamed "The Palace of the Nation Museum" (Mellat museum in Persian). The construction of the palace began in the early Pahlavi era.

== Gallery ==
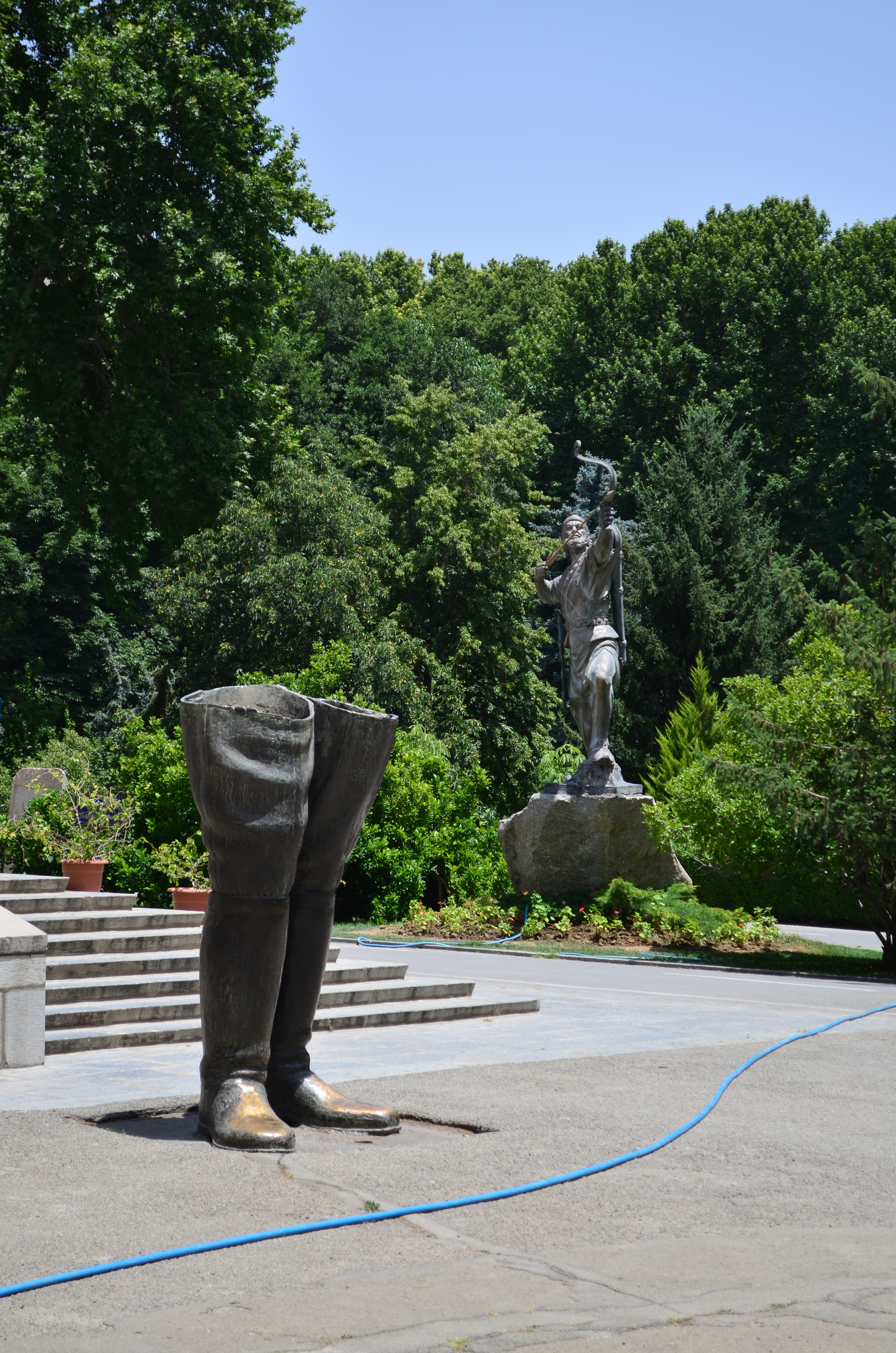
Statue of the Shah's Legs

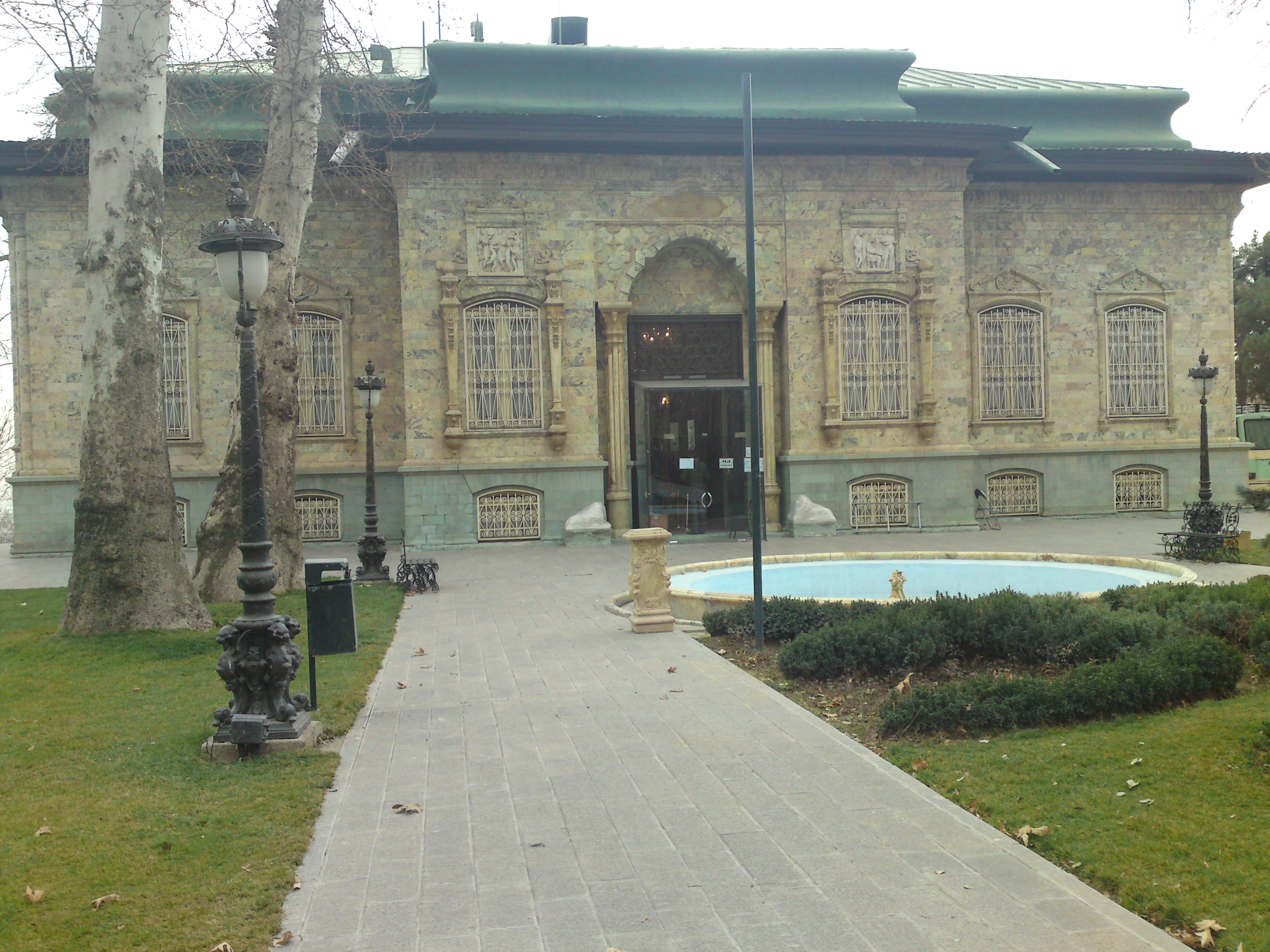
The Green Palace

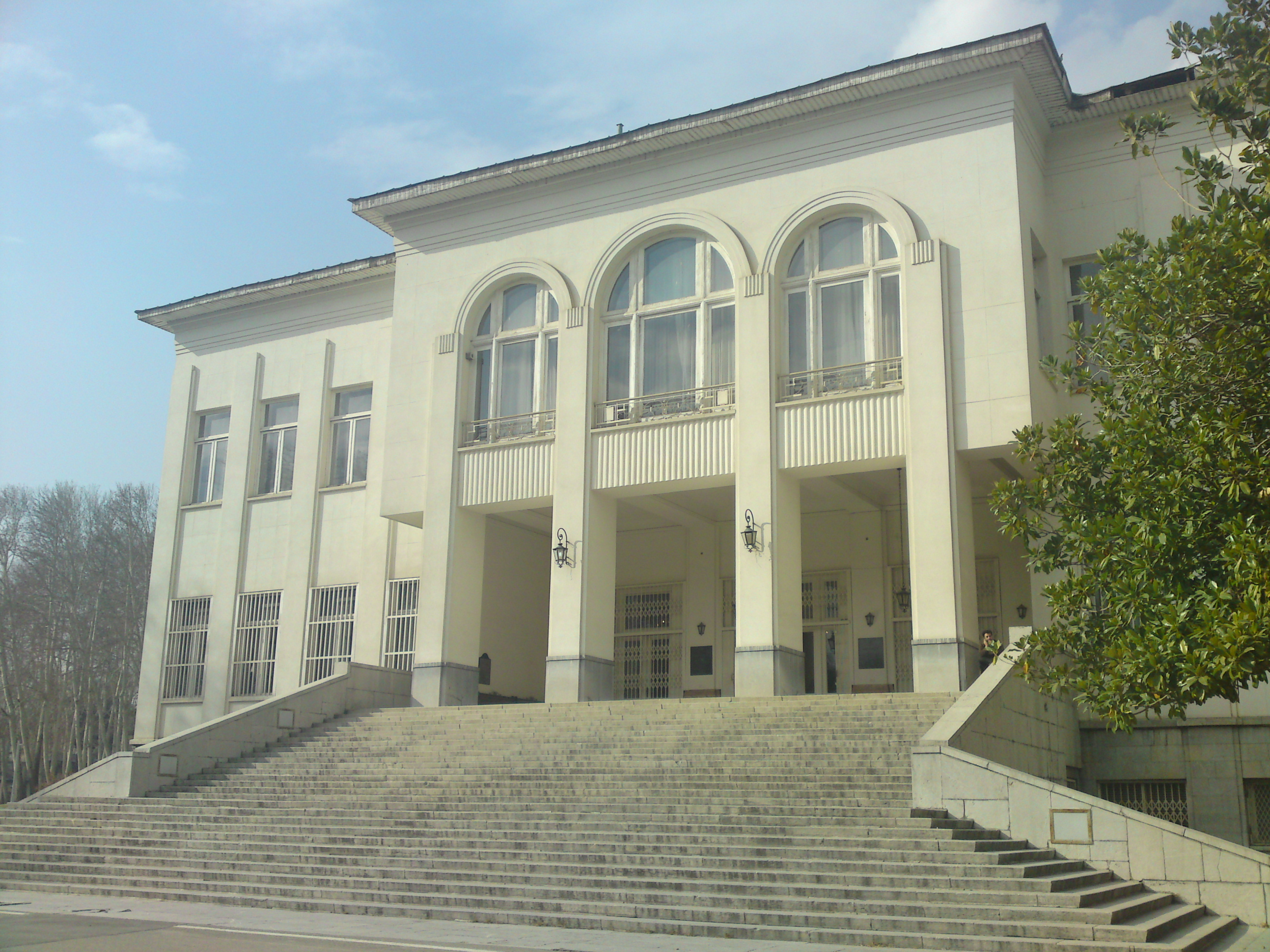
The White Palace

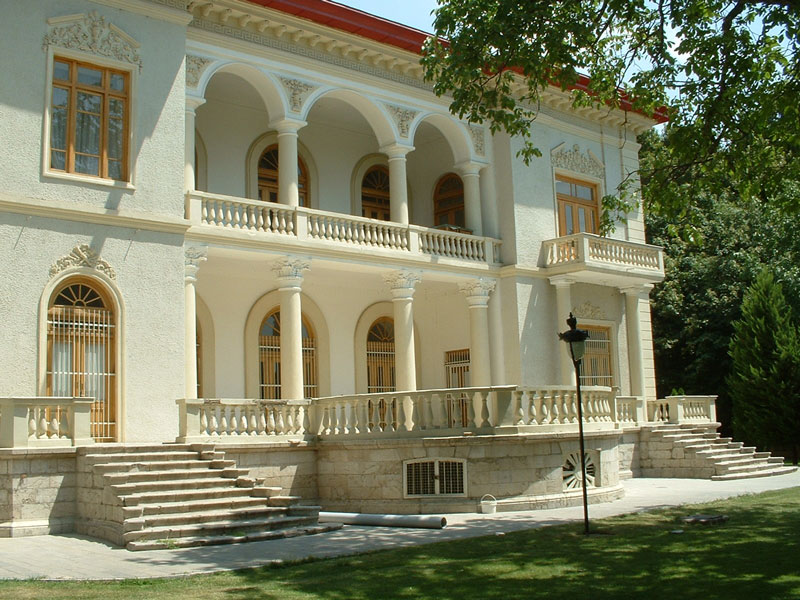
Princess Shams' Palace

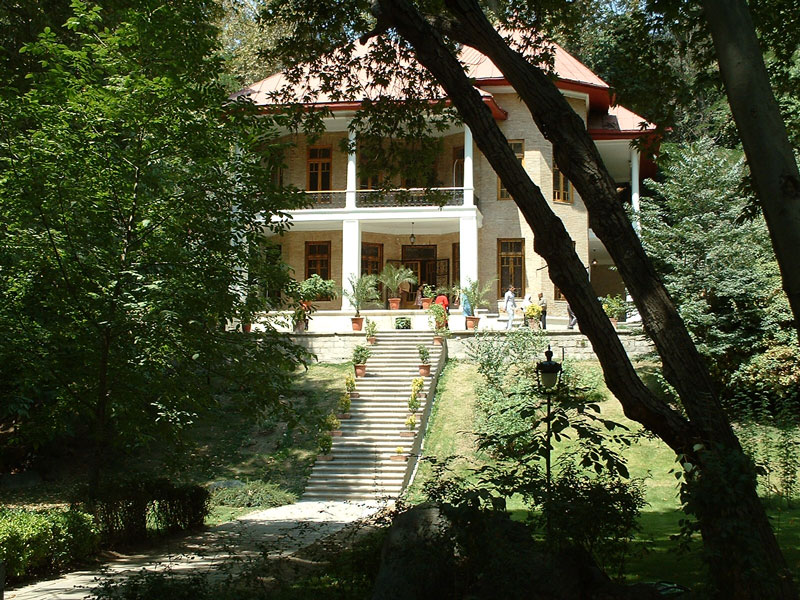
Prince Bahman's Palace

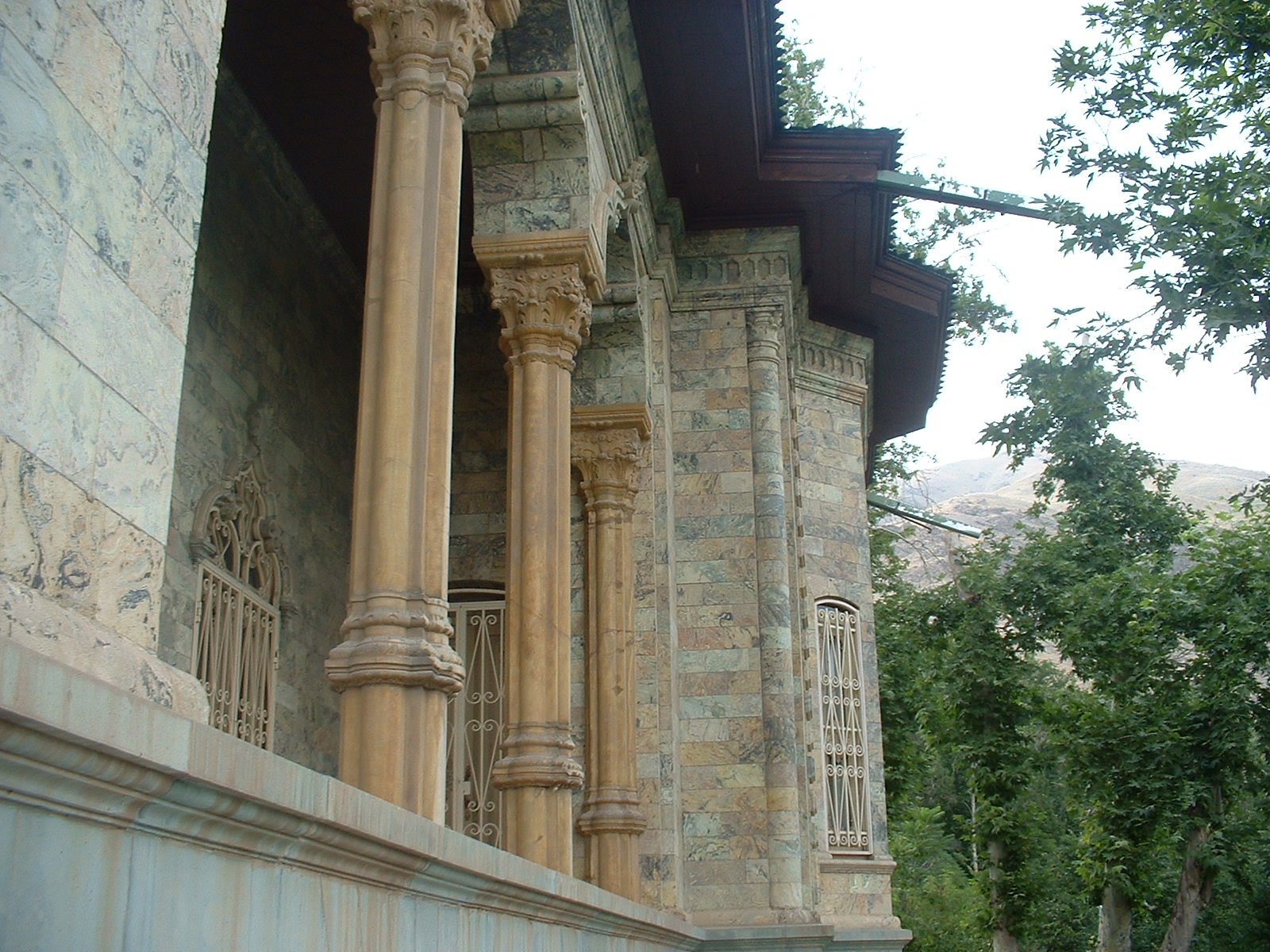
Side view of the Green Palace

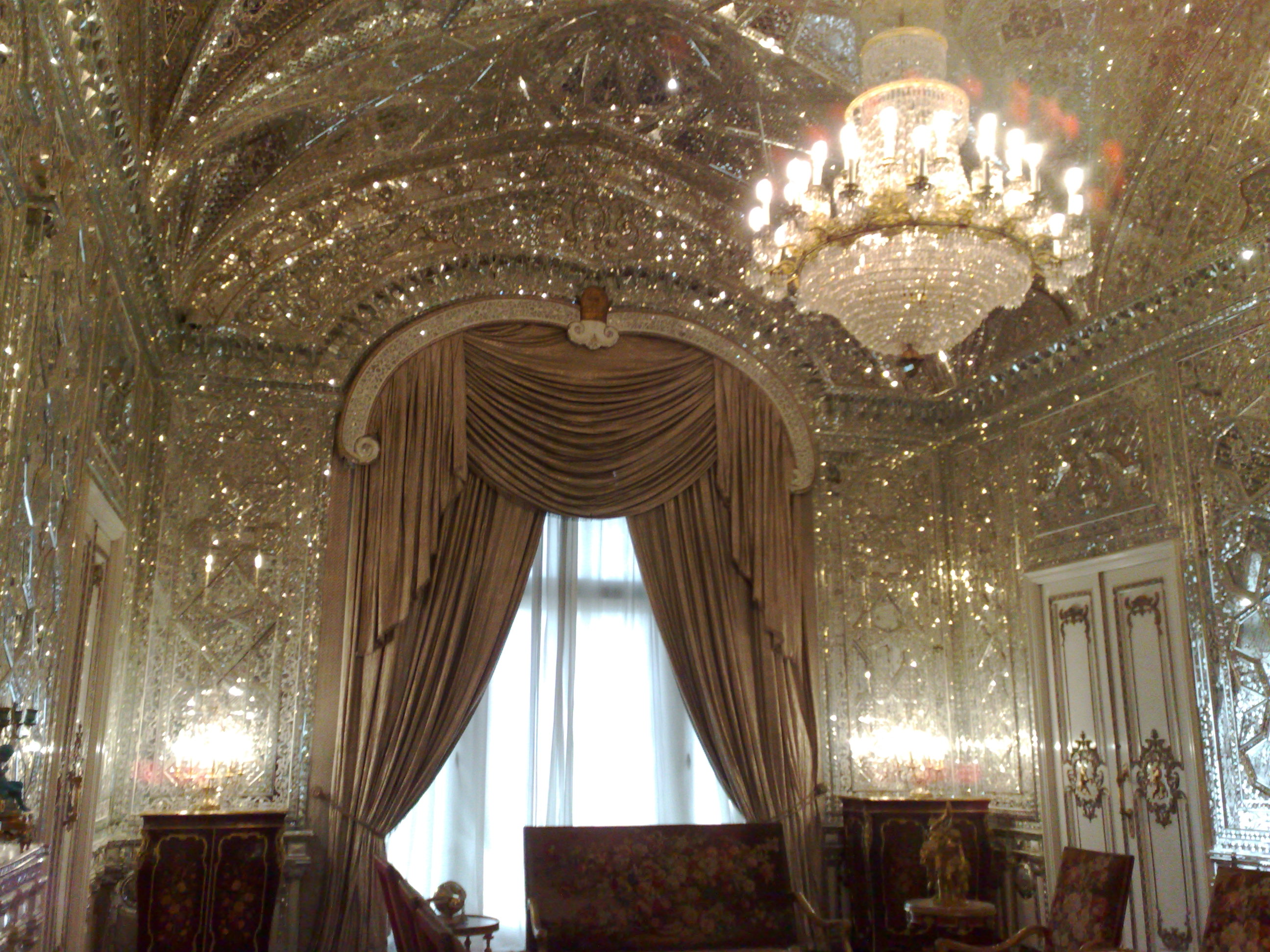
Ayeneh-kari in the Mirror Hall of the Green Palace

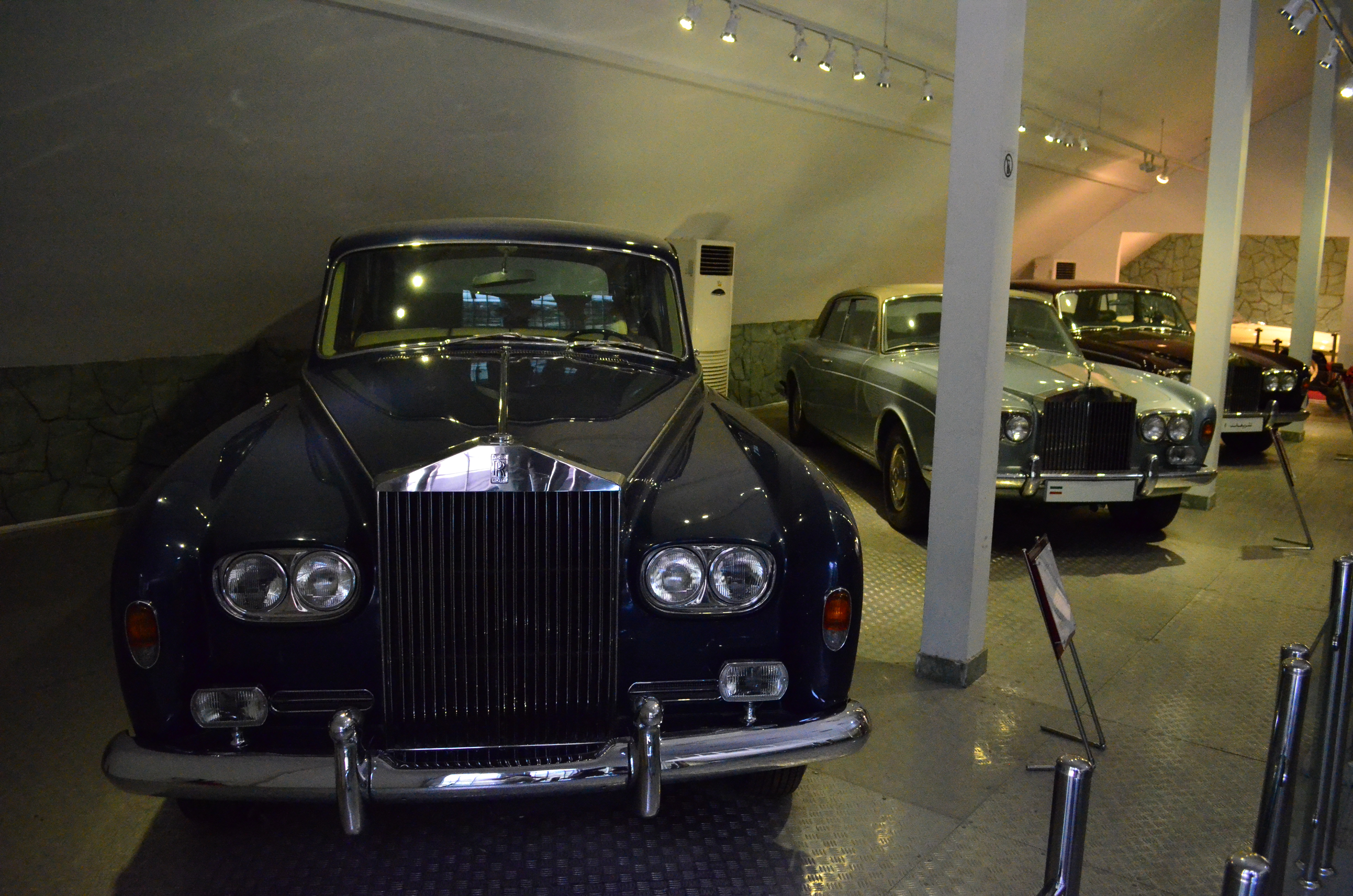
Section of the Imperial cars

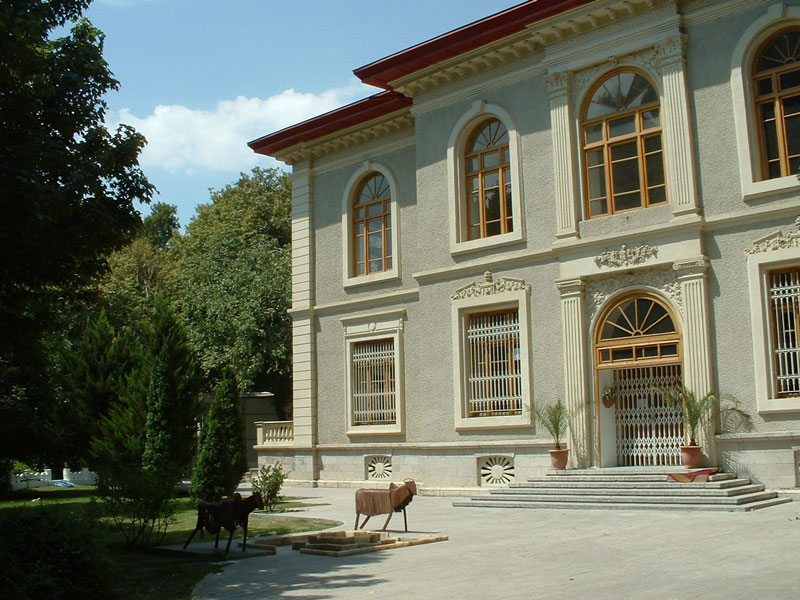
Museum of the Royal Clothes

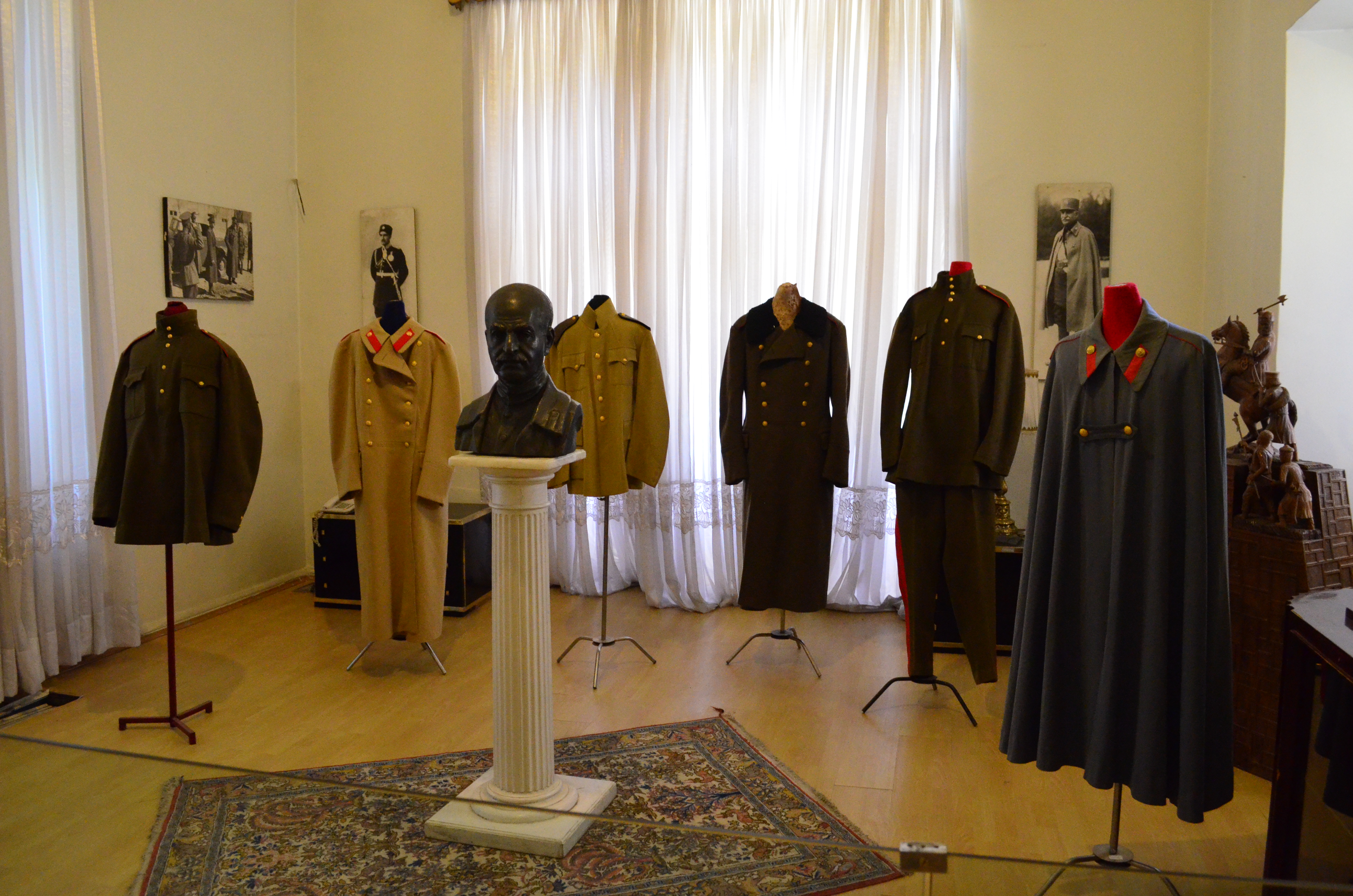
Section of Reza Shah's clothes

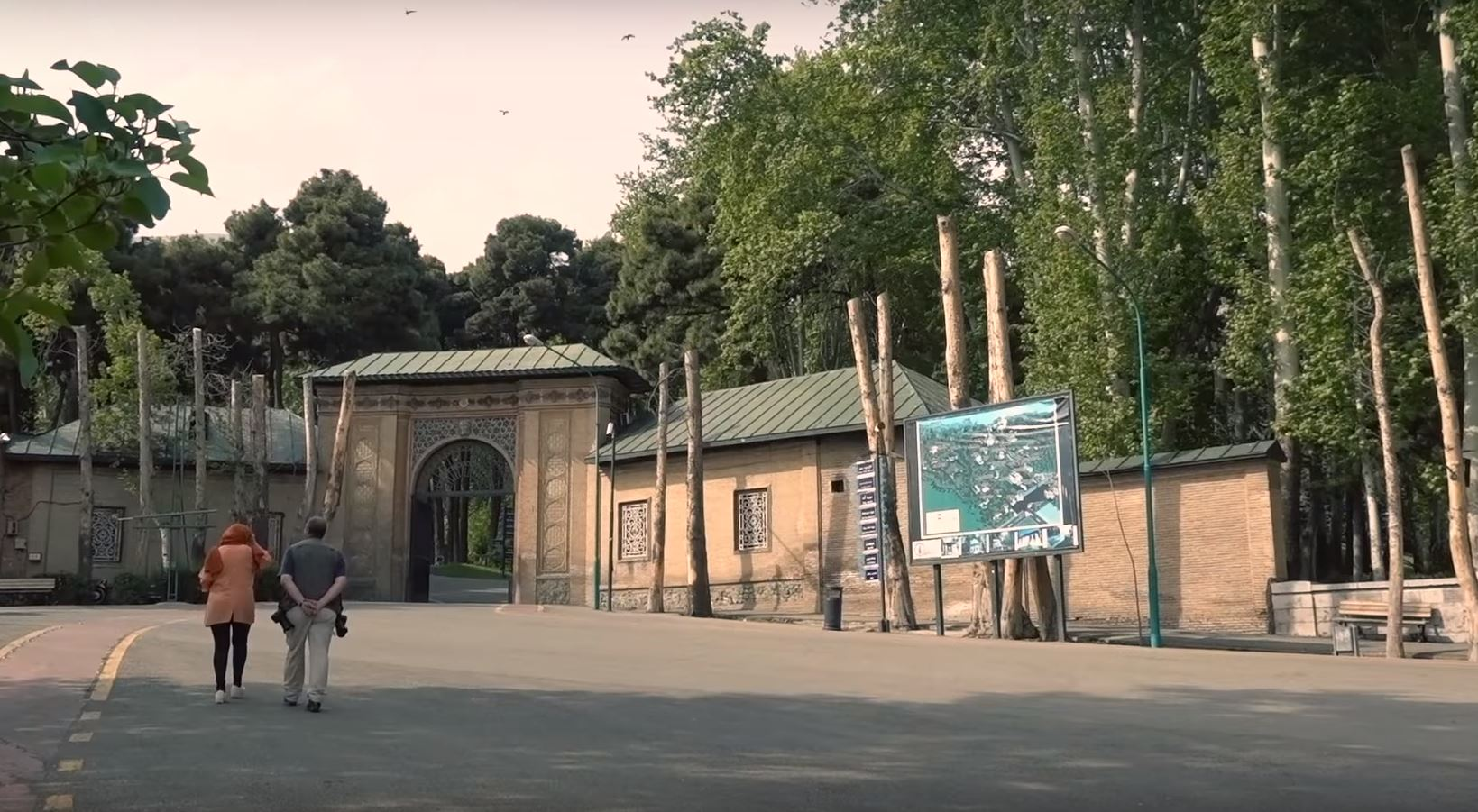
Sa'adabad Gate

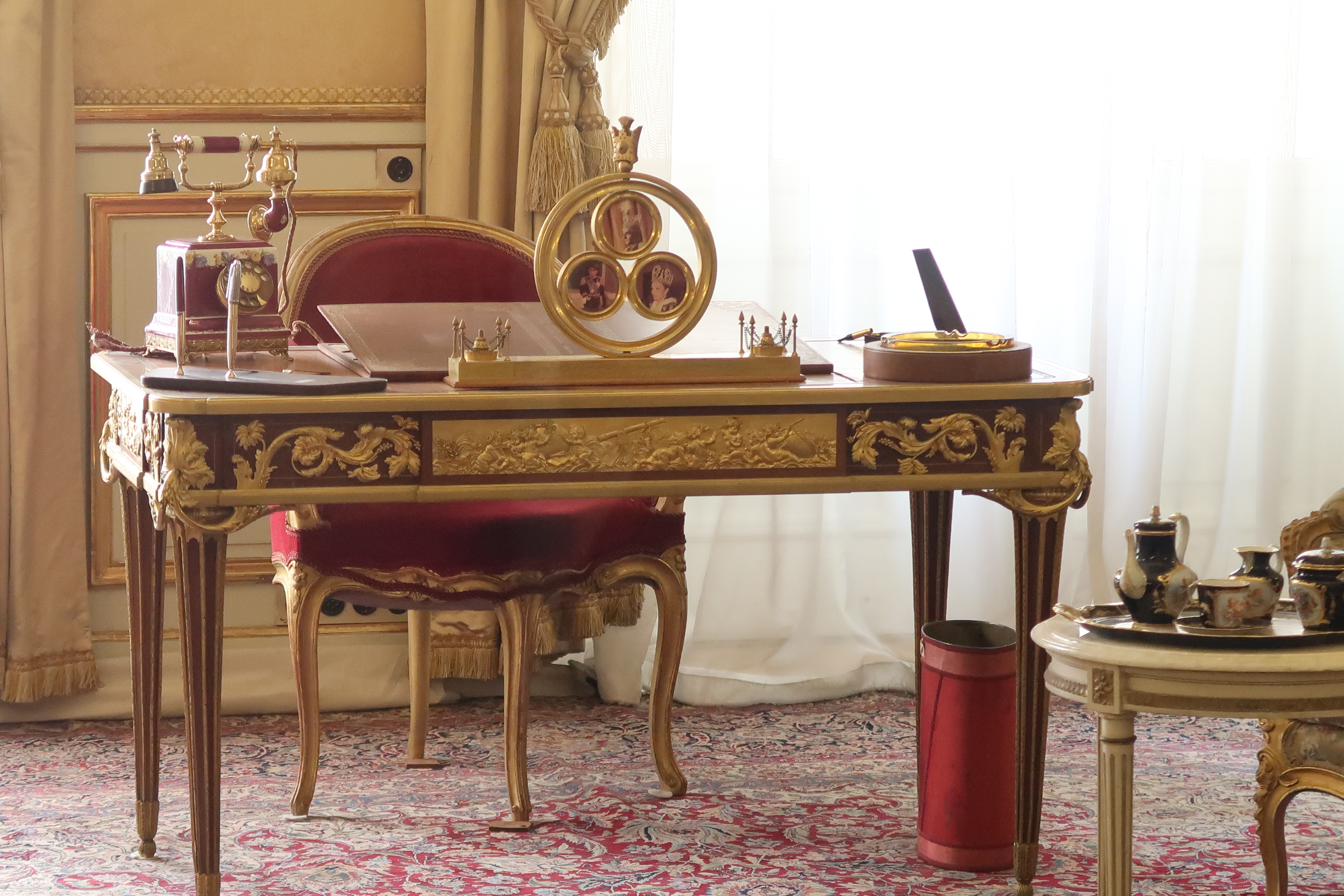
Personal desk

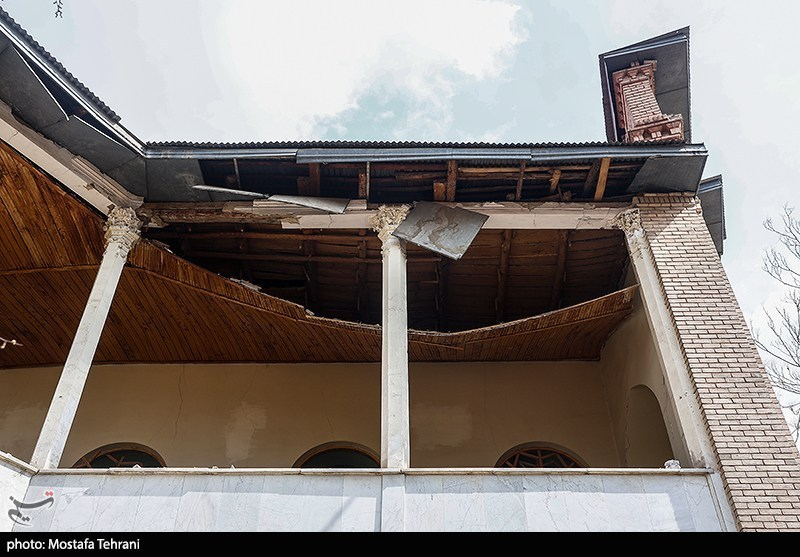
Damages from airstrike shockwaves in the 2026 Iran war
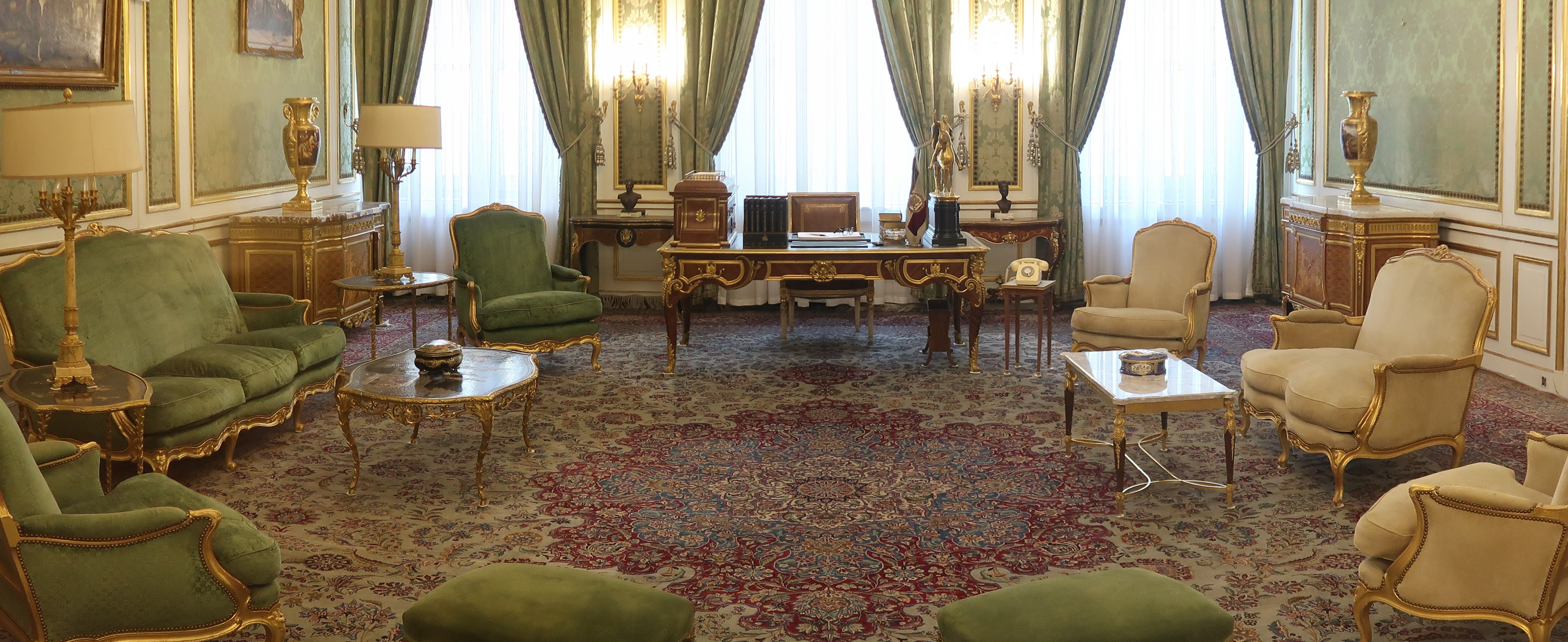
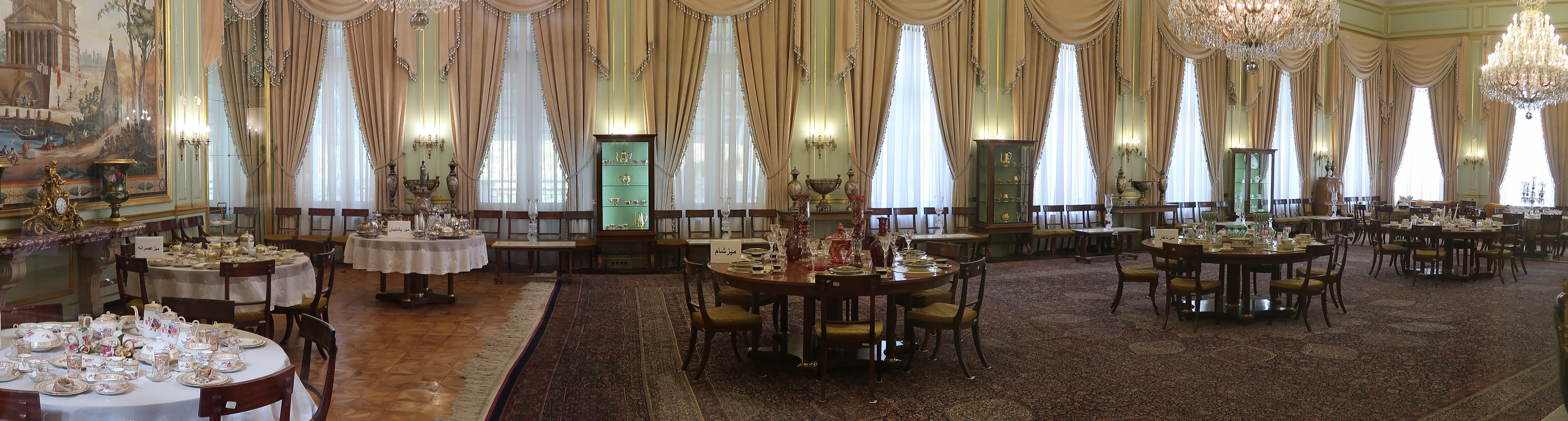

== See also ==
- Niavaran Complex
- Treaty of Saadabad
- Pahlavi Iran
- Pahlavi dynasty
- Iranian architecture
- Presidential palace
