= Abdullah Ommidvar =

Iranian-Chilean film director and producer (1932–2022)

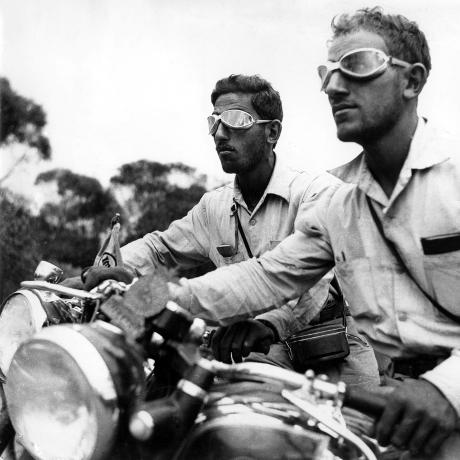
- Issa Omidvar and his brother Abdullah Omidvar
- Born: 29 September 1932; Tehran, Iran
- Died: 14 July 2022 (aged 89); Santiago de Chile
- Occupations: Film director; screenwriter; producer

Abdullah Ommidvar Farhadi (Tehran, 29 September 1932 - Santiago, 14 July 2022) was an Iranian-Chilean anthropologist, filmmaker, and director who spent much of his career in Chile.

== Career ==
Ommidvar studied cultural anthropology at the University of Tehran.In 1954 Abdullah and his brother Issa started a world trip first on motorbikes and later in a Citroën 2CV, that lasted over 10 years and lead them to the Arctic, the Andes, and the African continent to meet remote civilizations.

In 1964 Abdullah migrated to Chile to become an iconic figure in Chilean cinema through his company Arauco Films.

The Omidvar Brothers Museum in the Sa'dabad Complex at Tehran is keeping some historical artifacts of the brothers' world travel.

== Filmography ==
- 1988: Consuelo
- 1990: La niña en la palomera
- 1993: Johnny 100 Pesos
- 1995: La rubia de Kennedy
- 1998: Gringuito
- 2000: Coronation
- 2000: Mi famosa desconocida
