= Ahmad Shahi Pavilion =

Building in Niavaran Palace Complex, Tehran, Iran

Coordinates: 35°48′39″N 51°28′18″E

- کوشک احمدشاهی
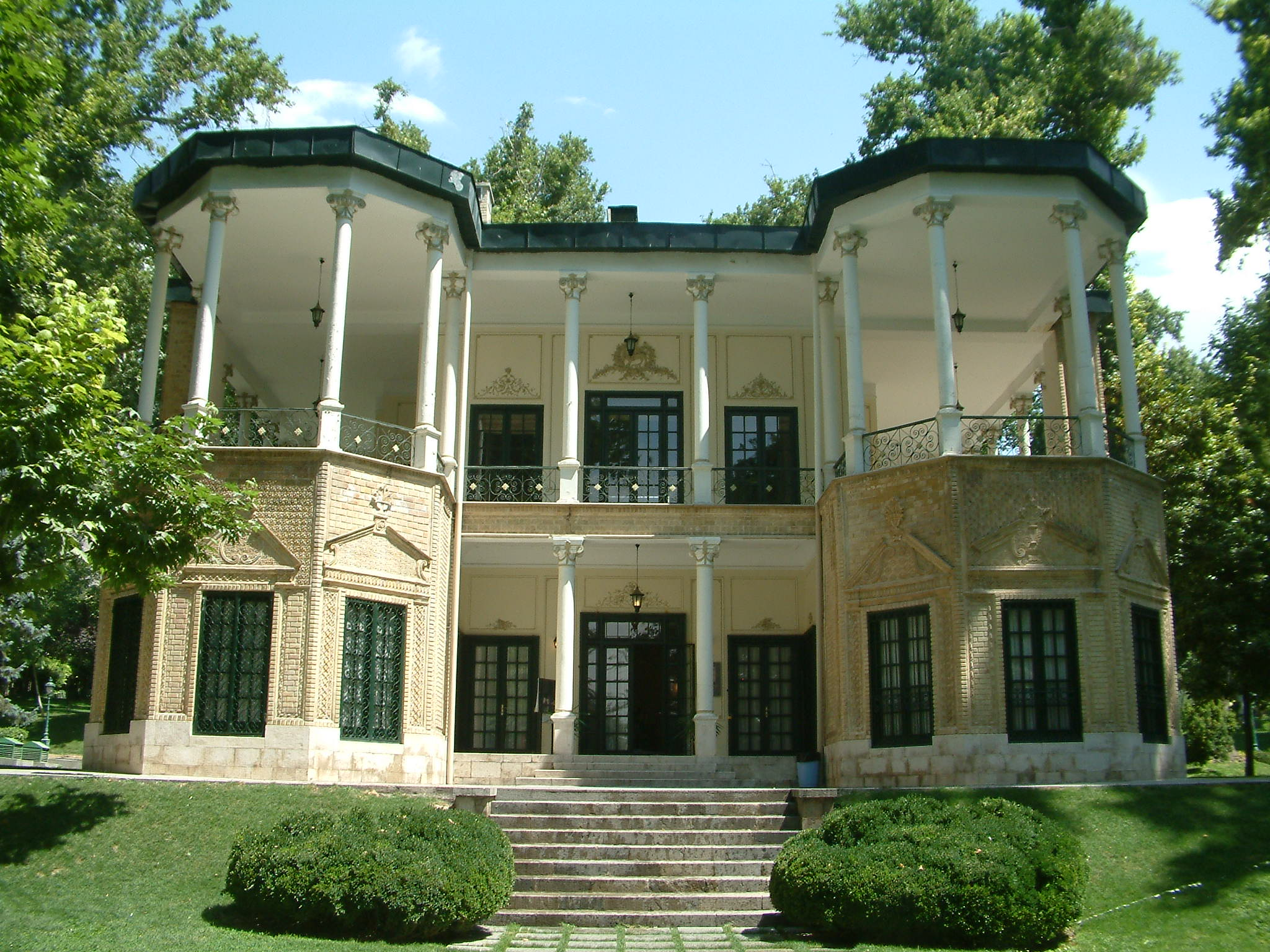
- Interactive map of the Ahmad Shahi Pavilion area

General information
- Architectural style: Qajaresque Neo-Baroque architecture
- Location: Tehran

Ahmad Shahi Pavilion (Persian: کوشک احمدشاهی, romanized: Koushk-e Ahmad Shāhi) is located in Niavaran Palace Complex in northern Tehran, Iran. The Ahmad Shahi Pavilion is beside Mohammad Reza Pahlavi's dwelling, Niavaran Palace and the oldest building there, the Sahebgharaniyeh Palace. The Pavilion was built at the end of the Qajar era as Ahmad Shah's dwelling in Niavaran garden. The Ahmad Shahi Pavilion was constructed in the 1910s as a two-story building in the surrounds of 800 m^{2} (8,600 sq ft) of land.

The Ahmad Shahi pavilion, after refurbishment and interior additions, was utilized as the house and workplace of Mohammad Reza Pahlavi. The first floor of the pavilion includes a hallway with a pond made of marble stone in the middle with six rooms and two corridors around. Ornamental items made of silver, bronze, ivory, wood and souvenirs from different countries such as India, paintings, medals, etc. have been exhibited in this palace. Also other items plus decorative mineral stones, a stone from Moon, different plant and animal fossils are kept in this pavilion.

The second floor of this building includes a middle hallway and a four-sided veranda. All around the major hall, which was used as the song room, wooden shelves have been set. Surrounding the veranda, shelter is provided by six square brick columns and 26 round gypsum columns. The gypsum work pattern of lion and sun can be visible on the northern wall of the veranda. Ahmad Shahi Pavilion is open to public visitors.

== Gallery ==
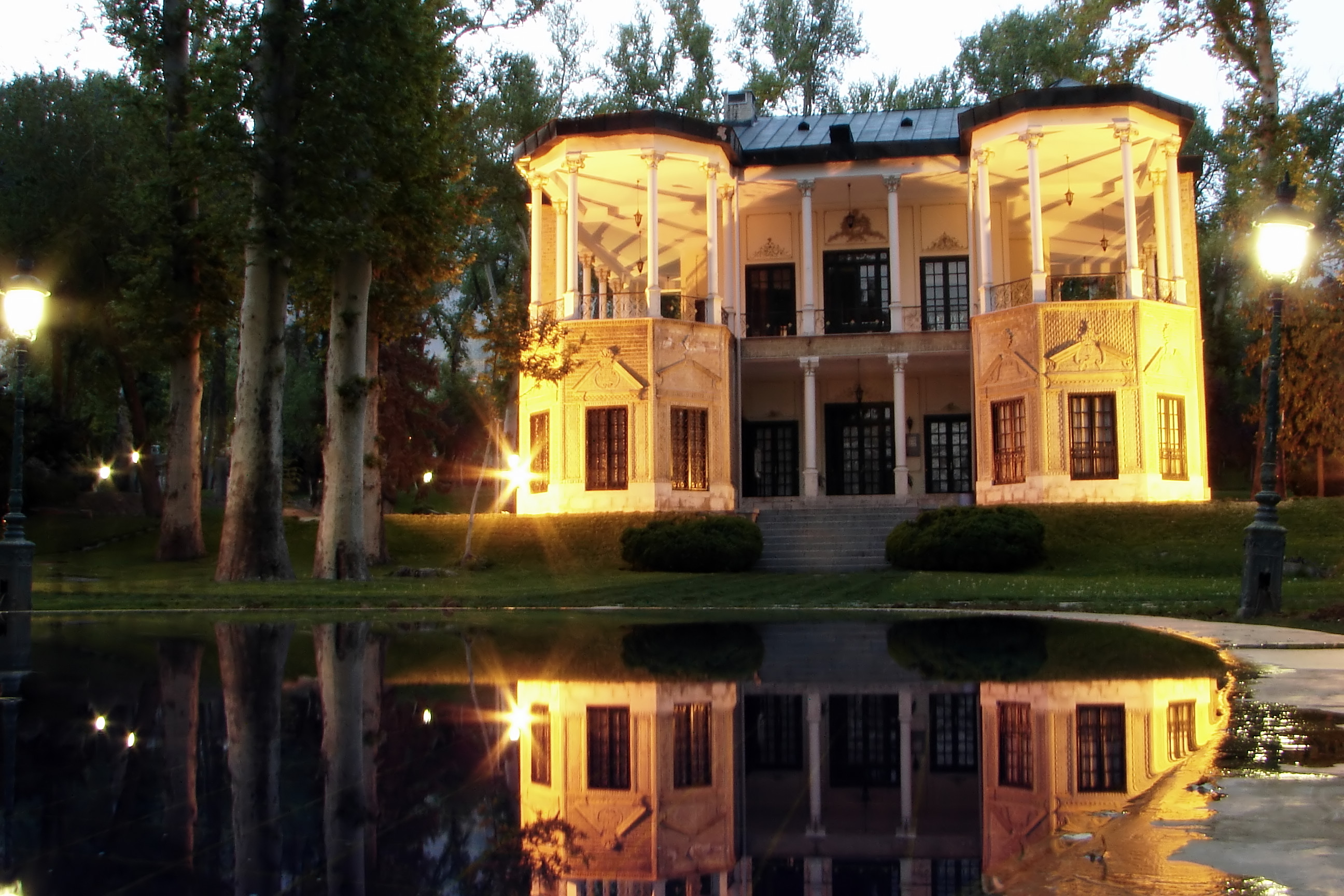
A night view of the palace

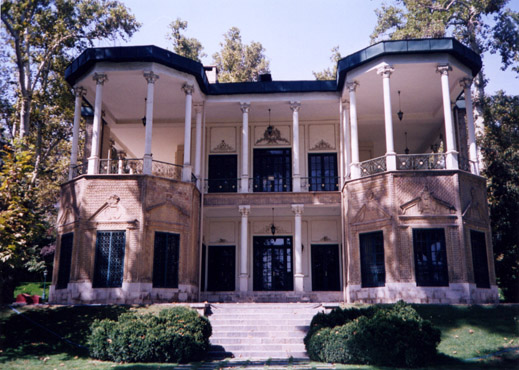
View of the palace

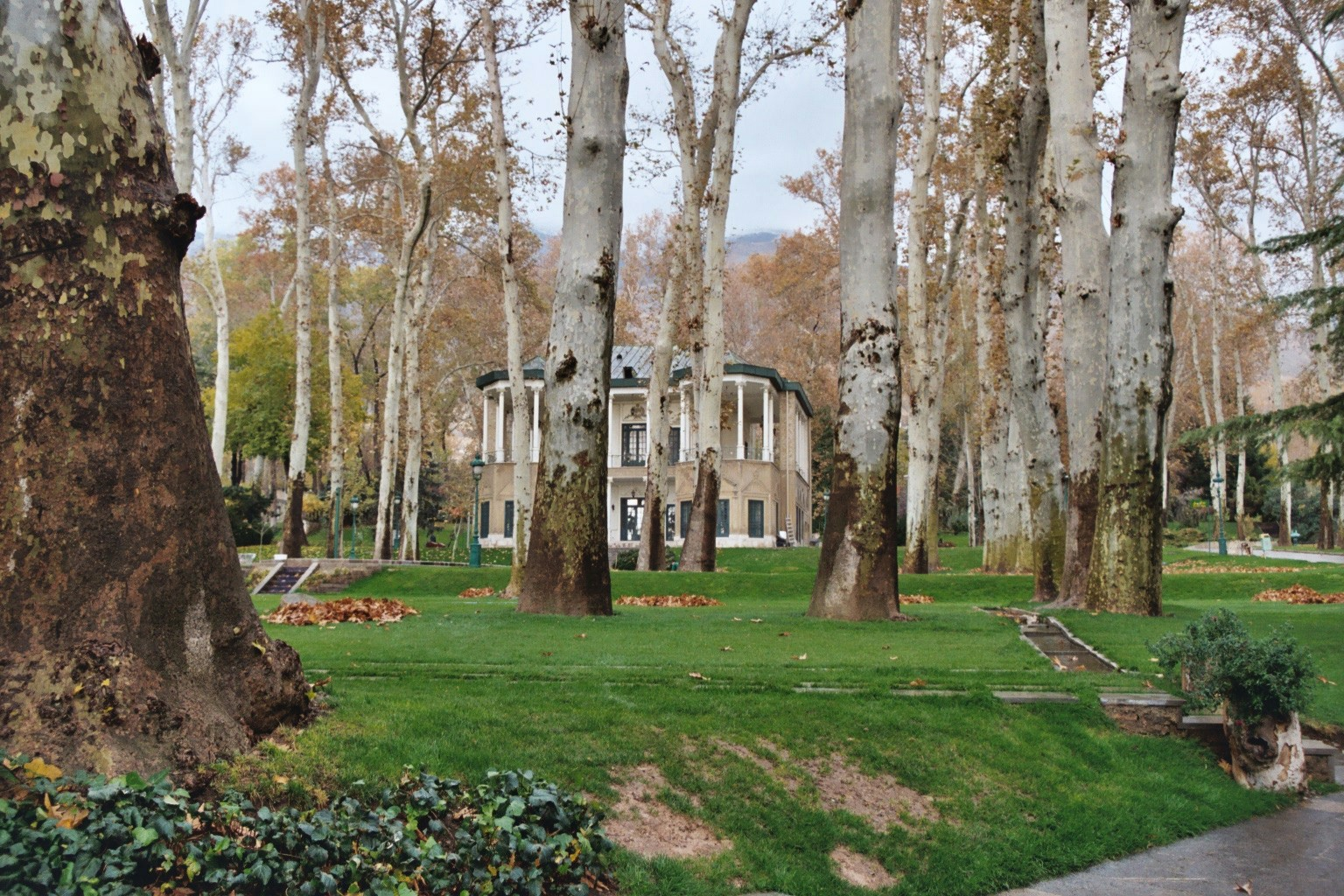
The Ahmad Pavilion and landscape — seen from the garden of the Niavaran Palace complex

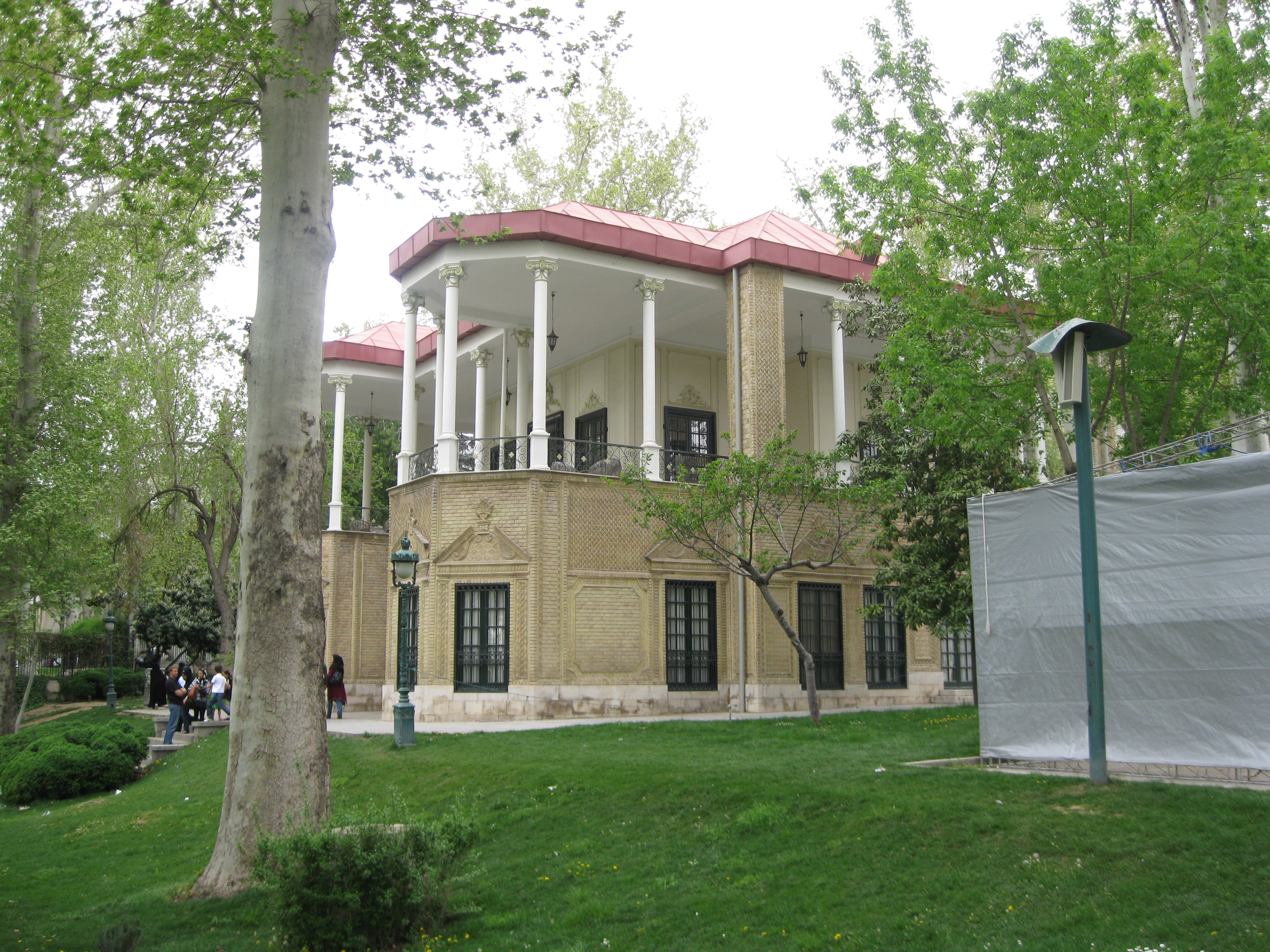

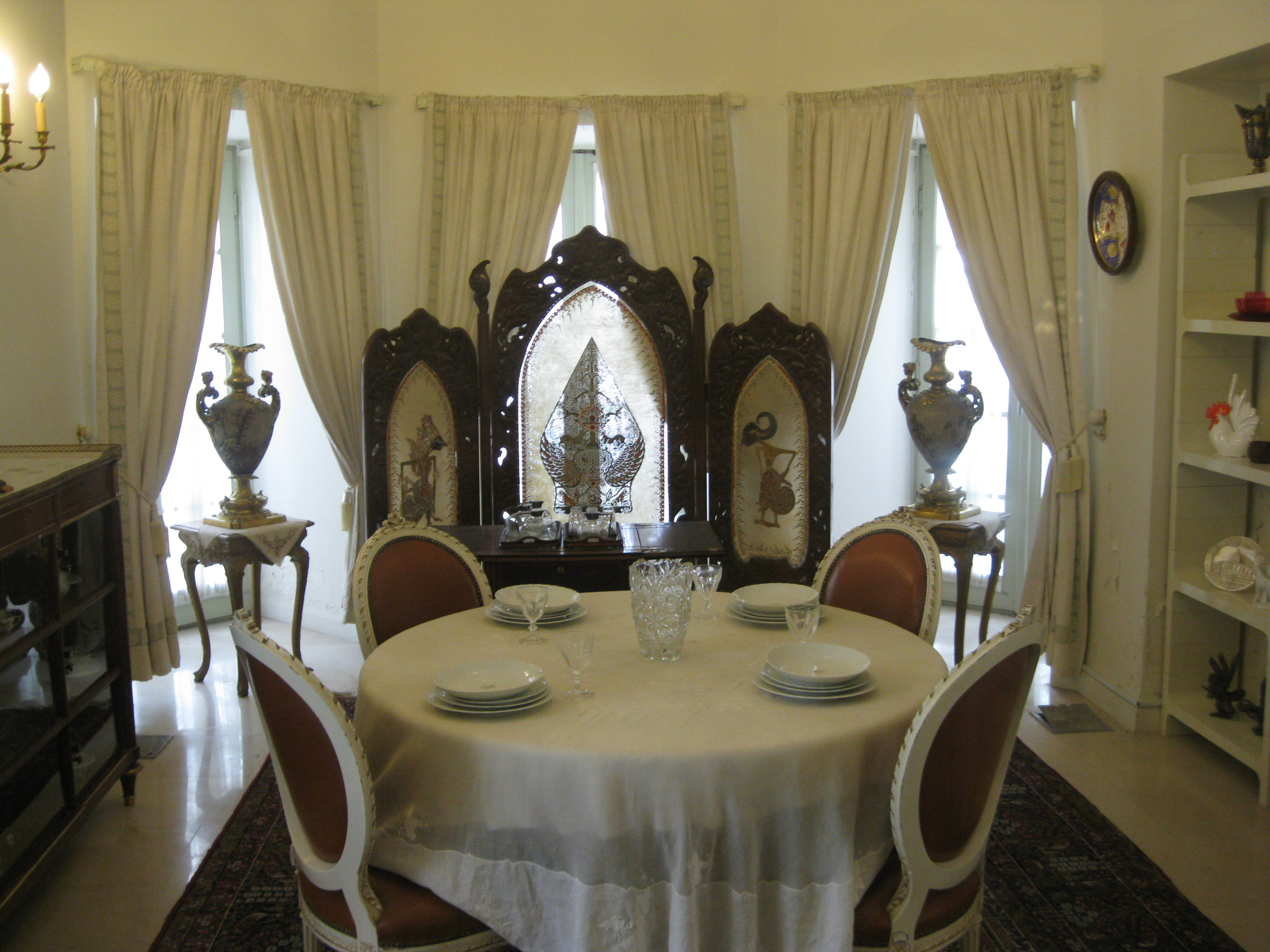
Dining room

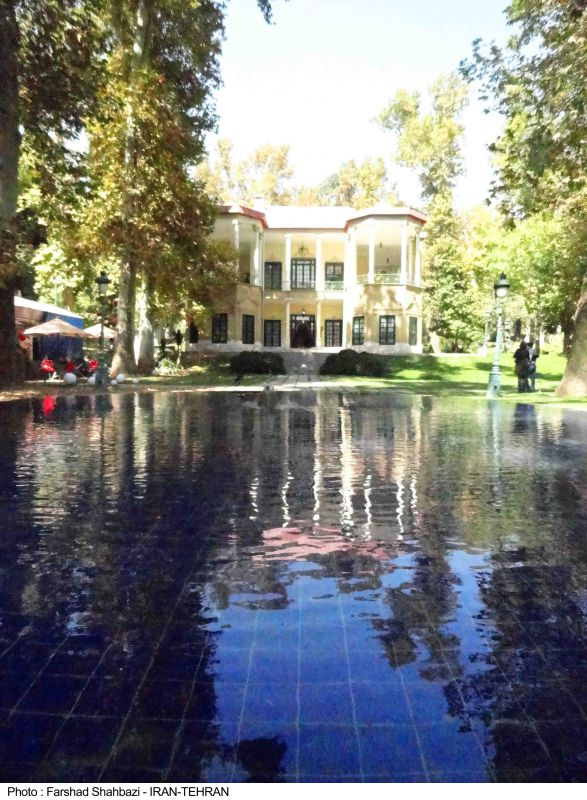
Exterior view and pool

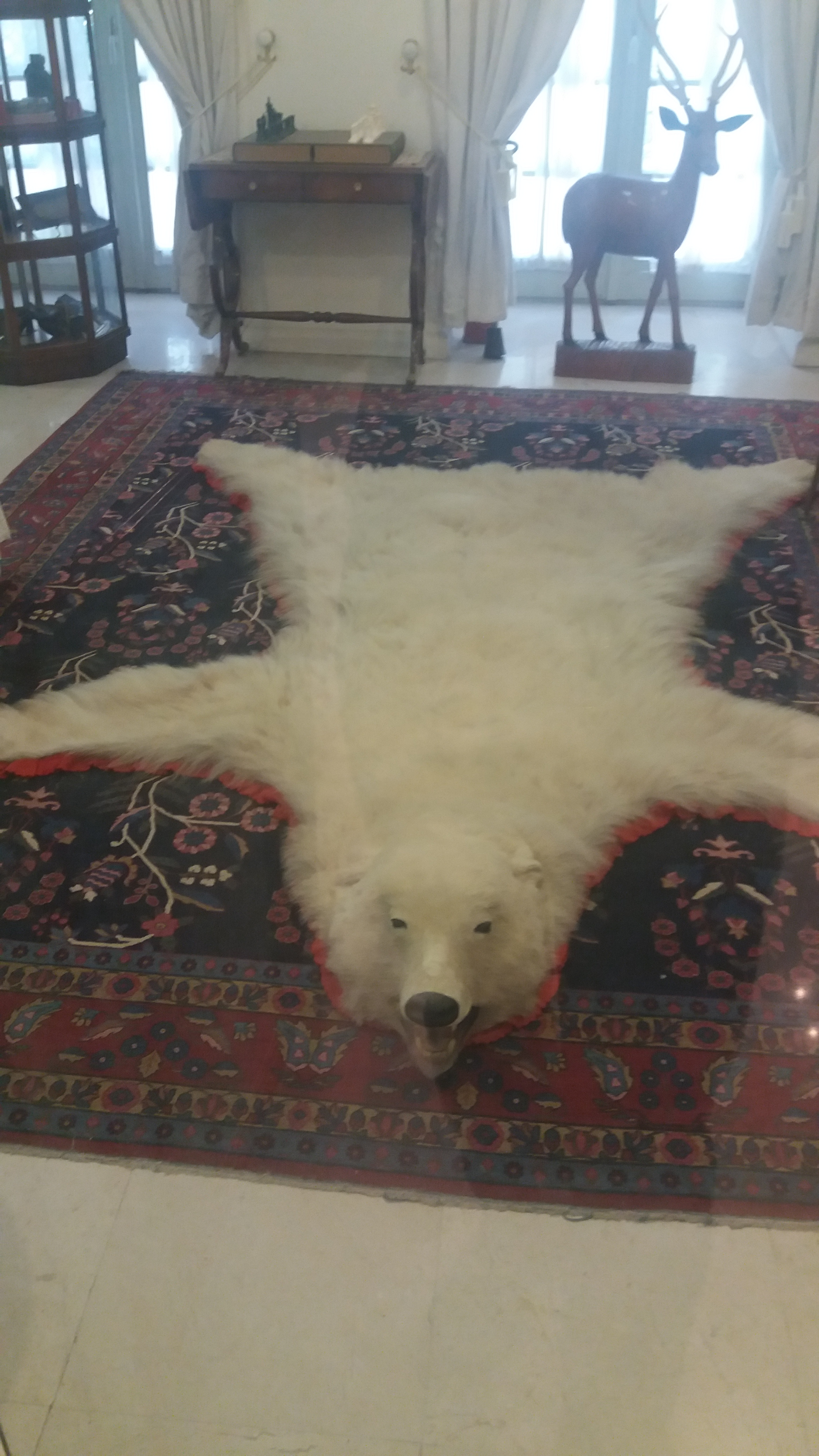
Polar bear skin in one of the rooms

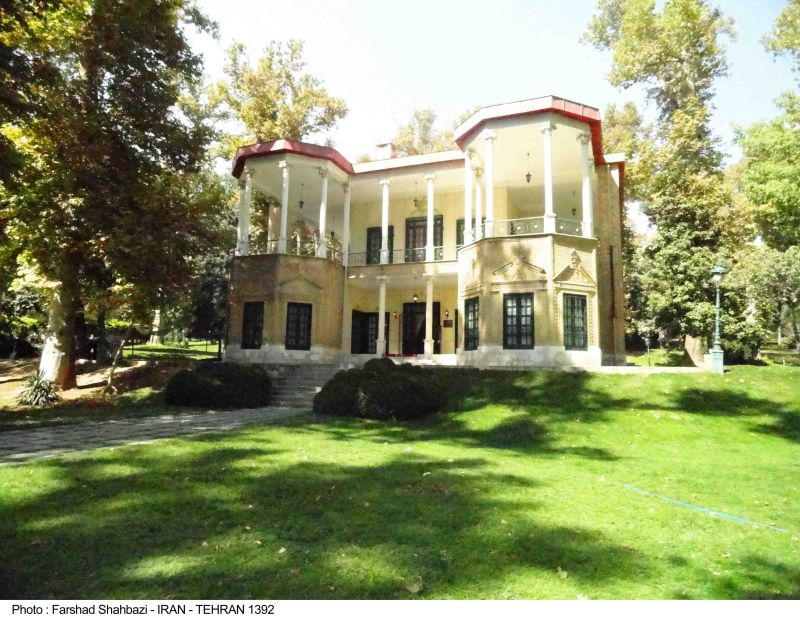

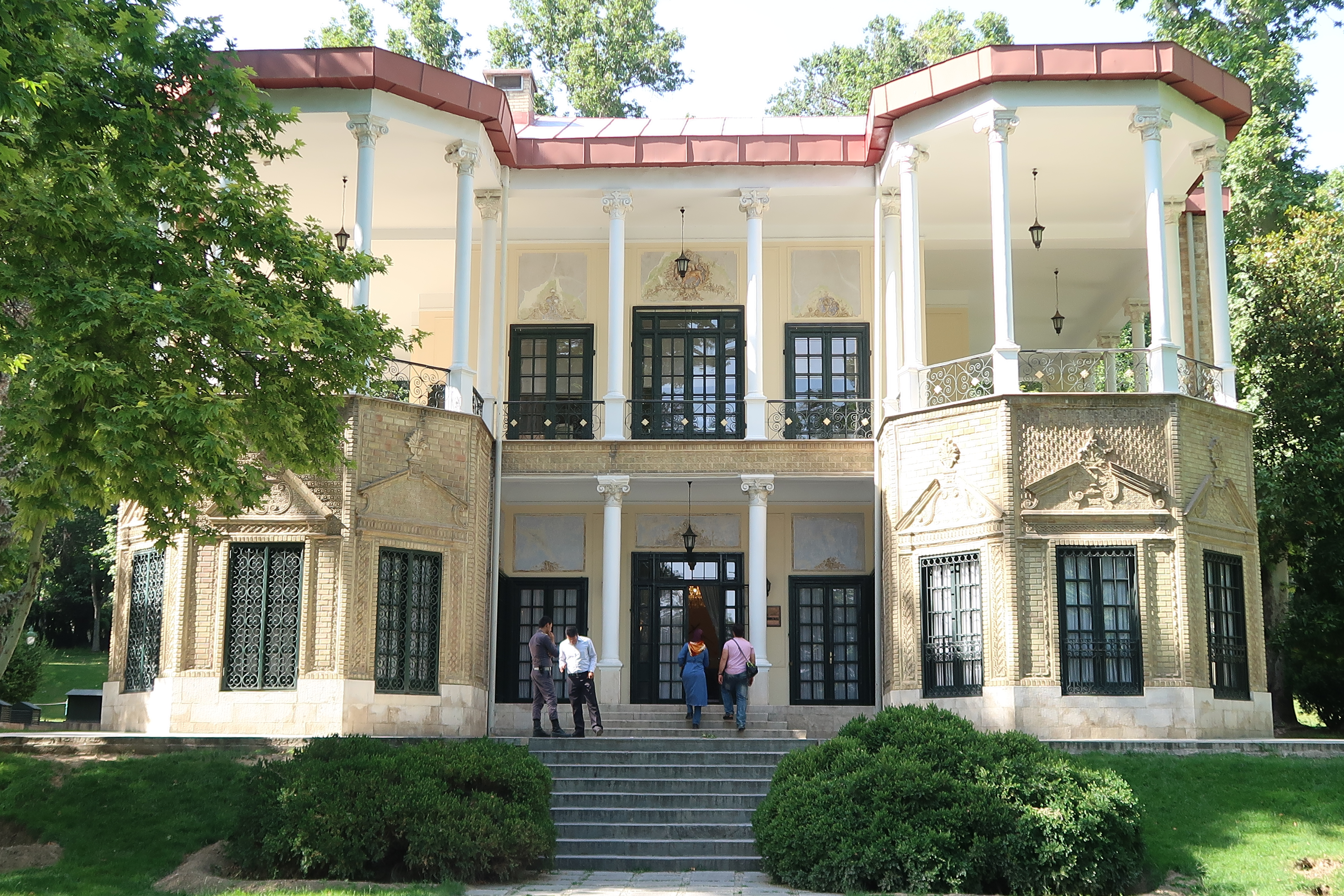
Exterior view

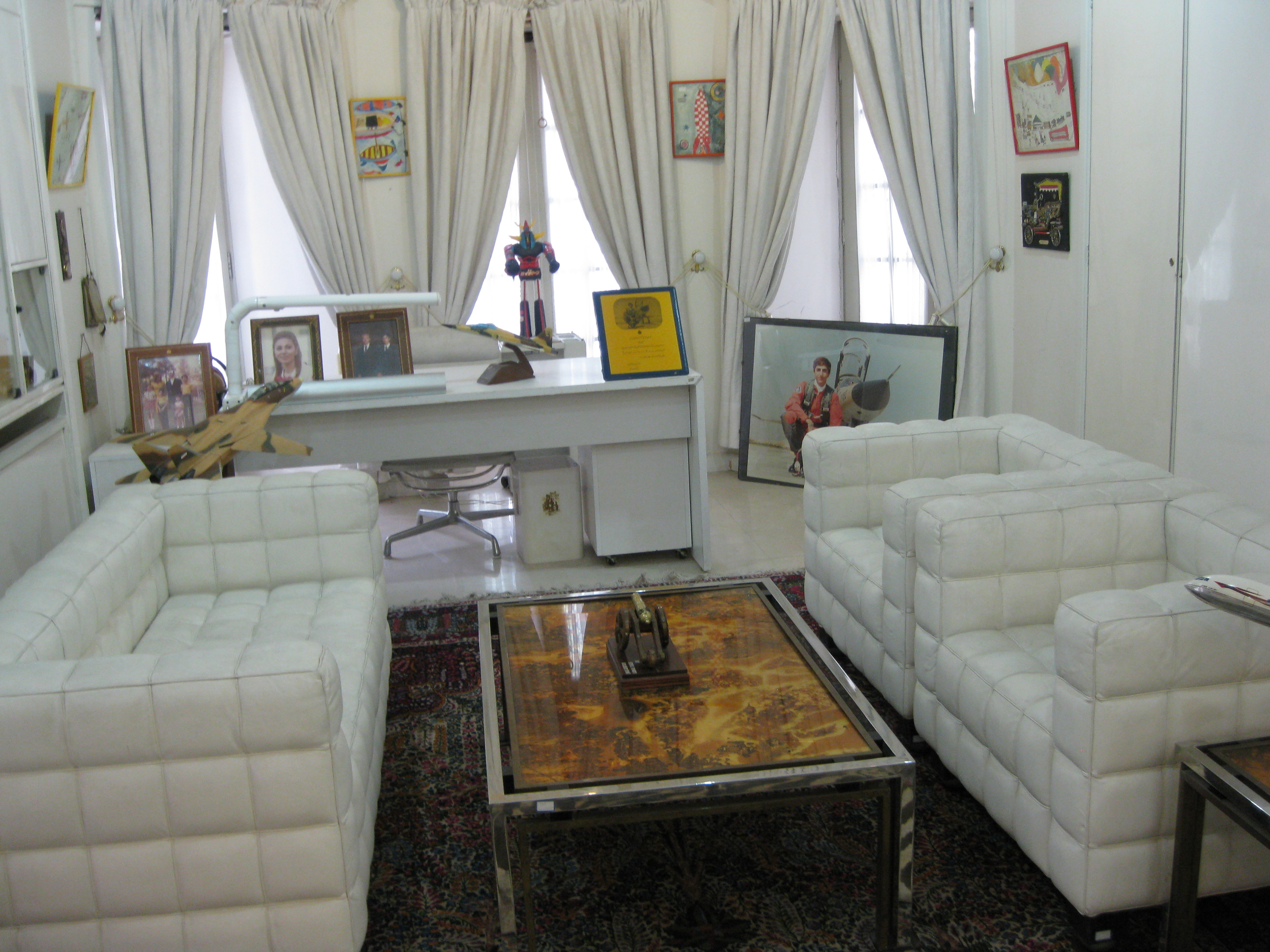
Sitting room

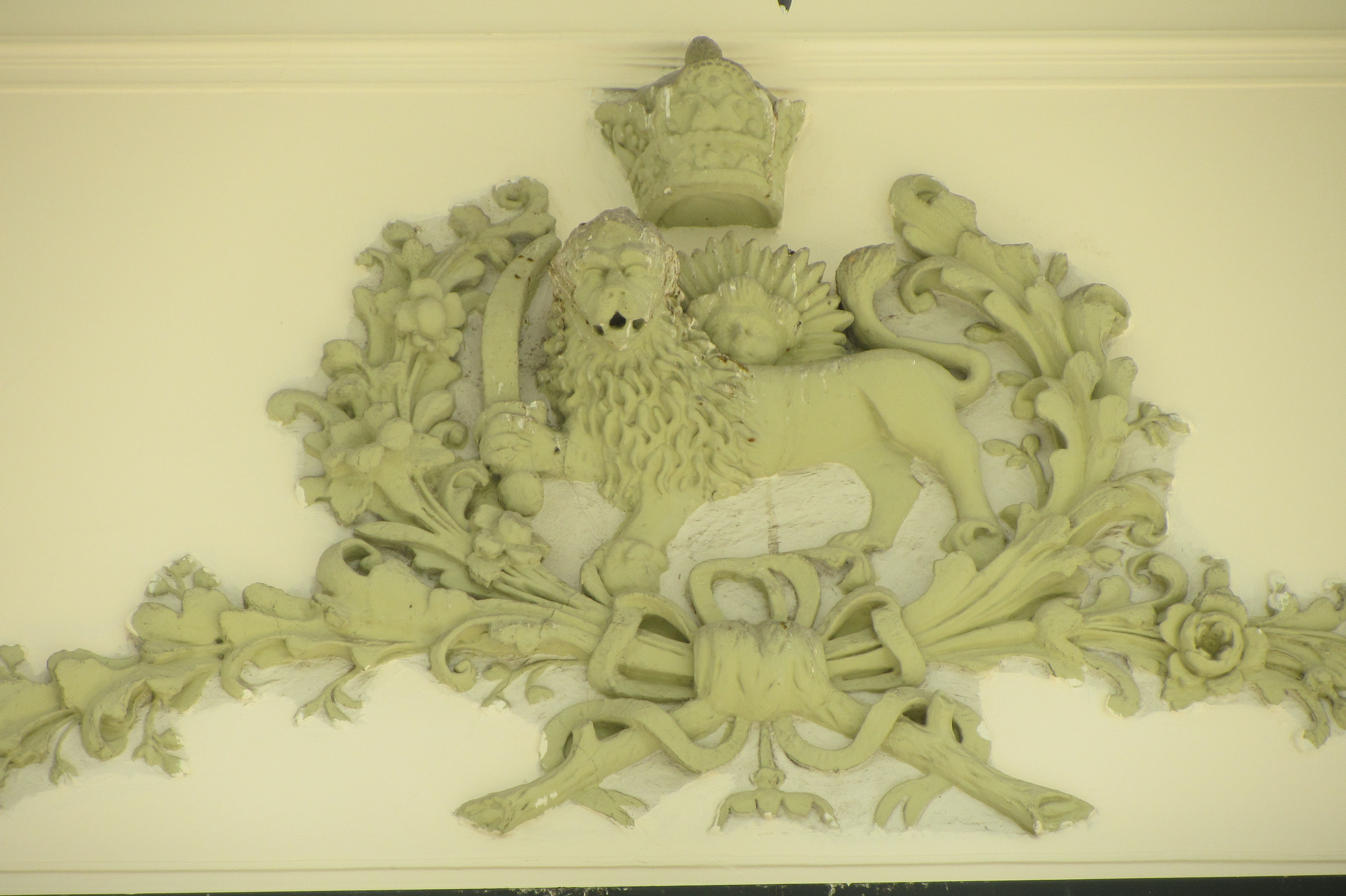
Pavilion entrance

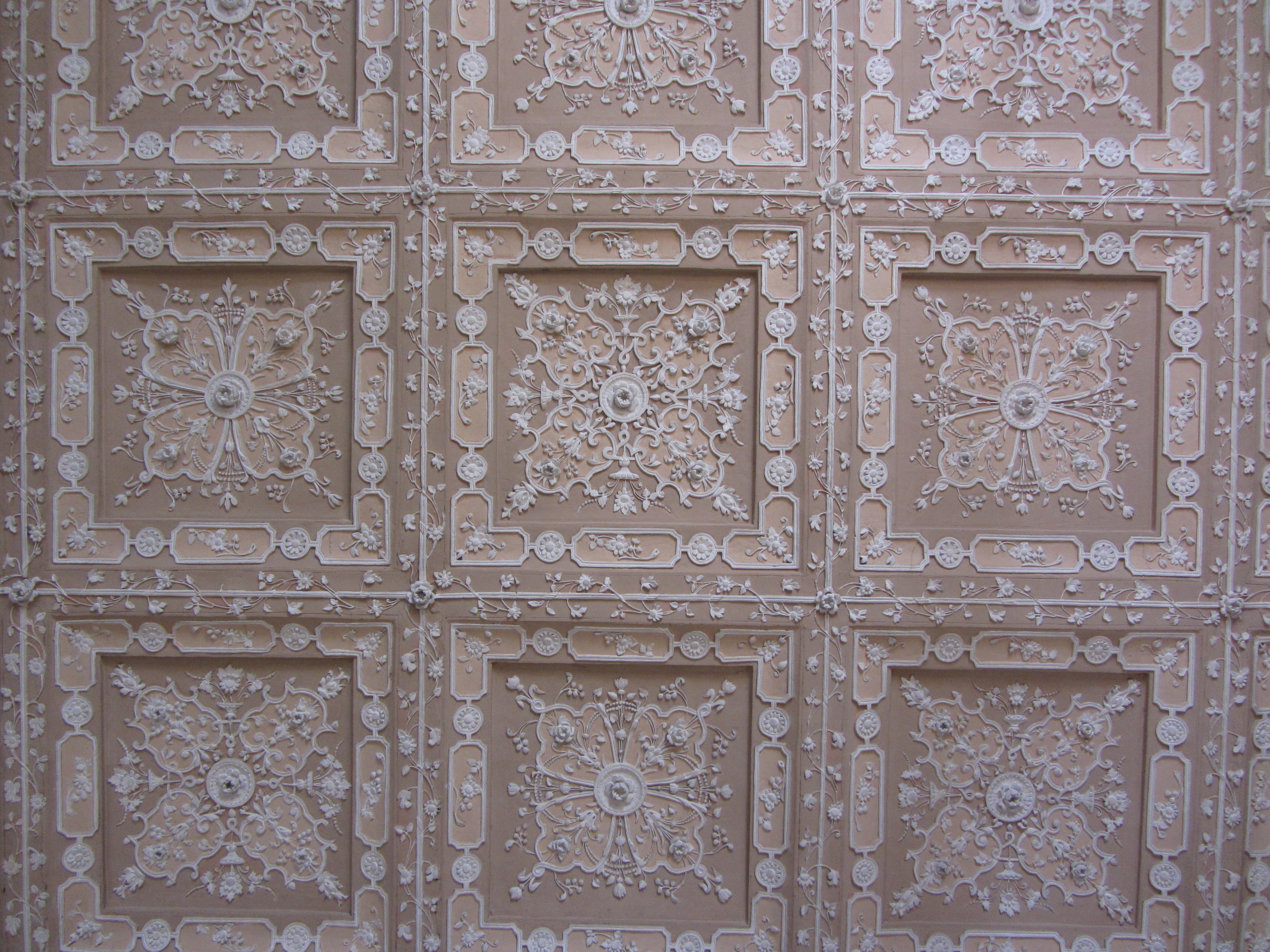
Ceiling plastering

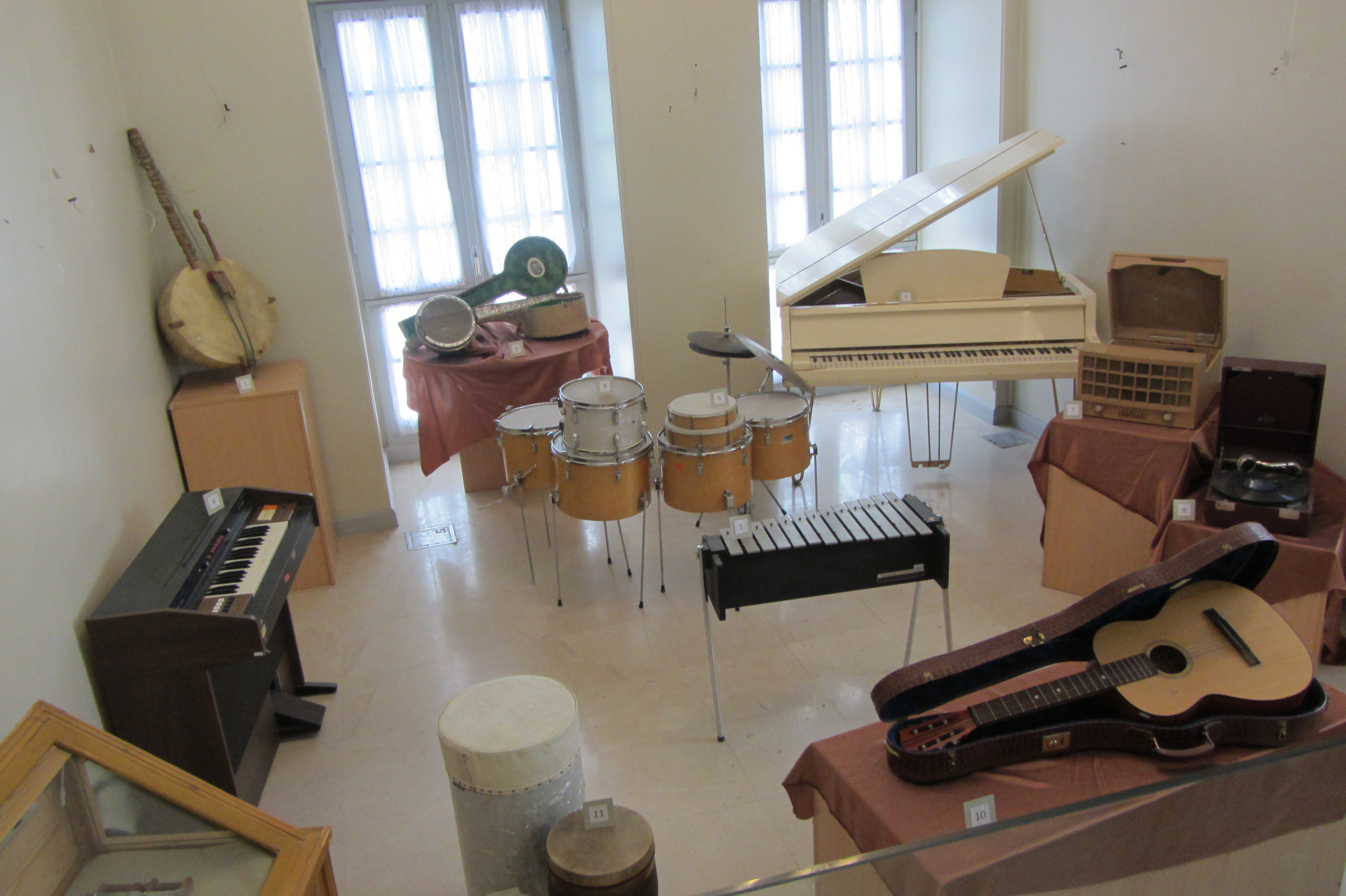
Music room

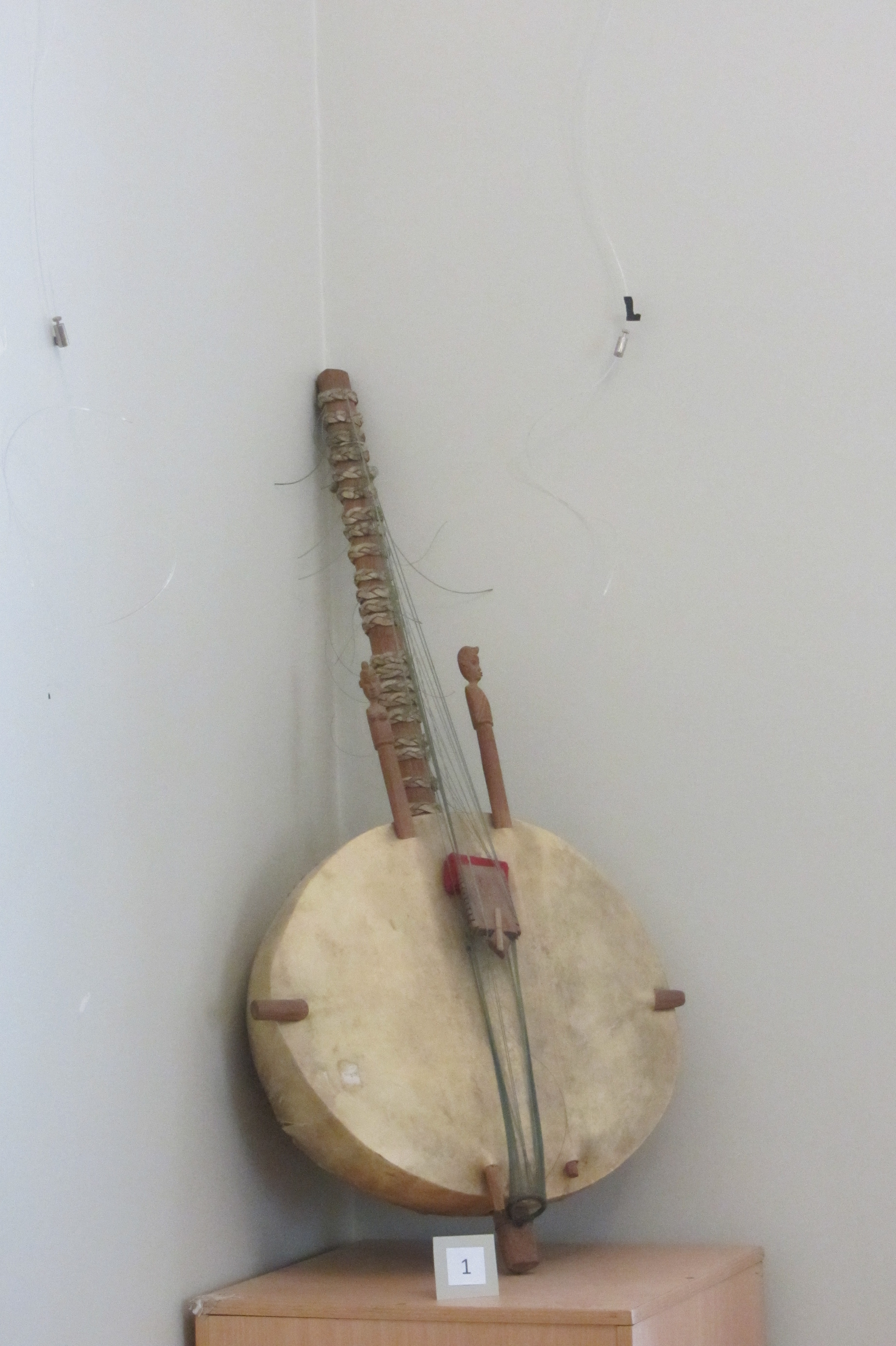
An Ancient music instrument

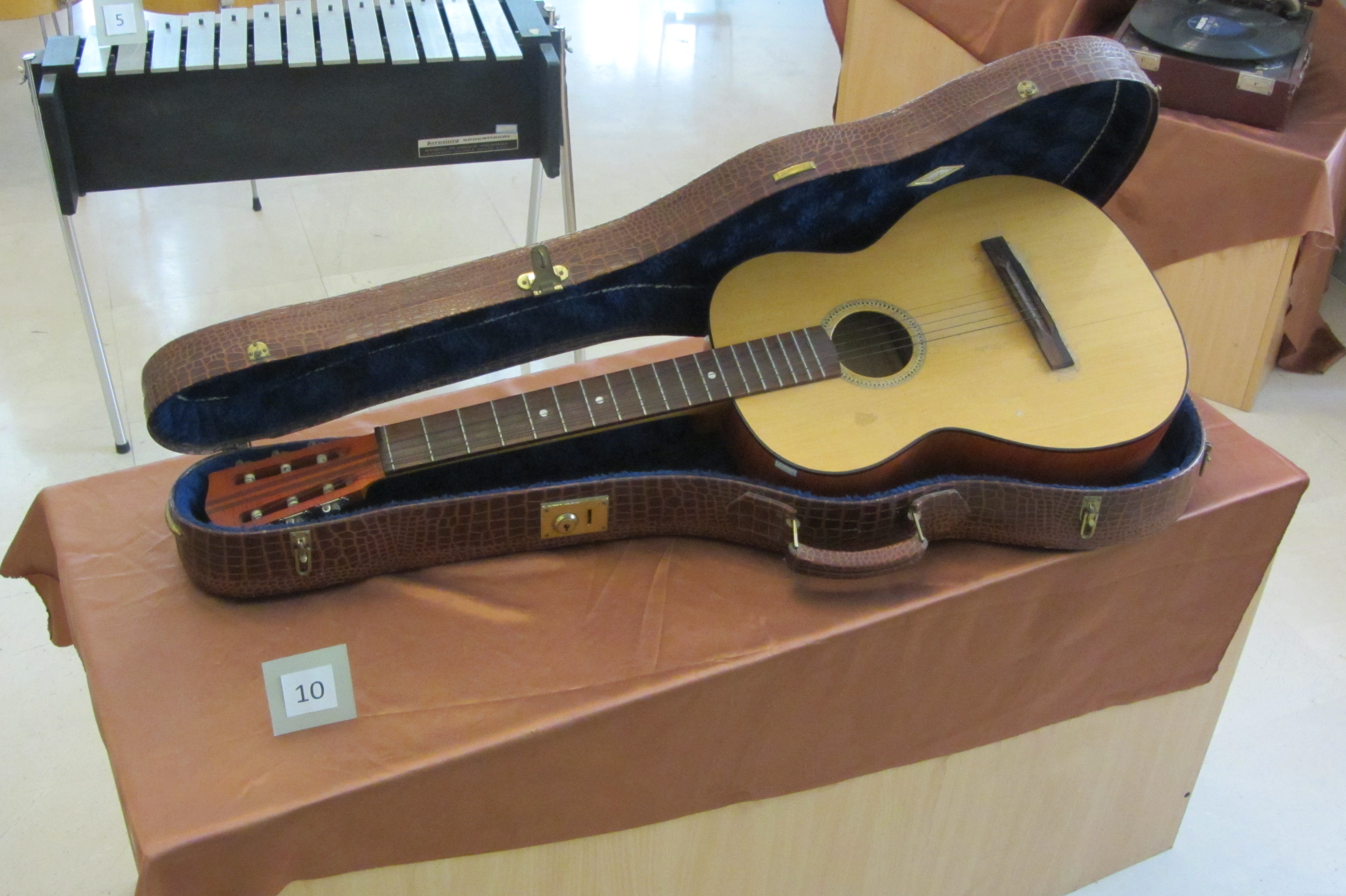
Guitar made in Romania, brand Cuban - 1970

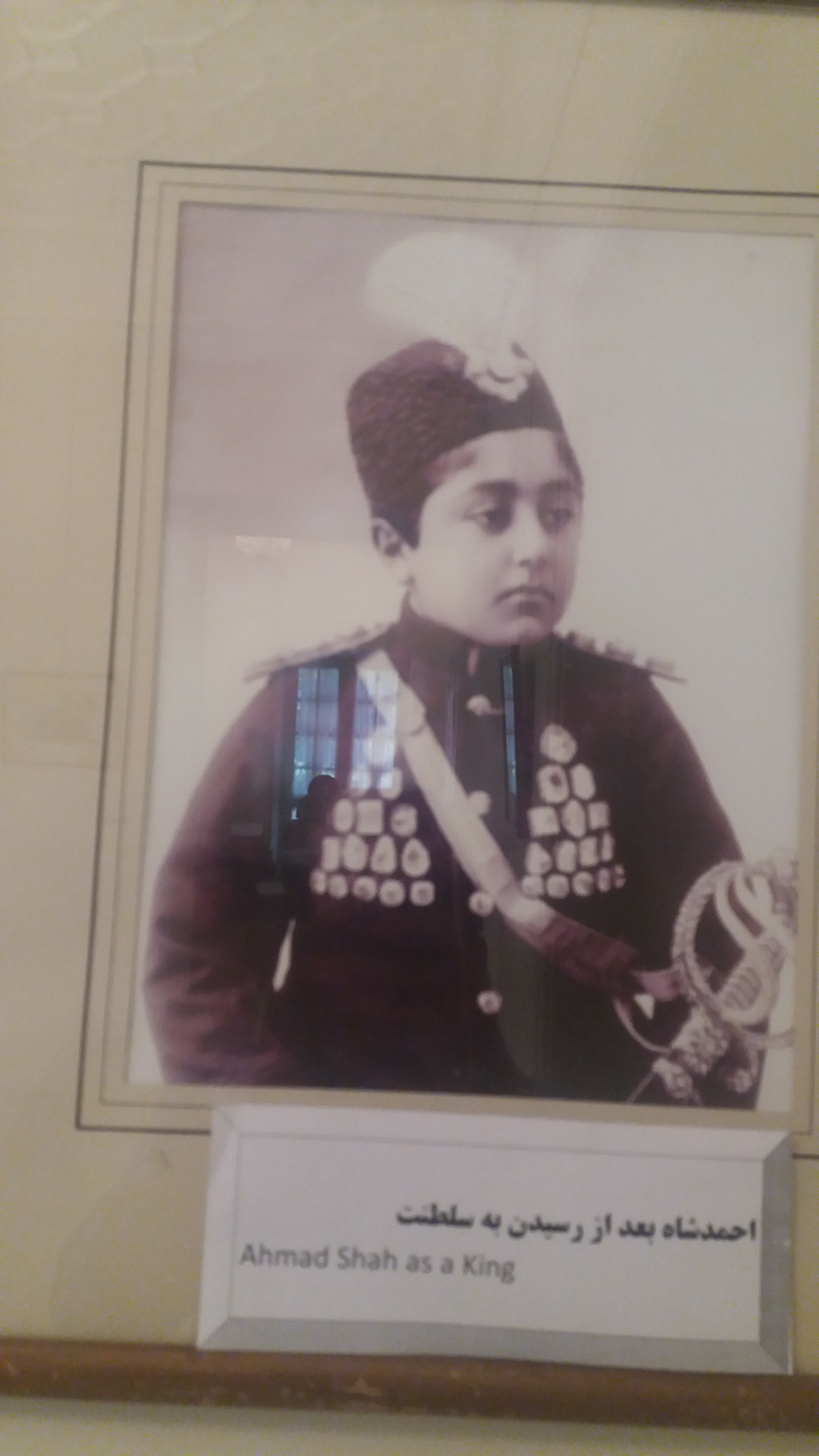
The image of Ahmad Shah Qajar after ascending to the throne

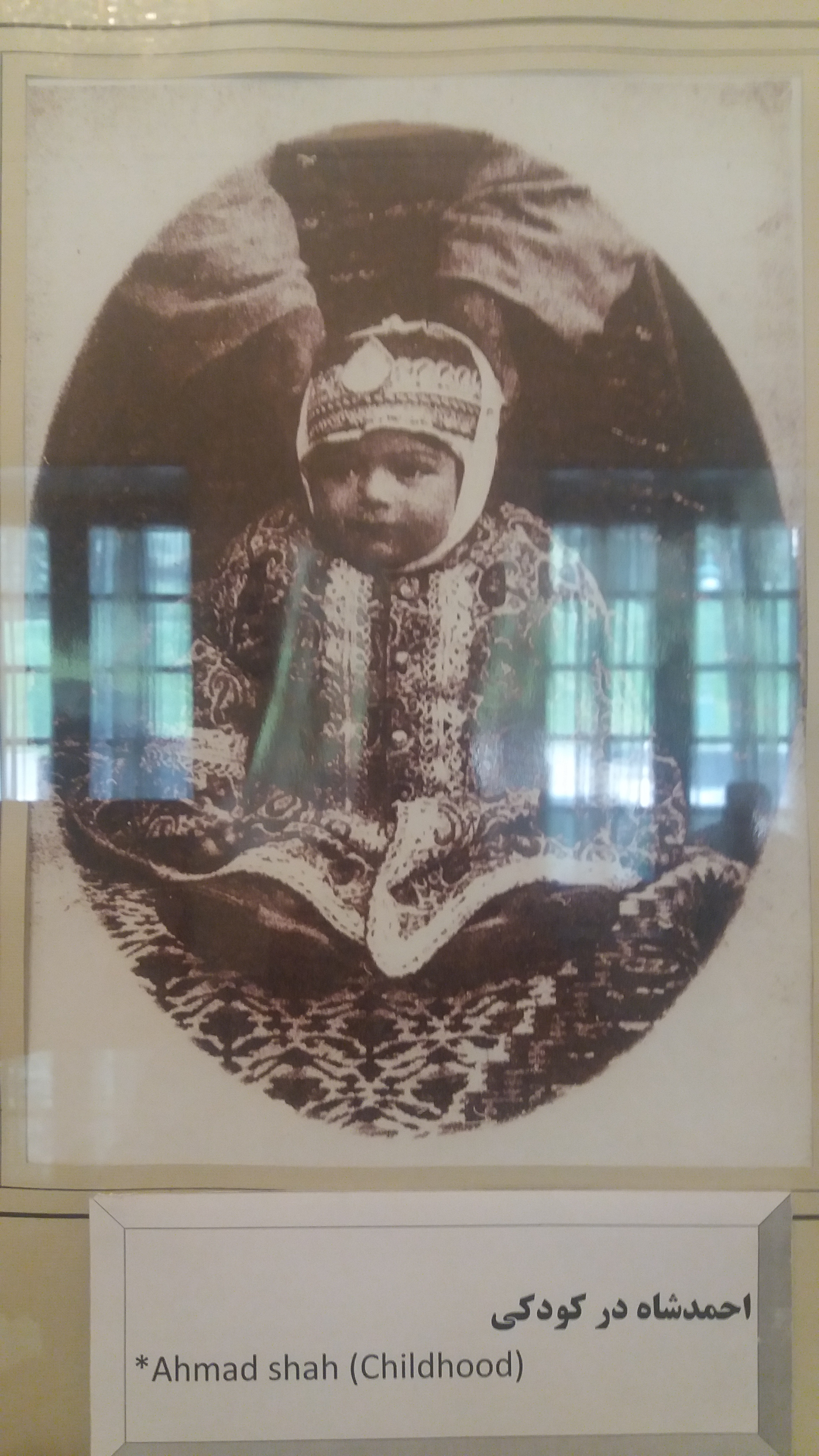
Ahmad Shah Qajar as a child

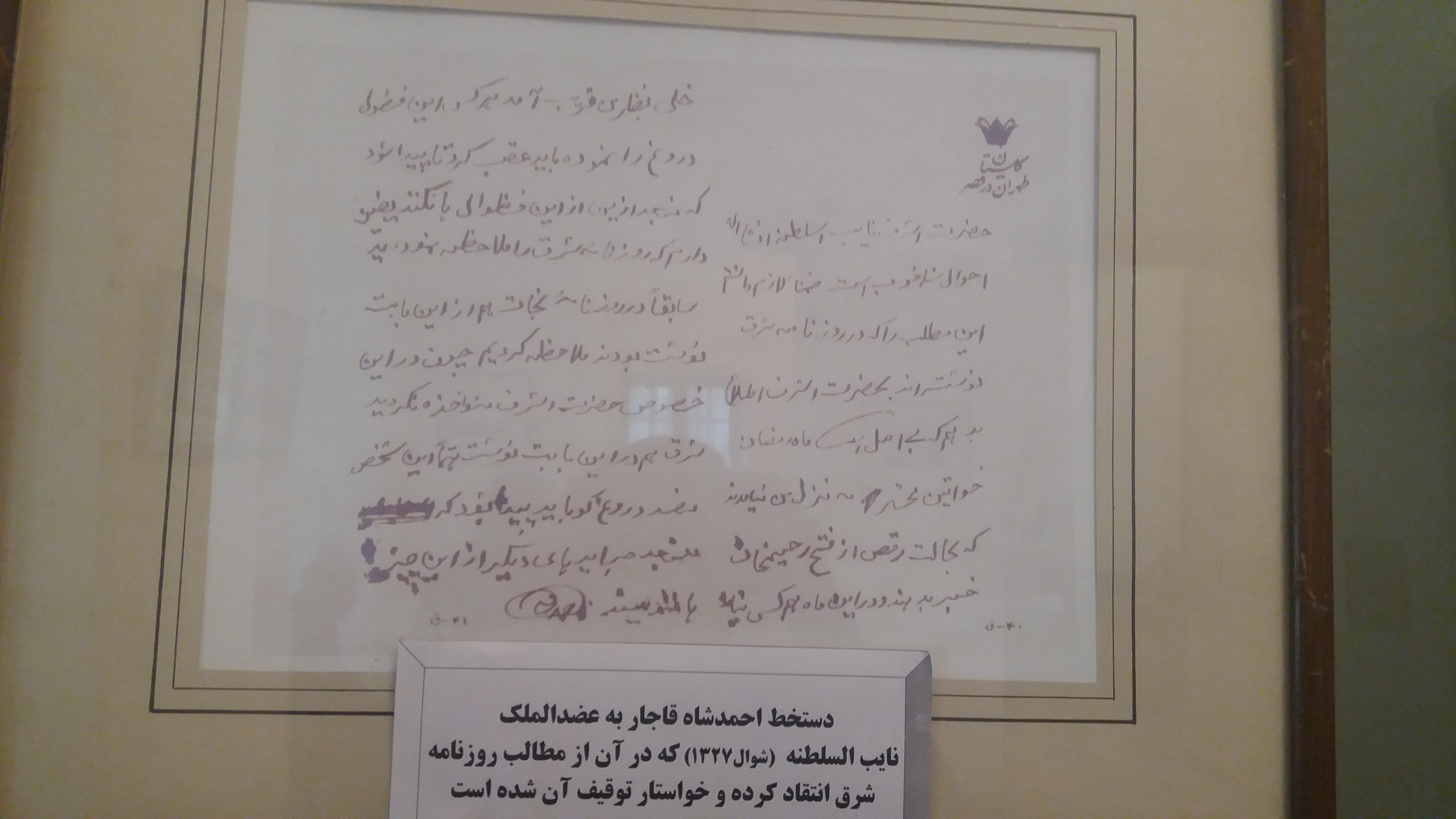
Ahmad Shah Qajar's handwriting

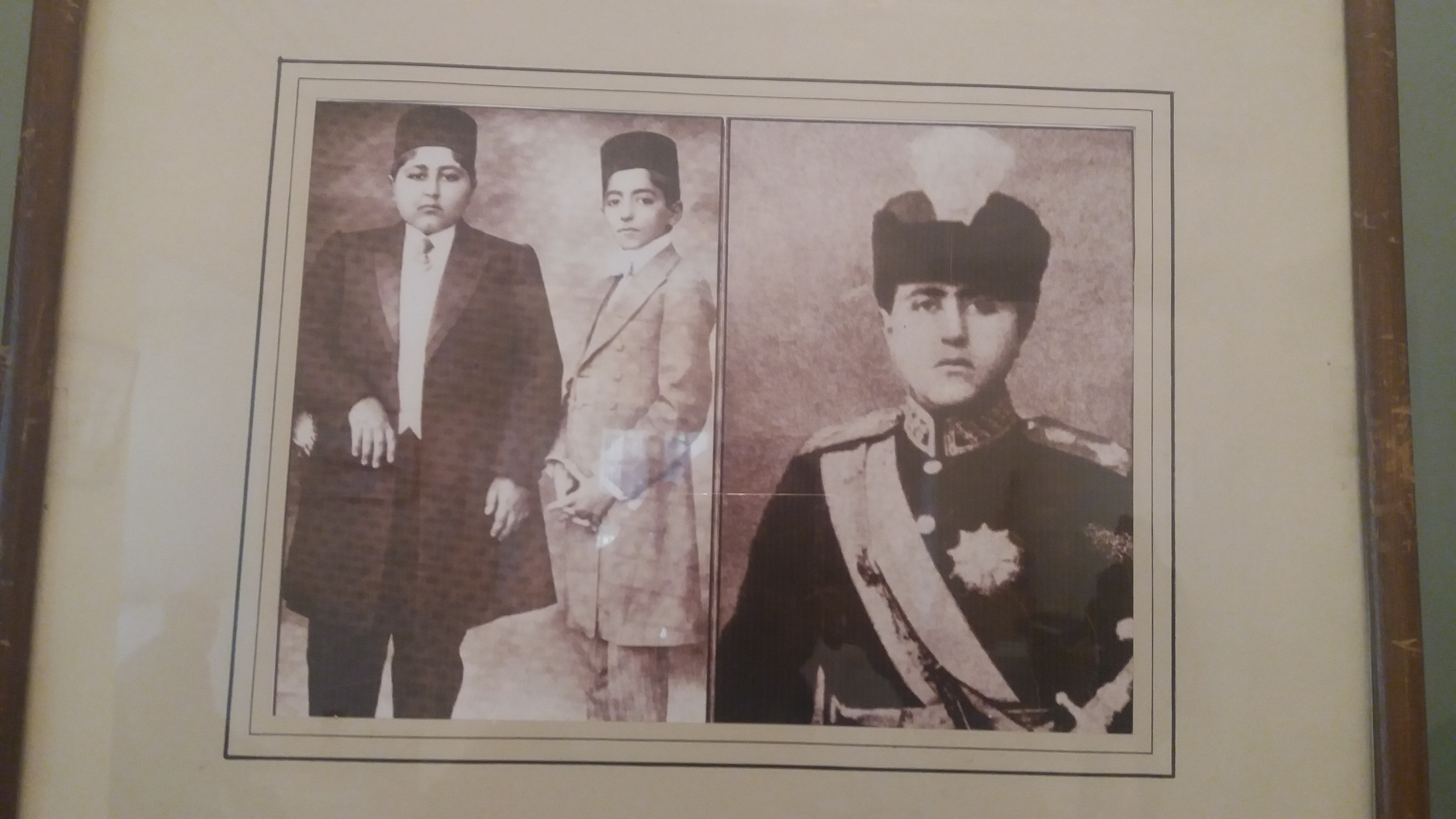
Photographs of Ahmad Shah Qajar

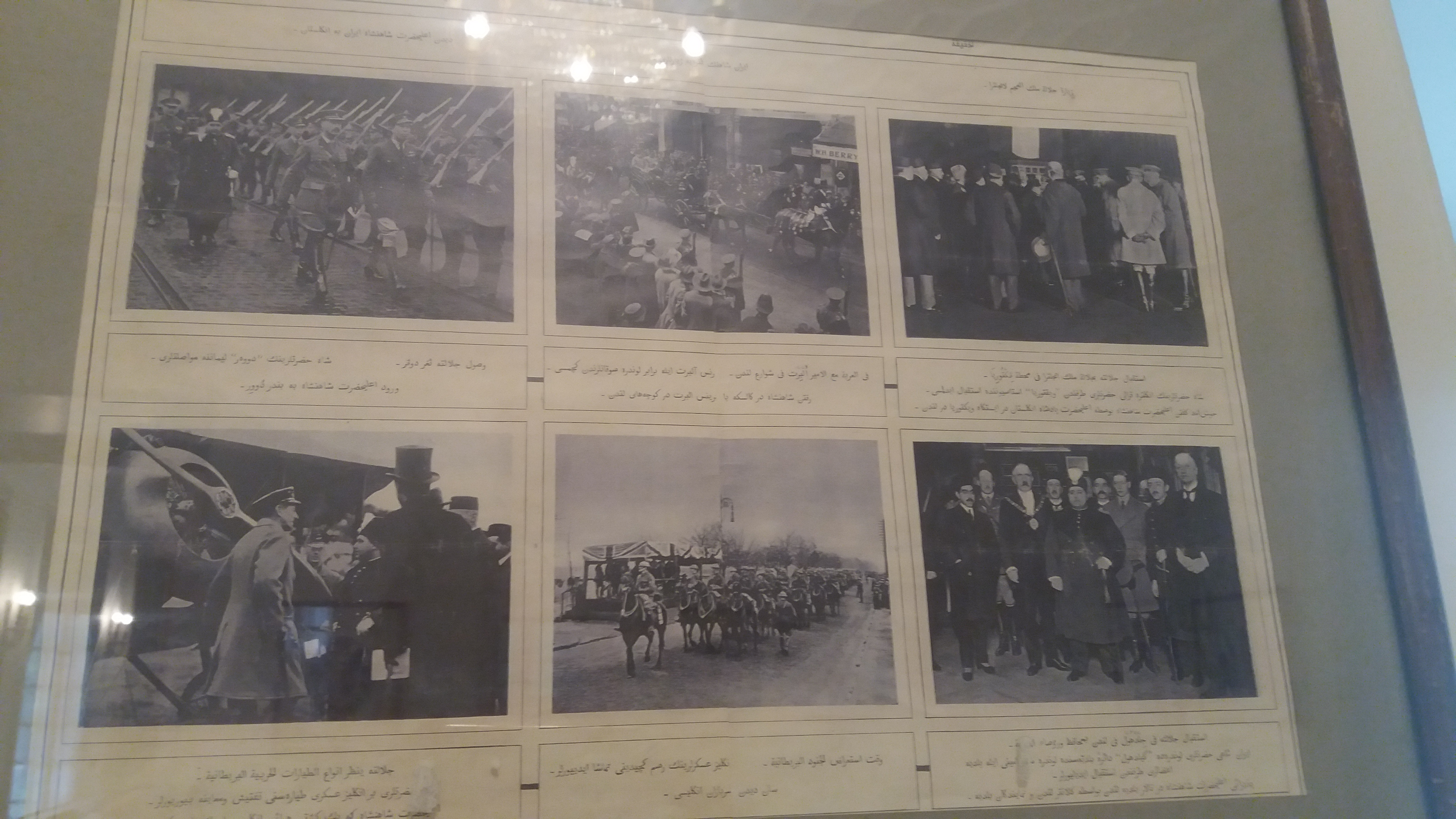
Photos of Ahmad Shah

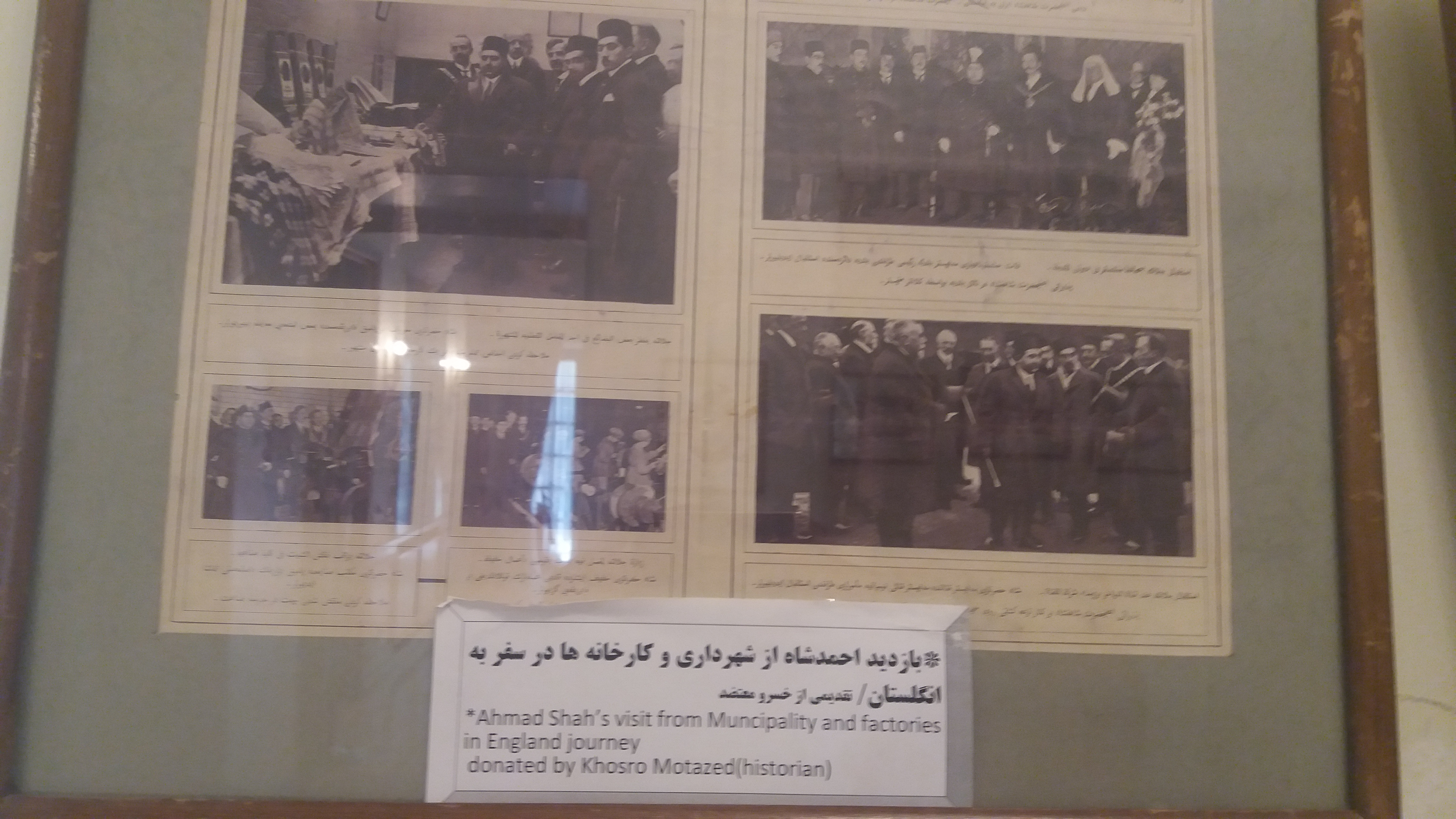
Pictures of Ahmad Shah's visit to England

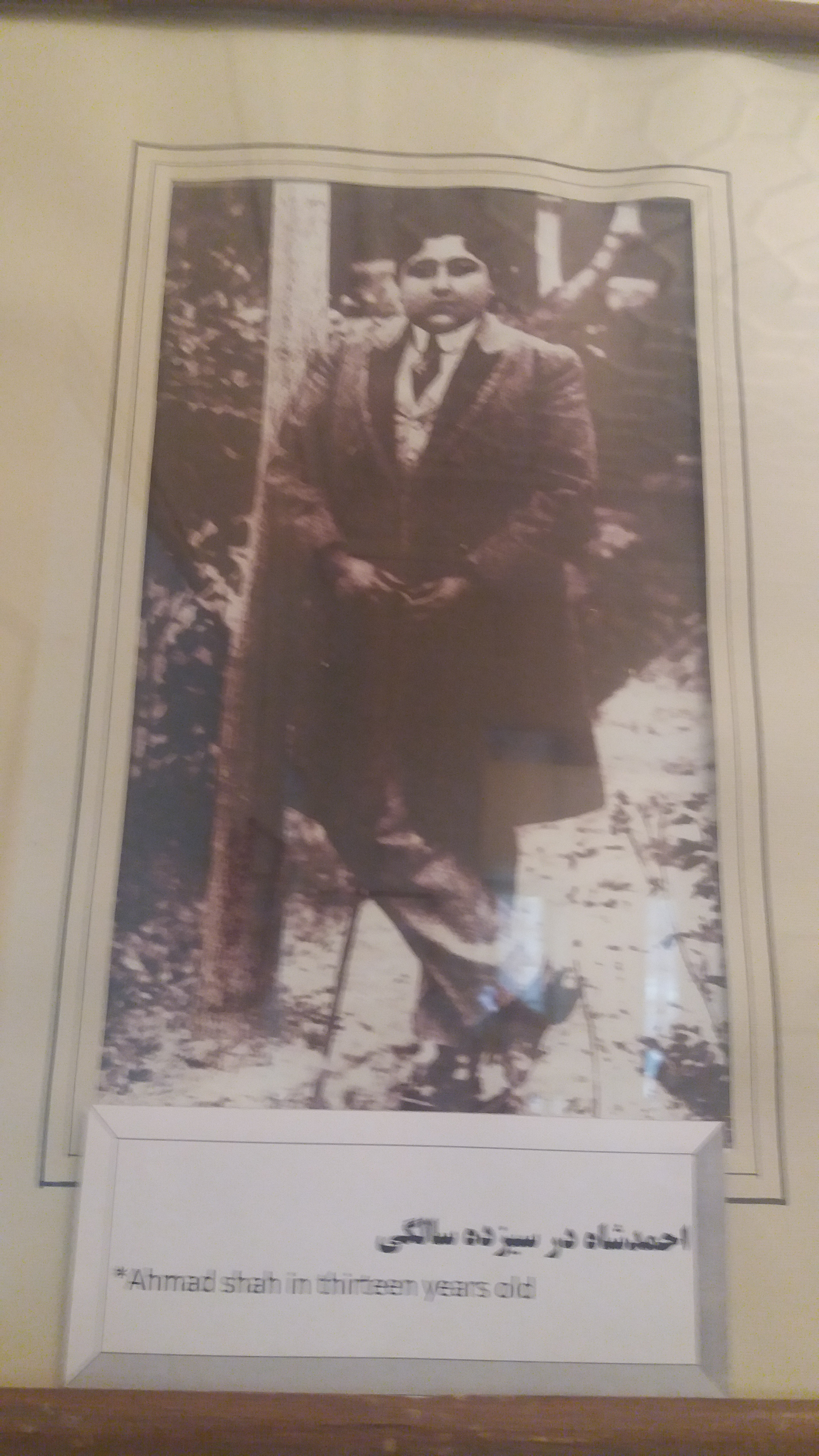
Photo of Ahmad Shah when he was 13.

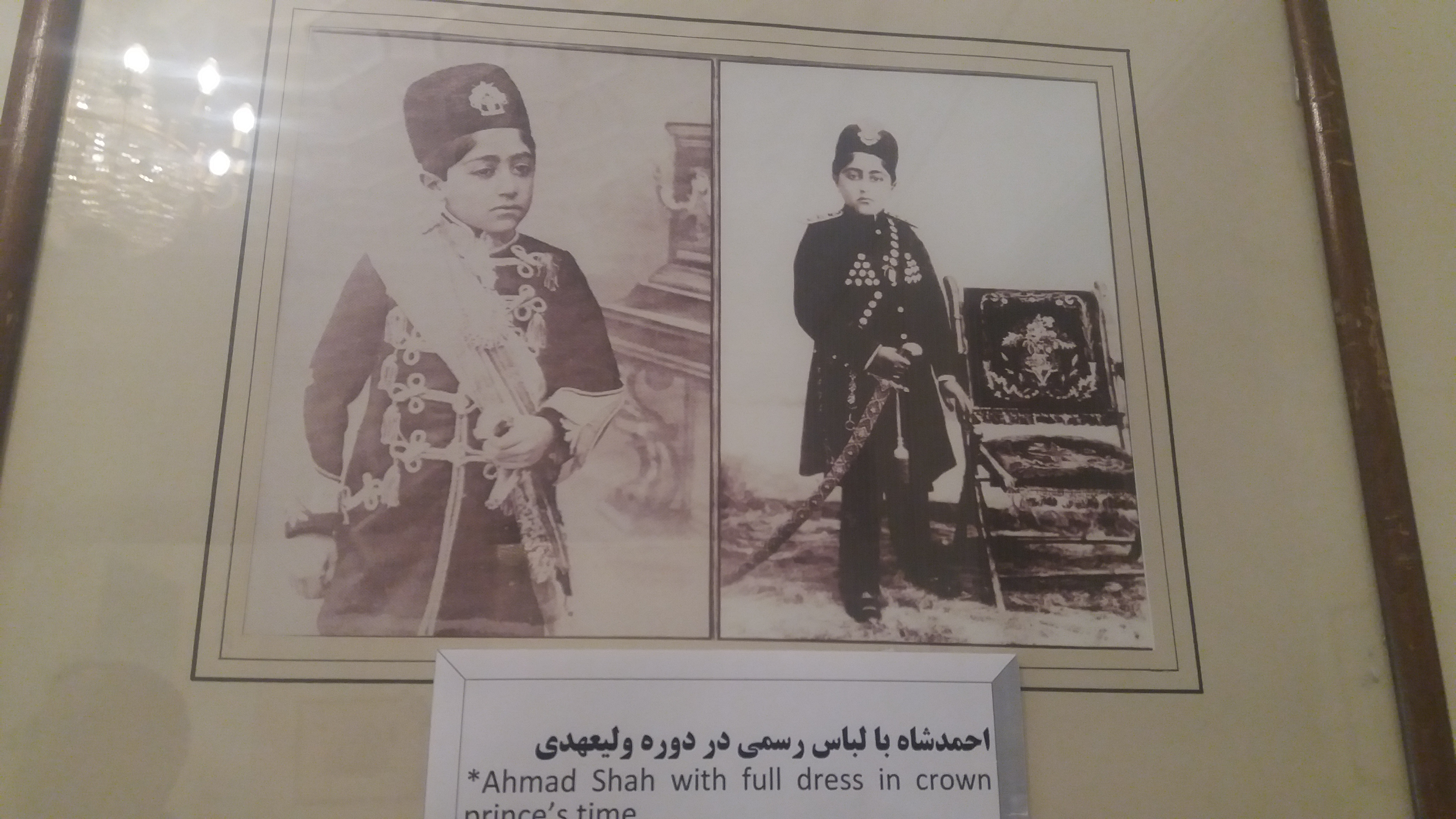
Ahmad Shah Qajar in the official dress of the crown prince

== See also ==
- Sahebgharaniyeh Palace
- Niavaran Palace
- Niavaran Complex
