= List of palaces in Iran =

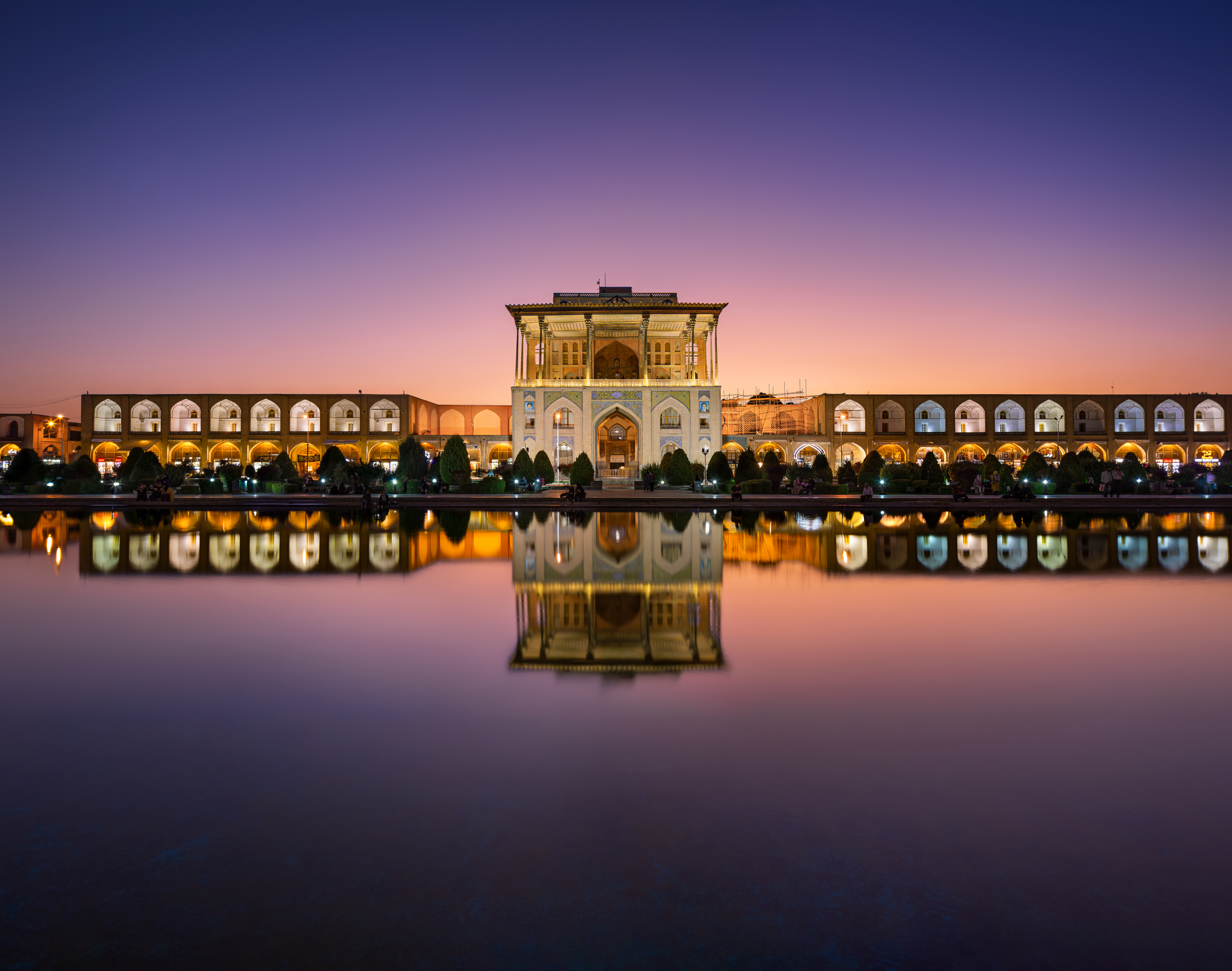
The Safavid Imperial Palace of Ali Qapu on Naqsh-e Jahan Square, Isfahan

This is a list of palaces in Iran.

A palace is a grand residence, especially a royal residence, or the home of a head of state or some other high-ranking dignitary, such as a bishop or archbishop. The word is derived from the Latin name palātium, for Palatine Hill in Rome which housed the Imperial residences. Most European languages have a version of the term (palais, palazzo, palacio, etc.), and many use it for a wider range of buildings than English.

In many parts of Europe, the equivalent term is also applied to large private houses in cities, especially of the aristocracy; often the term for a large country house is different. Many historic palaces are now put to other uses such as parliaments, museums, hotels, or office buildings. The word is also sometimes used to describe a lavishly ornate building used for public entertainment or exhibitions, such as a movie palace.

== List of palaces in Iran ==
Name	Location	Picture	Notes
Ahmad Shahi Pavilion	Tehran		It was built in the 1910s as Ahmad Shah's dwelling in Niavaran Garden.
Ali Qapu	Isfahan		It is a Safavid imperial palace located on the western side of the Naqsh-e Jahan Square, opposite to Sheikh Lotfollah Mosque. Built in the 16th–17th centuries, it was a portal entrance to the imperial estates which stretched from the Naqsh-e Jahan Square to the Chahar Baq Boulevard. UNESCO inscribed the Palace and the Square as a World Heritage Site in 1979. The palace is 48 meters high and has 6 floors.
Ali Qapu	Tabriz		It was initially built in the 16th century, during the Safavid era. In the 19th century, during the Qajar era, a palace named Shams-ol-Emareh was constructed on its site. In the 1940s, following a period of neglect, it was demolished during the Pahlavi era. The East Azerbaijan Governor's Office was built on its site, alongside the Tabriz Municipality building and the Central National Bank's branch complex.
Arg of Karim Khan	Shiraz		Karim Khan Zand , influenced by Safavid architecture and Isfahan's Naqsh-e Jahan Square, built a square in northern Shiraz to the west of which is the Arg citadel. After the conquest of Shiraz by Agha Mohammad Khan Qajar, he demolished Karim Khan's buildings in a hostility to Karim Khan.
Baharestan Palace	Tehran		It was originally built by Mirza Hosein Khan Sepahsalar, a Qajar era prime minister, as his private residence. Thereafter, it was owned by Naser al-Din Shah Qajar. During the Persian Constitutional Revolution, it became the Iranian parliament building. It was bombarded in 1908 by the forces of Mohammad Ali Shah Qajar leading to the Minor Tyranny. It remained the location for the lower house of the parliament (the Senate had moved to a new building) until the 1979 Iranian Revolution. Afterwards, the parliament became unicameral and met at the Senate building, and to a newly built building in Baharestan in 2004.
Baqcheh Jooq Palace	Maku		It is located between the border towns of Maku and Bazargan in West Azerbaijan province. It is situated in a vast garden covering about 11 hectares (27 acres). It was completed at the end of the Qajar era under the orders of Mortezaqoli Eqbal al-Saltaneh Makui, the last Khan of Maku.
Bardak Siah Palace	Temukan		It is an ancient Achaemenid Persian palace situated in the ancient city of Temukan near the township of Borazjan, Bushehr province. The site was unearthed in 1977 by Iranian archeologists headed by Esmaeil Yaghmaei.
Behistun Palace	Bisotun		It is a ruined Sasanian palace facing a cliff with the much older Behistun Inscription and rock relief. Traditionally, it has been regarded as a residence of Shirin, queen of Khosrow II (r. 590–628). This is first documented, in surviving records, by early Islamic geographers, and is elaborated in later stories and myths, as a fictionalized Shirin became a heroine of later Persian literature, such as the Shahnameh. It is included in the UNESCO World Heritage Site of Bisotun.
Chehel Sotoun	Isfahan		The name, meaning "Forty Columns" in Persian, was inspired by its twenty columns which, when reflected in the waters of the fountain, are said to appear to be forty. As with Ali Qapu, the palace contains many frescoes and paintings on ceramic. Many of the ceramic panels have been dispersed and are now in major museums in the west. They depict specific historical scenes such as the infamous Battle of Chaldiran against the Ottoman Sultan Selim I, the reception of an Uzbek King in 1646, when the palace had just been completed; the welcome extended to the Mughal Emperor, Humayun who took refuge in Iran in 1544; the battle of Taher-Abad in 1510 where the Safavid Shah Ismail I vanquished and killed the Uzbek king. A more recent painting depicts Nader Shah's victory against the Indian Army at Karnal in 1739. There are also less historical, but even more aesthetic compositions in the traditional miniature style celebrating the joy of life and love.
Chehel Sotun	Qazvin		Its construction is attributed to Tahmasp I, who transferred Iran's capital from Tabriz to Qazvin in 1555–56. In the Qajar era, it was repaired and remodeled by Mohammad Bagher Sa'd as-Saltaneh, the governor of Qazvin.
East Azerbaijan Governance Palace	Tabriz		In 1946, Governor Ali Mansur demolished the remaining parts of the Shams-ol-Emareh Palace, which had been destroyed in a fire and a flood, and a new marble building was constructed instead, which has served as the office of the provincial governor till now. In 2013, a museum titled East Azerbaijan Governorship was established in the building.
Ferdows Garden	Tehran		Also known as Rašk-e Behešt (Envy of Heaven), its origins date back to Mohammad Shah (r. 1834–1848) of the Qajar dynasty, who ordered the construction of a mansion named Mohammadieh in Tajrish. Over the years, it was leased to various ministries. After the 1979 Iranian Revolution, until 2002, it served as a training center for filmmaking. Since 2002, it houses the Cinema Museum.
Golestan Palace	Tehran		Tehran's arg ("citadel") was built during the reign of Tahmasp I (r. 1524–1576) of the Safavid dynasty, and was later renovated by Karim Khan (r. 1751–1779) of the Zand dynasty. Agha Mohammad Khan (r. 1789–1797) of the Qajar dynasty chose Tehran as his capital. The arg became the seat of the Qajars (1794–1925). The palace was rebuilt to its current form in 1865 by Haji Ab ol Hasan Mimar Navai.
Hasht Behesht	Isfahan		As indicated on its name (eight heavens), the two-story pavilion of Hasht Behesht was built on the hasht-behesht plan, that is a type of floor plan consisting of a central hall surrounded by eight rooms. The building is of an octagonal shape, and has two main entrances. Four larger sides of it feature large balconies (iwans), under which some tall and thin wooden columns are raised. The pavilion is decorated with mural paintings, perforated woodwork, ayeneh-kari, tilework, and plasterwork.
Hasht Behesht	Tabriz		Its construction was started by the Aq Qoyunlu ruler Uzun Hasan and completed by his son Yaqub Beg in 1483–1486. The Palace was destroyed by the Ottoman Jafar Pasha in 1585, and replaced by the Castle of Jafar Pasha. Nevertheless, it was influential in the creation of other buildings, such as the Hasht Behesht in Isfahan, and contributed to the "Hasht Bihisht" model of architecture.
Jahan Nama Palace	Farahabad		It is located in Farahabad, Mazandaran province and is part of the Farahabad Complex. The Palace was built during the reign of Abbas the Great and was destroyed by the Cossacks.
Khosrow Palace	Qasr-e Shirin		It was built on the order of Khosrow II for his Christian wife, Shirin.
Marble Palace	Tehran		It was built by Reza Shah in 1933. The palace is covered by a huge dome that is a replica of the Sheikh Lotfollah mosque in Isfahan.
Masoudieh Mansion	Tehran		It was built as a residence for the Qajar prince Mass'oud Mirza Zell-e Soltan in 1878. During the Persian Constitutional Revolution, it became a revolutionary foothold. In 1908, a bomb exploded under Mohammad Ali Shah's carriage nearby, causing him to initiate the 1908 bombardment of the parliament. The first national library and the first National Museum of Iran were established here.
Naseri Palace	Sharestanak		Also known as Shahrestanak Palace, it was commissioned by Naser al-Din Shah and built in 1878–1881 as a retreat along the mountain route from Tehran to Mazandaran. Following a long period of abandonment, it was largely revitalised in 2021–2026 to serve as a boutique hotel, restaurant, art gallery, and cultural tourism hub.
Negarestan Palace	Tehran		It was built as a summer residence by the order of Fath-Ali Shah Qajar in 1807.
Niavaran Complex	Tehran		It is a complex in northern Tehran from the Qajar and Pahlavi eras. It includes the Sahebgharaniyeh Palace, the Ahmad Shahi Pavilion, and the Niavaran Palace.
Niavaran Palace	Tehran		It is a royal palace, museum, and former residence of the Pahlavi dynasty. The palace was completed in 1967 for Shah Mohammad Reza Pahlavi and his family.
Palace of Ardashir	Firuzabad		The structure contains three domes, among other features, making it slightly larger and more magnificent than its predecessor, the nearby castle of Dezh Dokhtar. However, it seems that the compound was designed to display the royal image of Ardashir I, rather than being a fortified structure for defensive purposes. Therefore, perhaps it would be best to refer to the structure as a "palace" rather than a "castle", even though it has huge walls on the perimeters (twice as thick as Ghal'eh Dokhtar), and is a contained structure. From the architectural design, it seems the palace was more of a place of social gathering where guests would be introduced to the imperial throne.
Palace of Darius in Susa	Susa		Its construction was begun by the Achaemenid king Darius the Great in his favorite capital, Susa. It was captured and plundered by the invading Macedonians under Alexander the Great in December 330 BC.
Pearl Palace	Karaj		Built in the early 1970s, it was designed by Taliesin Associated Architects (Frank Lloyd Wright Foundation) on instructions from Princess Shams Pahlavi, elder sister of Mohammad Reza Pahlavi, the last Shah of Iran.
Qajar Palace	Tehran		It was built in the early reign of Fath-Ali Shah Qajar just outside Tehran. In the 1920s, it was demolished by Reza Shah to be replaced by the Qasr prison. The only remnant of the complex is a small pavilion.
Qasr-e Abunasr	Shiraz		Also known as Takht-e Sulayman, it is an ancient settlement in Shiraz. According to archaeological studies the fortress was built during the Parthian era, and was an important and strategic location in the Sasanian Empire. Archaeologists have found various artifacts and coins belonging to various historical periods, such as the Achaemenid, Seleucid, Parthian, and Sasanian. When the Muslims conquered Iran, they called this palace "Father of Victory" (Qaṣr-i-Abu Naṣr)
Ramsar Palace	Ramsar		It was established on a land of 60,000 square meters in 1937. The area was a historical garden in Ramsar. The palace was used as a summer residence by Reza Shah and then by his son, Mohammad Reza Pahlavi. Mohammad Reza Pahlavi and his second spouse Sorayya Esfendiari spent their honeymoon in the palace.
Ruby Palace	Tehran		Located in eastern Tehran, it was built in 1883 as a residence for Naser al-Din Shah Qajar.
Sa'dabad Complex	Tehran		The complex was initially built and inhabited by the Qajar dynasty in the 19th century. After extensive expansions, Reza Shah of the Pahlavi dynasty resided there in the 1920s. His son, Shah Mohammad Reza Pahlavi, moved there in the 1970s. After the 1979 Revolution, the complex became a public museum.
Sabet Pasal Palace	Tehran		It is Tehran's largest historic house. It belonged to Habibollah Sabet (also known as Sabet Pasal), a rich Iranian businessman and the founder of Iran's first television station.
Safi Abad Palace	Behshahr		Built during the reign of Shah Abbas the Great (r. 1587–1629), the palace was expanded later on and, after suffering extensive damage due to a fire in the early 20th century, was repaired during the Pahlavi era (1925–1979).
Sahebgharaniyeh Palace	Tehran		It was built in 1850 by the order of Naser ed-Din Shah Qajar. On 28 May 1901, Mozaffar ad-Din Shah Qajar signed the D'Arcy Concession here. Later, on 5 August 1906, he also issued the firman proclaiming the constitutional monarchy in this palace.
Sarvestan Palace	Sarvestan		It is a Sasanian era building built in the 7th century AD, and was either a gubernatorial residence or a Zoroastrian fire temple. It is designated as one of the eight UNESCO World Heritage Sites in the Sassanid Archaeological Landscape of Fars Region.
Shams-ol-Emareh	Tehran		Before his visit to Europe, Naser al-Din Shah Qajar wanted to build a mansion in his capital to compete with Isfahan's Ālī Qāpū. A tall building from which he could see the entirety of Tehran. By his order, the construction of Shams-ol-Emareh began in 1865 and was finished in 2 years. Naser al-Din Shah took his guests to the roof of this building to see the capital. Building's designer was Moayer al Mamalek and the architecture was Ali Mohammed Kashi. The style of this building is a combination of traditional Iranian and European architecture.
Soleymaniyeh Palace	Karaj		It is a Qajar era royal residence notable for its paintings depicting Agha Mohammad Khan Qajar and his brothers and Fath-Ali Shah Qajar and his sons.
Sun Palace	Kalat		Built in 1738–1739, it is one of the few buildings built during the reign of Nader Shah. Its construction stopped after his assassination. It is currently used as a museum of anthropology.
Tachara	Persepolis		The Tachara was the exclusive residence of Darius the Great at Persepolis.
Valerian Palace	Bishapur		It is a Sasanian palace built for the Roman Emperor Valerian who had been taken prisoner after the victory of Shapur I in the Battle of Edessa. It was registered in 1310 SH (Note: 1931–1932 in the Gregorian calendar) as one of the first national monuments of Iran. It is also listed as part of the Bishapur complex in the UNESCO World Heritage List.

== See also ==
- List of palaces
- Official residence
- List of castles in Iran
