= Esmaeil Yaghmaei =

Iranian archaeologist (1941–2026)

Esmaeil (Ehsan) Yaghmaei (Persian: اسماعیل یغمایی; 18 September 1941 – 19 July 2026) was an Iranian archaeologist and writer. He led numerous archaeological excavations across various regions of Iran.

== Background ==
Born to a cultural family, Esmaeil Yaghmaei was born on 18 September 1941, in Tehran. His family origins trace back to Khur, a small village in Khur and Biabanak County, Isfahan Province. He completed his elementary and high school education at 15th of Bahman School, earning his diploma in 1958. He later pursued higher education at the Faculty of Archaeology and Art History at the University of Tehran, where he obtained a master's degree in archaeology in 1975.

His father, Habib Yaghmai, was a prominent Iranian journalist.

== Archaeological career ==
Yaghmaei joined the Department of Archaeology and Folk Culture at the Ministry of Culture and Arts in May 1967 as a research assistant. His involvement in archaeology expanded over the years, leading him to participate in and supervise numerous excavations. His first fieldwork experience was in Haft Tappeh, Khuzestan, between winter 1967 and spring 1968. Before the 1979 Iranian Revolution, he contributed to excavations at sites such as Chogha Gavaneh in Eslamabad-e Gharb, Shahr-e Sukhteh, Jafarabad Mound in Susa, Sheikh Tappeh in Urmia, the Achaemenid palace of Charkhab in Borazjan, and the Sassanid palace complex in Bishapur.

He continued his work in archaeology, supervising excavations at sites including Kalako Mound in Gorgan (1971), the Mounds of Jews and Manba Ab in Kangavar (1972), and the Achaemenid palaces of Sang-e Siah and Bardak-e Siah in Dashtestan (1977). Notably, he led the first post-revolution archaeological survey in Chogha Gavaneh in the autumn of 1979 and spring of 1980.

From winter 1982 onward, Yaghmaei led independent excavations at sites such as Arjan in Behbahan, Shoghab Cemetery in Bushehr, Qalaychi Mound in Bukan, Shahzavar Cemetery in Firouzkouh, Semnan Fortress, Tang-e Takab in Behbahan, Kelak Cemetery in Karaj, and various other historical locations across Iran. His final major excavation took place in spring 2005 at the Achaemenid palace of Bardak Siah.

== Death ==
Yaghmaei died on 19 July 2026, at the age of 84.

== Publications ==
Yaghmaei authored several books and articles on Iranian archaeology, including:

- Archaeological Surveys in the Iveh Region (co-authored with Professor Henry Wright)
- Imamzadehs of Tehran, Rey, and Shemiran
- Shush, The Fifteenth City
- The Bardak-e Siah Palace
- Ornamental Motifs in Ancient Iran
- The Worship of Mithra in Iran
- The Castle of Colonialism
- Safe Zones
- That Palace of Jamshid

Additionally, he wrote memoirs reflecting on his experiences in archaeology and Iranian history, including A Thousand-Year-Old Tresses: Memoirs of an Archaeologist (2017) and When I Was a Child... (2023). The latter recounts his childhood memories, intertwined with historical events of 1950s Iran, such as the imprisonment of Mohammad Mosaddegh, the bread riots under Hakim al-Mulk, and the cultural scene of Tehran during that period.
