= Bardak Siah Palace =

Archaeological site in Iran

Coordinates: 29°21′15″N 51°06′35″E

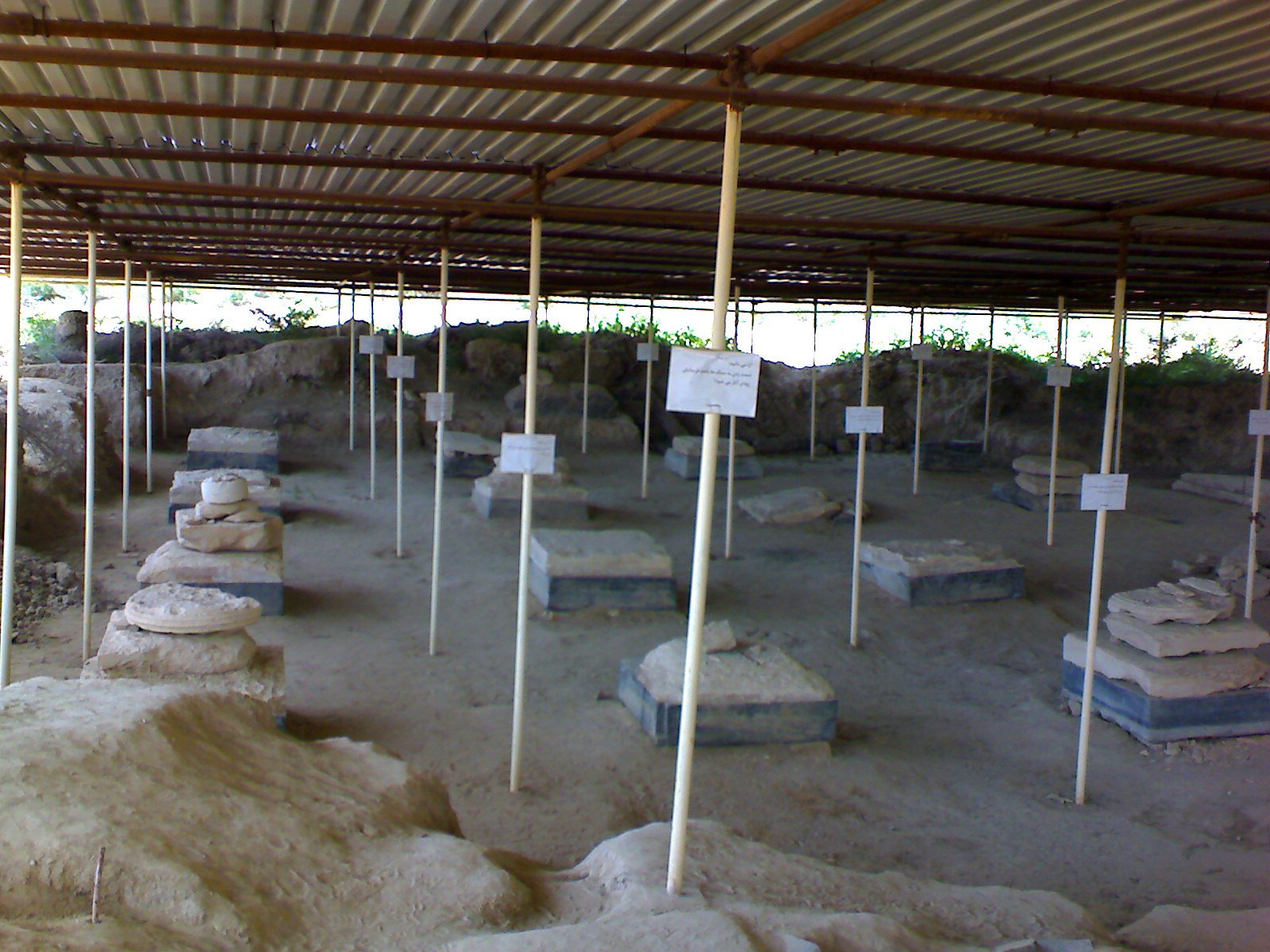
Bardak Siah Palace Archaeological Site

Bardak Siah Palace (Persian: کاخ بردک‌سیاه) is the name of the site of an ancient Achaemenid Persian palace situated in the ancient city of Temukan near the township of Borazjan in the northern part of Bushehr province of Iran. The site was unearthed in 1977 by Iranian archeologists headed by Esmaeil (Ehsan) Yaghmaei

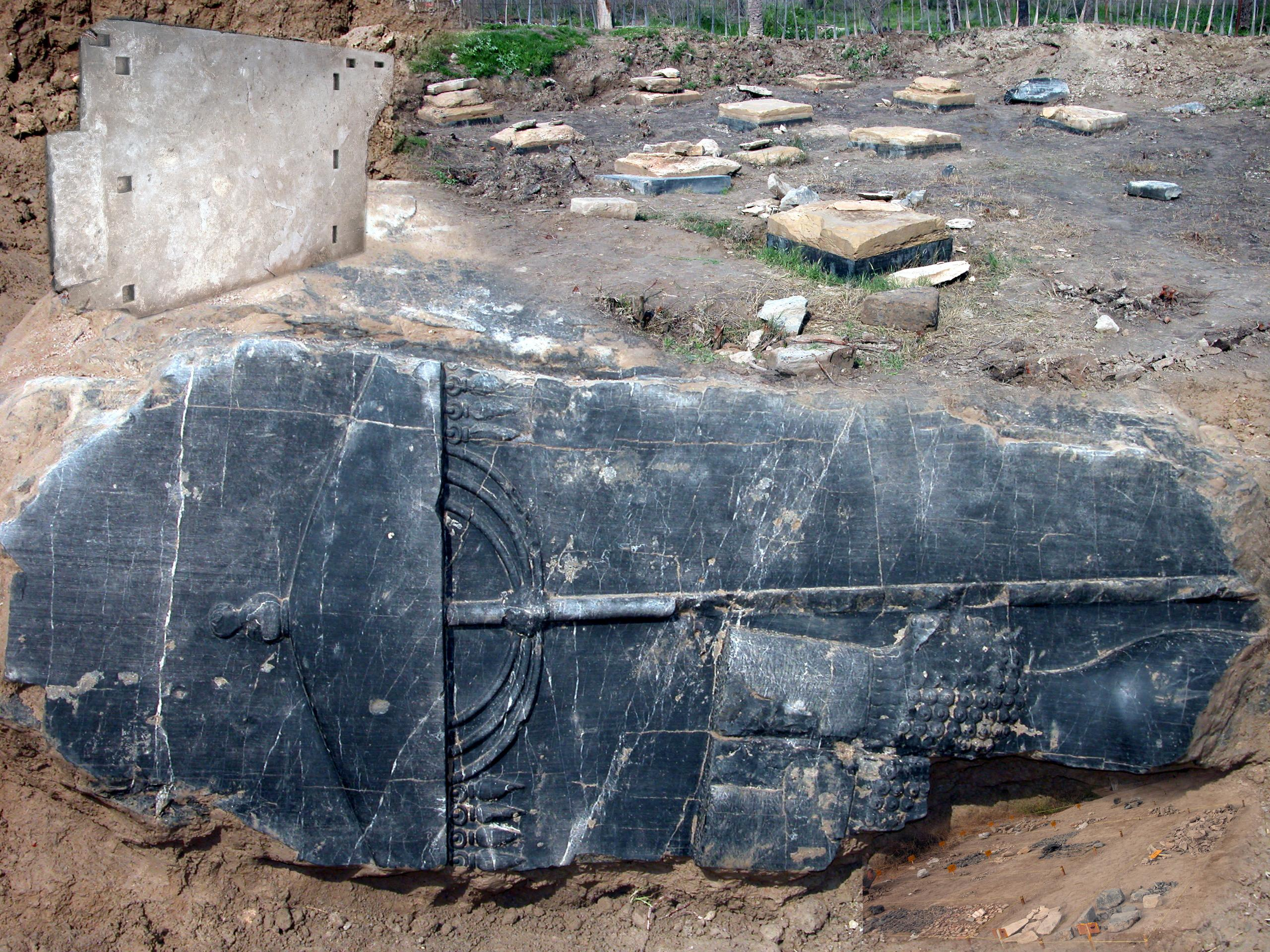

Further excavations at the site in 2005 led to a fragmentary sculpture featuring the head of the Achaemenid emperor Darius the Great (r. 521 BC-485 BC) with a servant carrying an umbrella behind him as well as four pieces of gold in the form of thick folded sheets with a combined weight of about three kilograms buried beside one of the main hall's columns. Yaghmaii said he believed the gold sheets may have inscriptions on them and may have been deliberately folded and hidden during antiquity. An inscription was also recovered with handwriting in the Neo-Babylonian language.

== Sources ==
- Archaeology news about Bardak Siah of Iran
