= Habib Sabet =

Iranian businessman (1903–1993)

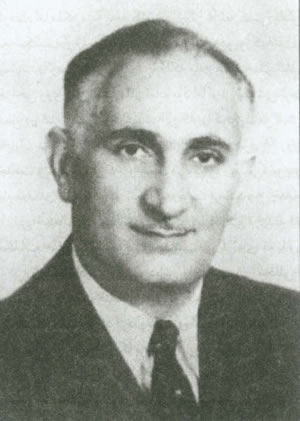
- Sabet in 1964
- Born: 1903; Tehran, Sublime State of Iran
- Died: 1990 (aged 86–87); Los Angeles, United States
- Occupation: Businessman
- Known for: Founder of the first television station in Iran

Habib Sabet (Persian: حبیب ثابت; 1903 – 1990) was a businessman and follower of the Baháʼí Faith. He was one of Iran's major industrialists.

== Biography ==
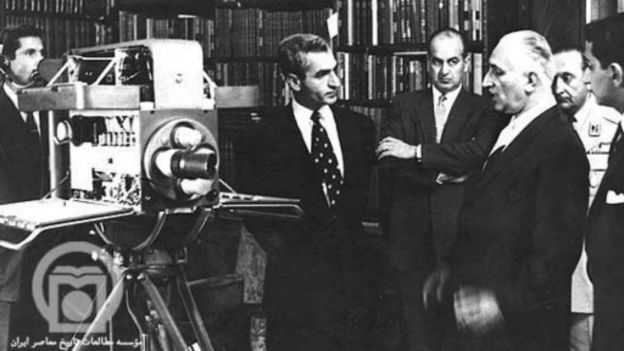
Mohammad Reza Pahlavi (the last Shah of Iran) with Habib Sabet during a visit to a television centre

Sabet was born in Tehran in 1903. Both his maternal and paternal grandparents were Iranian Jews who had converted to the Bahá’i Faith. He began to involve in business selling tobacco and renting bicycles. In 1925, he went to Beirut where he started his transport services between Tehran and Baghdad. In the 1950s, his business activities expanded and mostly included car dealerships, manufacturing, and agricultural machinery.

One of his companies was Firooz Trading Company. He was granted the franchises of many American and European brands, including General Electric, Kelvinator, Westinghouse and Volkswagen. In 1955, he managed to acquire the rights to bottle Pepsi Cola in Iran. However, the same year due to the anti-Baháʼí movements, and the fatwa of Ayatollah Hossein Borujerdi against Pepsi, Sabet became the target of attacks.

Sabet was also the founder of Iran's first television station. His television station was called "Iran Television" which was launched in Tehran on 23 October 1958.

Sabet left Iran before the Iranian Revolution in 1979, and he spent his remaining years in Paris, France. He died at the Cedars-Sinai Medical Center in Los Angeles of congestive heart failure in 1990 at the age of 86. He had the Sabet Pasal built in Tehran, a palace modeled after the Petit Trianon in Versailles. His companies and other assets were confiscated by the Islamic government of Iran shortly after its establishment.

== See also ==
- Television in Iran
