= Safi Abad Palace =

Historic palace in Iran

Safiabad Palace
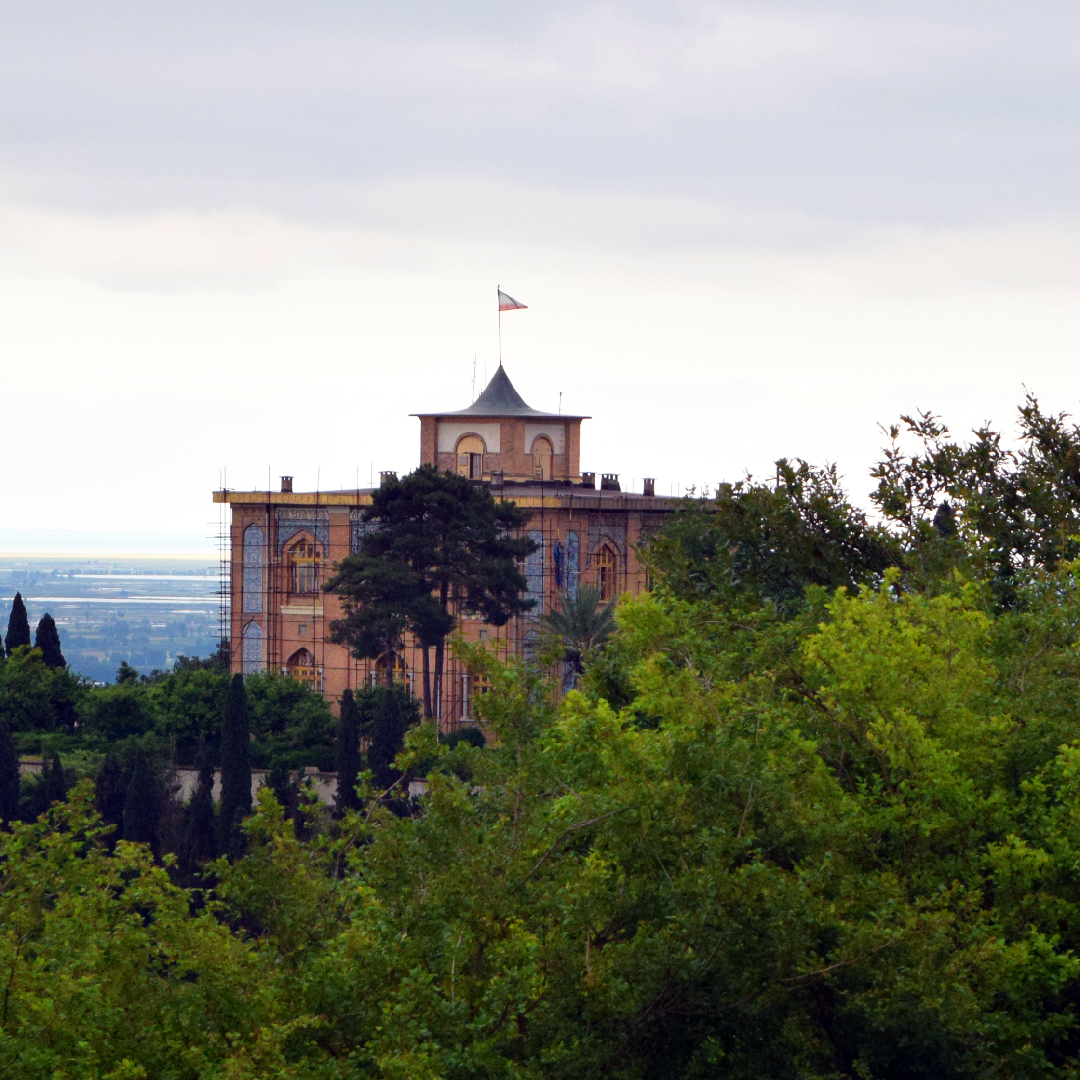

- Location within Iran
- 36°41′15.1″N 53°31′36.8″E

Iran National Heritage List
- Official name: Safiabad Palace
- Type: Palace
- Designated: 1932
- Reference no.: 58
- Conservation organization: Cultural Heritage, Handicrafts and Tourism Organization of Iran

Safi Abad Palace (Persian: کاخ صفی‌آباد) is a historic Safavid era (1501–1736) palace located near Behshahr in Iran's Mazandaran province. Square and with a two-story edifice, Safi Abad Palace is small compared to other works of Safavid architecture. Once adorned with coloured tiles both internally and externally, Safi Abad Palace contains various elements of Safavid architecture, including vibrant tiling, a dome in the interior, and a ornamental garden surrounding the palace.

== History ==
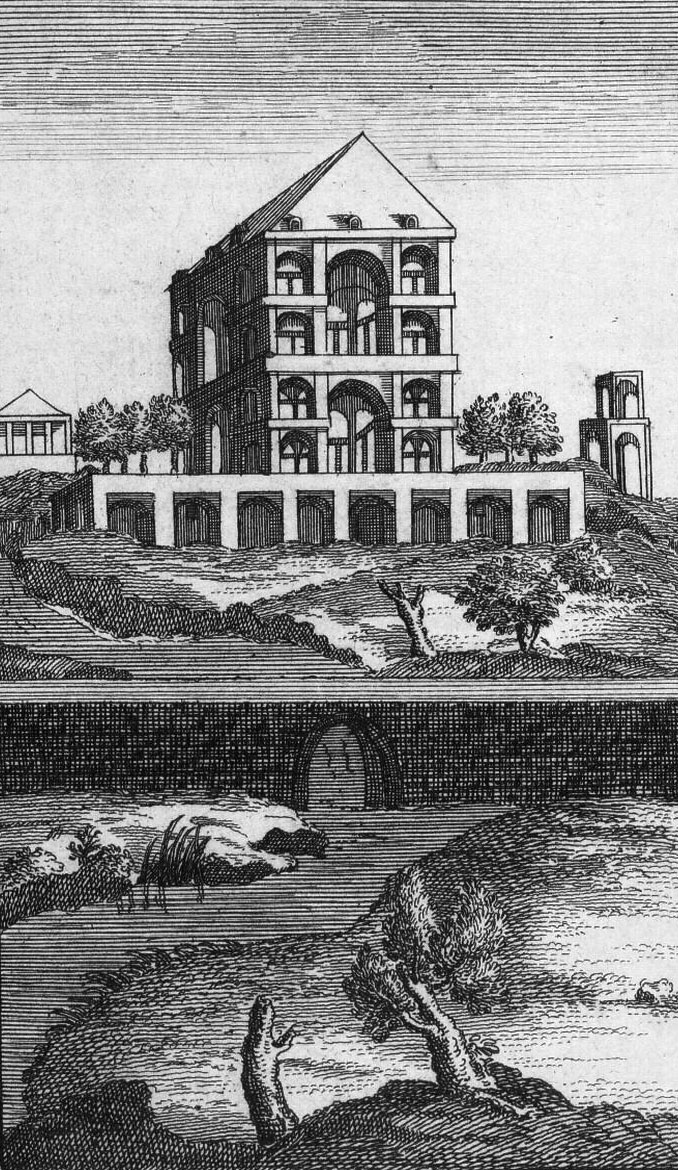
Safi Abad Palace by Jean Chardin, 1670s

Built during the reign of Shah Abbas the Great (r. 1587–1629), the palace was expanded later on and, after suffering extensive damage due to a fire in the early 20th century, was repaired during the Pahlavi era (1925–1979). Safi Abad Palace may have once been connected to the garden of the shah of Behshahr, however there isn't enough evidence to either prove or disprove this claim.

Recently, Safi Abad Palace has come under threat due to the 2026 Iran War, with its location in Mazadaran making it particularly vulnerable to damage from air strikes or other military attacks.

== Gallery ==
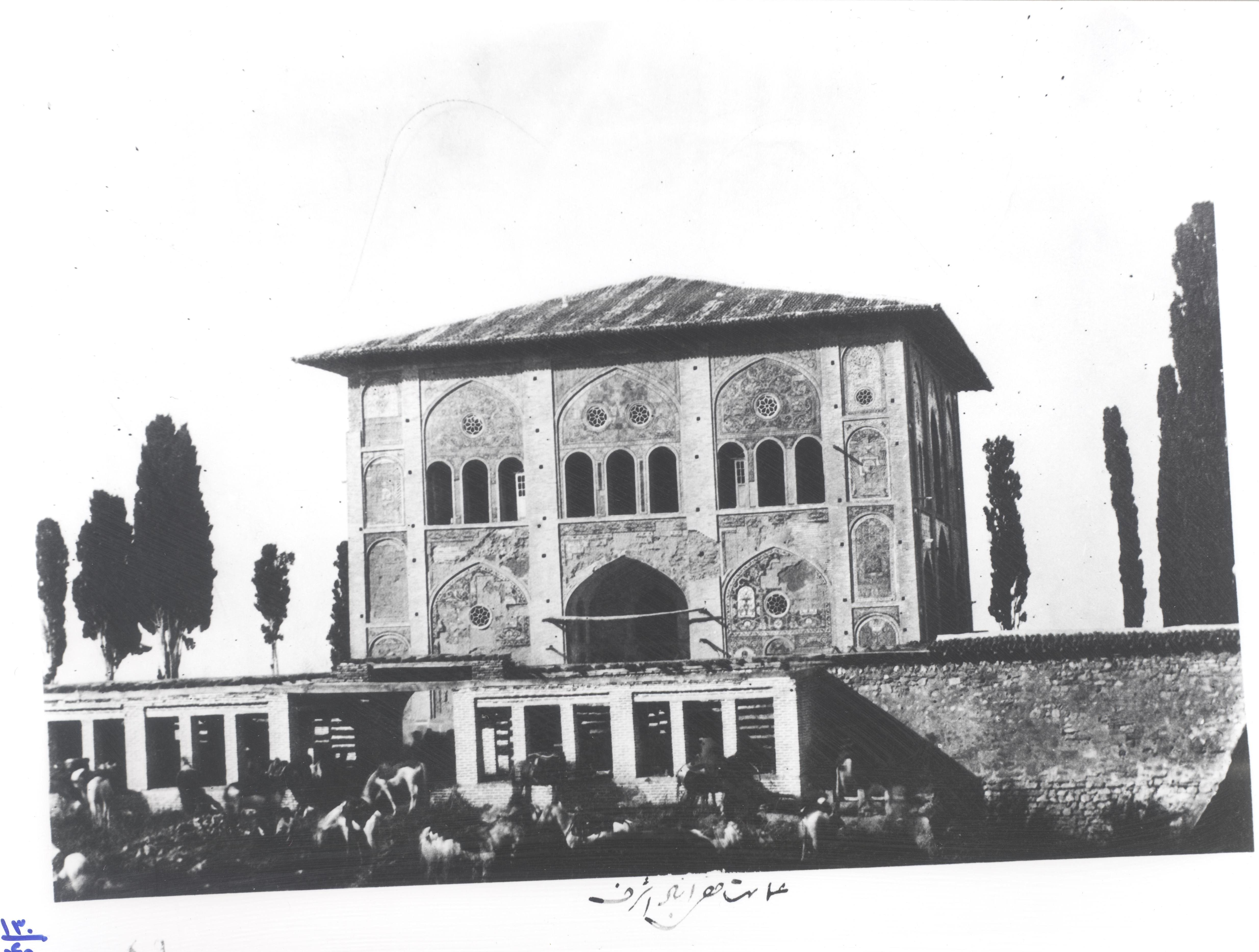
Safi Abad Palace, 1875

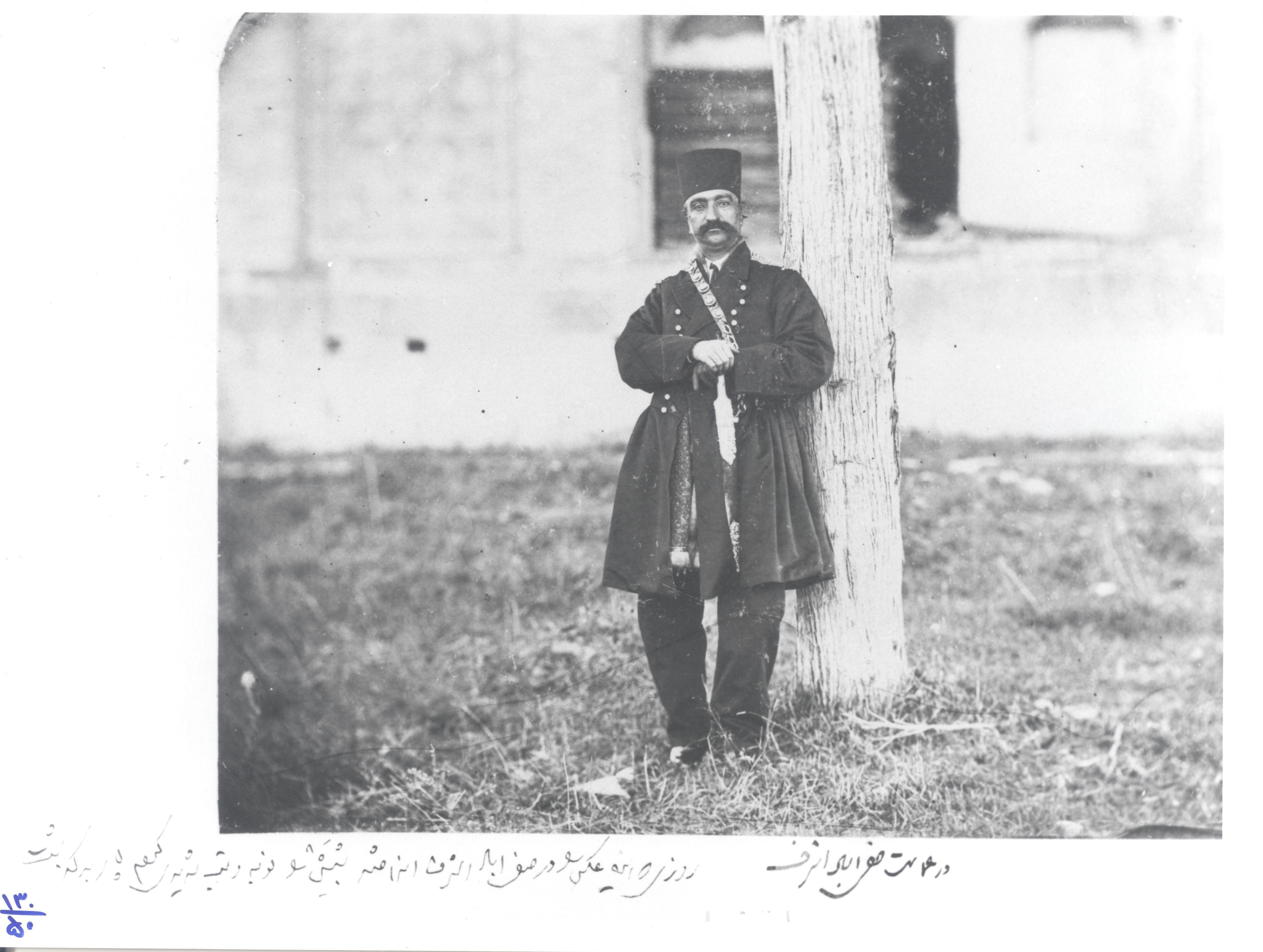
Naser al-Din Shah Qajar at Safi Abad Palace, 1875
