= Temukan =

Coordinates: 29°15′27.07″N 51°11′19.73″E

Temukan, also known as Tamouken, or Toukeh, Taokè as called by Greeks, is an ancient city in Iran, dating back to the Achaemenid era. It was discovered by archaeologists in April 2005 while conducting excavations at Borazjan in the Dashtestan county of the southern Iranian province of Bushehr.

Temukan hosts the Bardak-e Siyah Palace. Archaeologists had thought that the site was part of Tawwaj, however, other discoveries in the region, made in 2004 and 2005, indicate that Tawwaj is actually several kilometers away from the site.
