= Sabet Pasal Palace =

Historic palace in Tehran, Iran

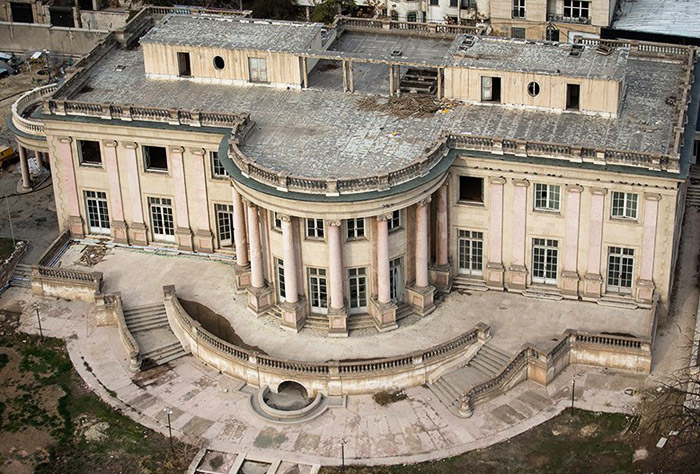
- Interactive map of the Sabet Pasal Palace area

General information
- Location: Tehran, Iran
- Coordinates: 35°46′50″N 51°25′20″E
- Completed: 1961
- Client: Habibollah Sabet

Sabet Pasal Palace (Persian: کاخ ثابت پاسال) is a historic palace located north of Nelson Mandela Boulevard in Tehran, Iran. Nicknamed the "Stone Palace" and "Iran's palace of Versailles", it is Tehran's largest historic house.

== History ==
The palace belonged to Habibollah Sabet (also known as Sabet Pasal), a rich Iranian businessman and the founder of Iran's first television station. The palace was seized by the Mostazafan Foundation following the 1979 Iranian Revolution and eventually became the property of Ali Ansari, managing director of Ayandeh Bank.

In 2015, the demolition of the palace was planned by the municipality. In May 2017, Iran's Ministry of Cultural Heritage, Tourism and Handicrafts obtained an agreement of non-demolition from the owner of the palace. On 12 June 2017, it was added to the Iran National Heritage List.

== Description ==
The Sabet Pasal Palace was modeled after the Petit Trianon in Versailles.

== Gallery ==
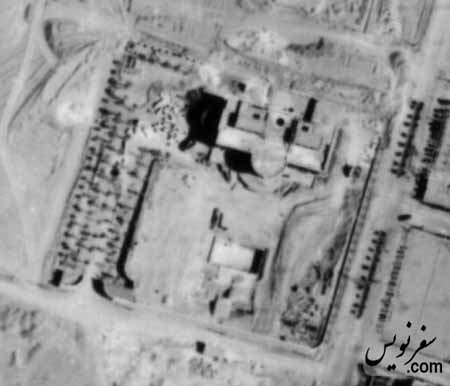

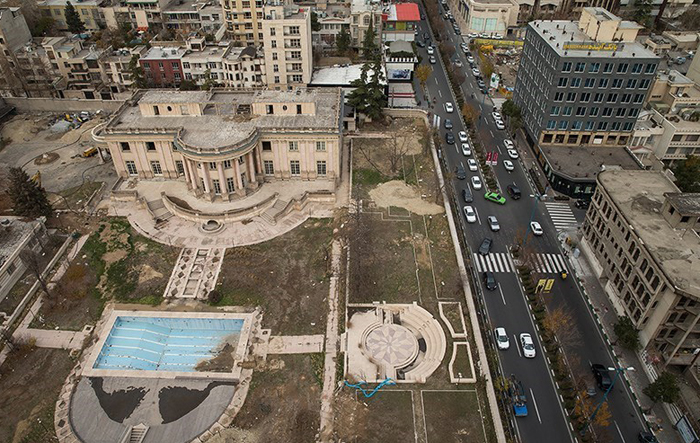

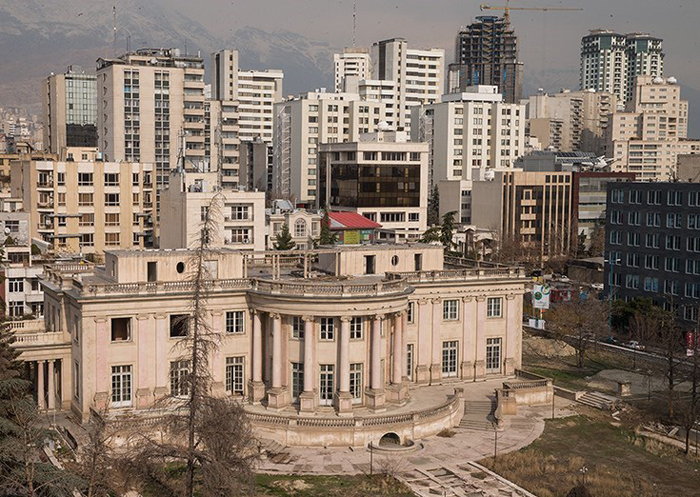

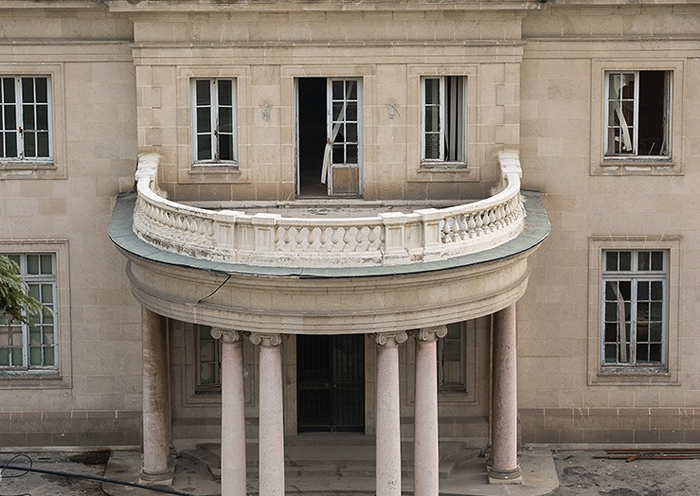

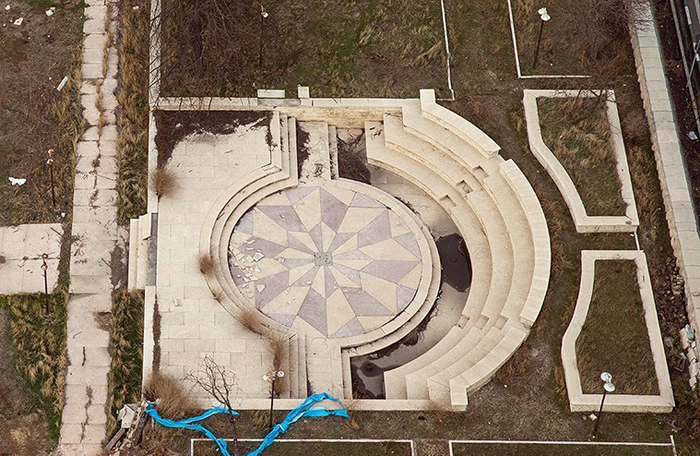

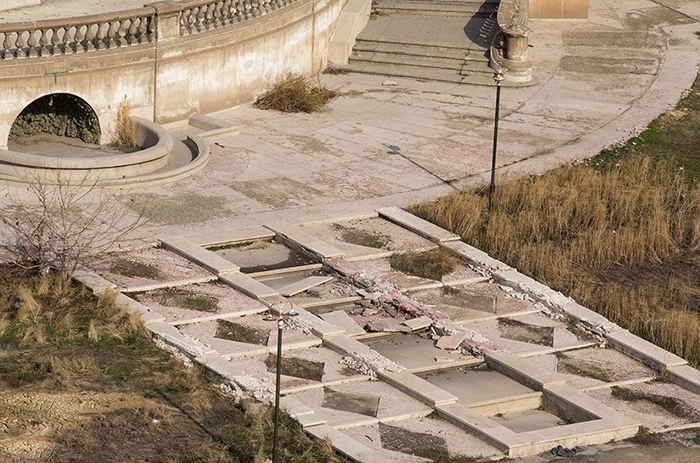
