= Qajar Palace =

Historic site in Tehran, Iran

- قصر قاجار (Persian)
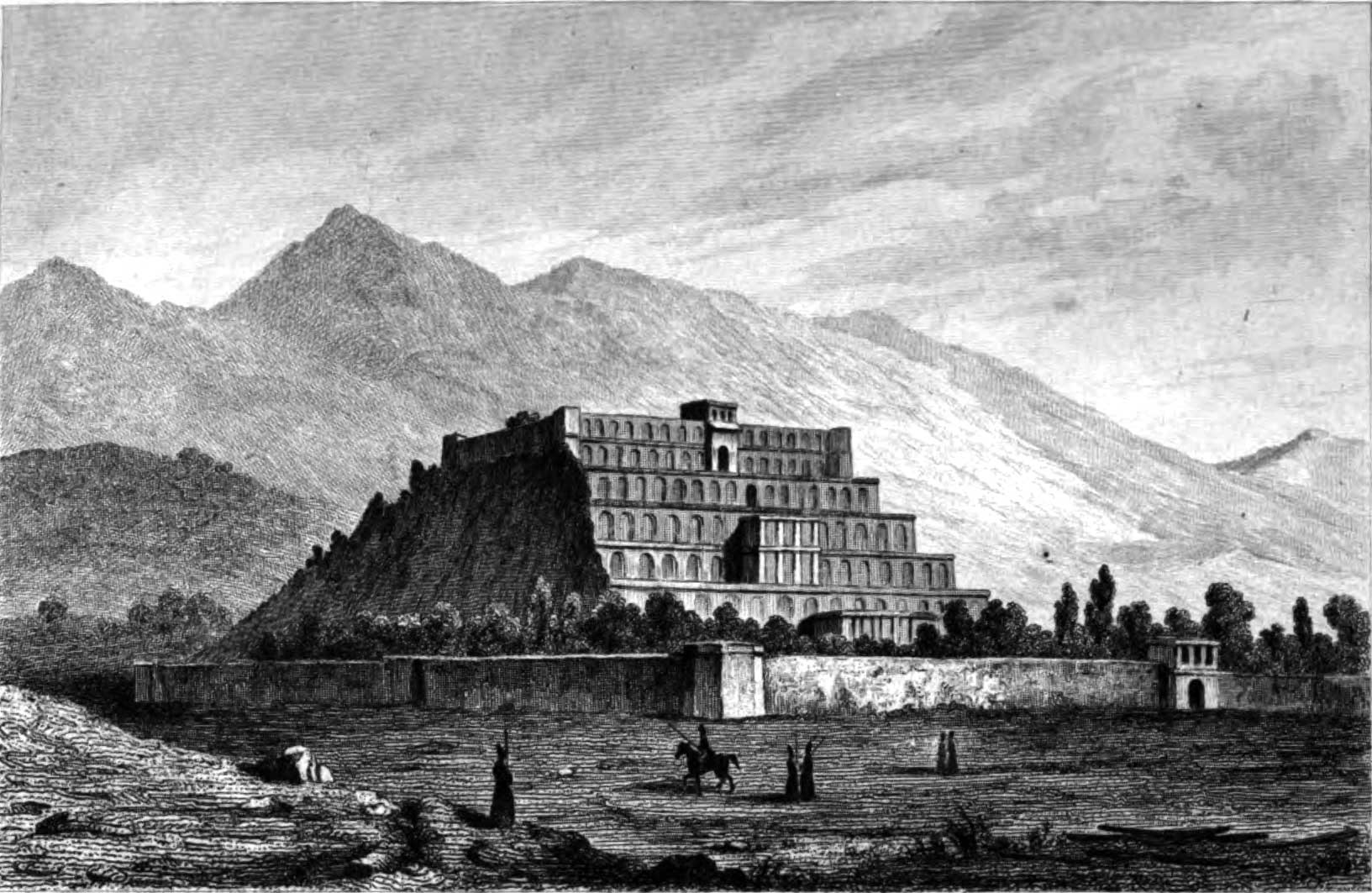
- An etching artwork of the palace from Louis Dubeux's La Perse
- Interactive map of Qajar Palace
- 35°43′44″N 51°26′54″E
- Location: Tehran, Iran

History
- Built for: Fath-Ali Shah Qajar
- Demolished: 1920s

Site notes
- Architectural style: Qajar style

The Qajar Palace (Persian: قصر قاجار, romanized: Qasr-e Qajar) was the name of a Qajar era palace in Tehran, Iran. It was demolished in the 1920s to be replaced by the Qasr prison. The only remaining structure of the palace complex is a small pavilion.

It had four watchtowers on its corners and did not feature windows on the outside, making it look more like a barracks than a palace.

== History ==
The palace was constructed in the second year of Fath-Ali Shah Qajar but fell out of use after his death. It was then used for military purposes during the reign of Naser al-Din Shah Qajar. In the 1920s, Reza Shah demolished and replaced it with the Qasr prison, Iran's first modern prison.

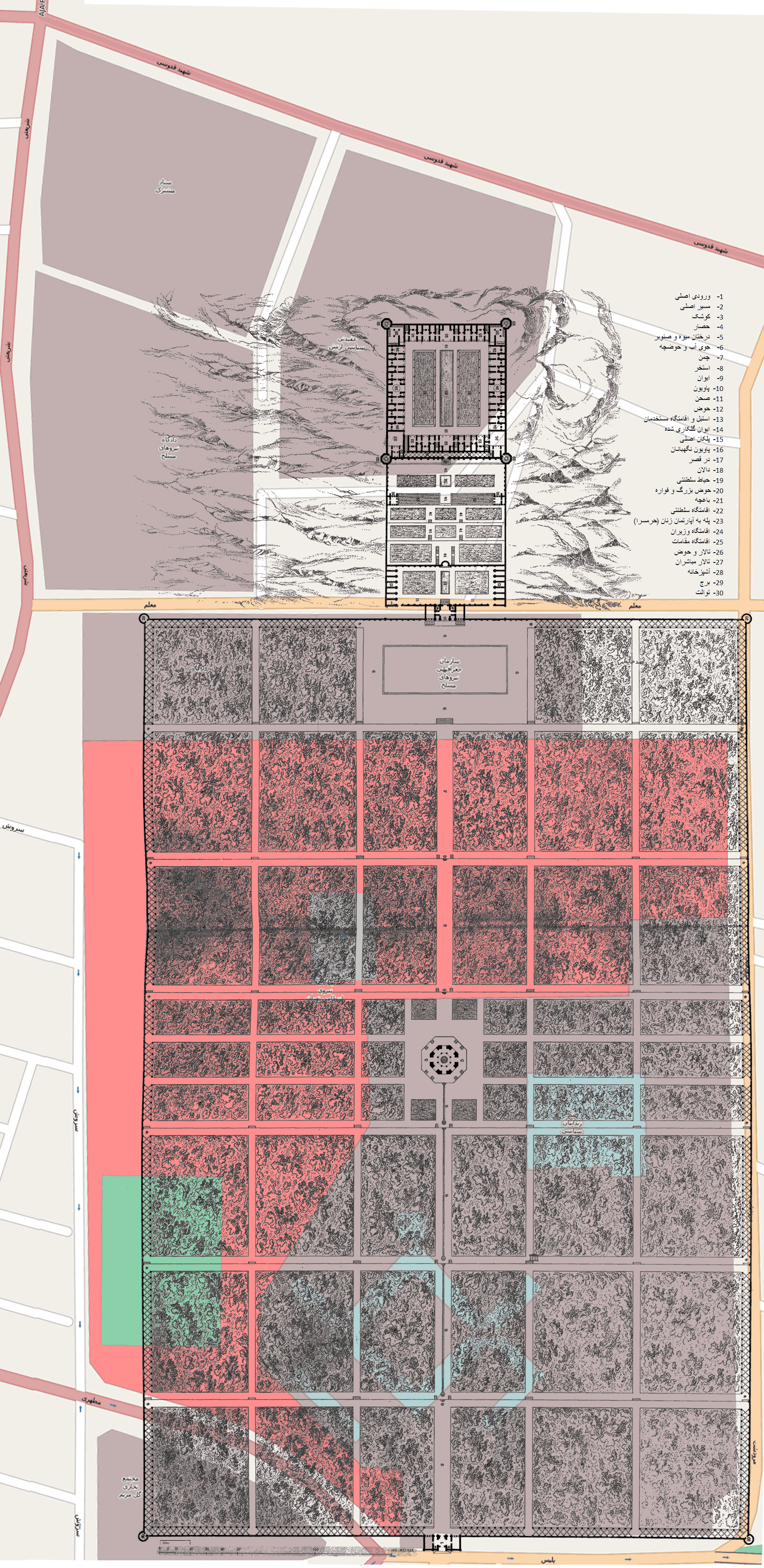
Plan drawing of the palace overlayed on a map of modern Tehran

The palace was depicted by Eugène Flandin and Pascal Coste, two Frenchmen who travelled to Iran during the reign of Mohammad Shah Qajar.

The prison that replaced it became a museum in 2011.

== Gallery ==
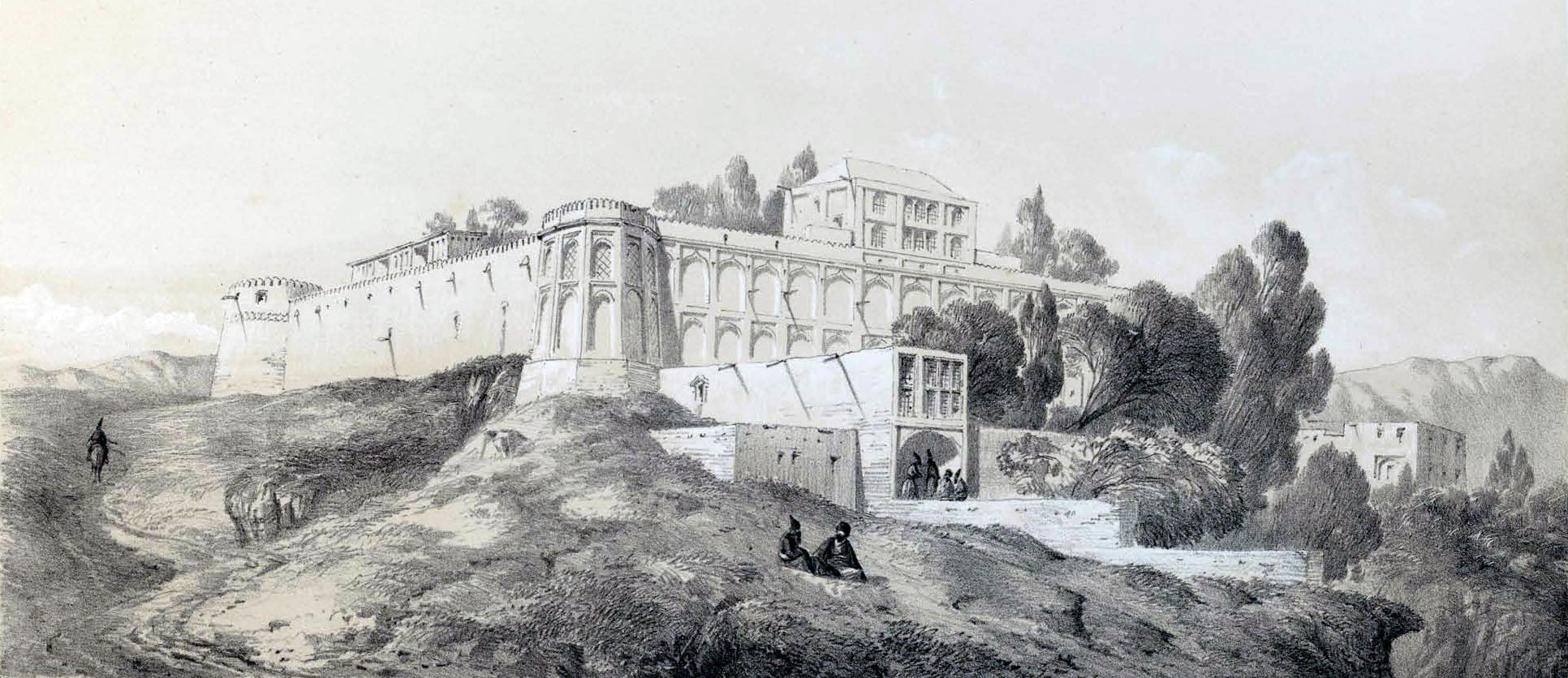
Sketch by Eugène Flandin, 1840

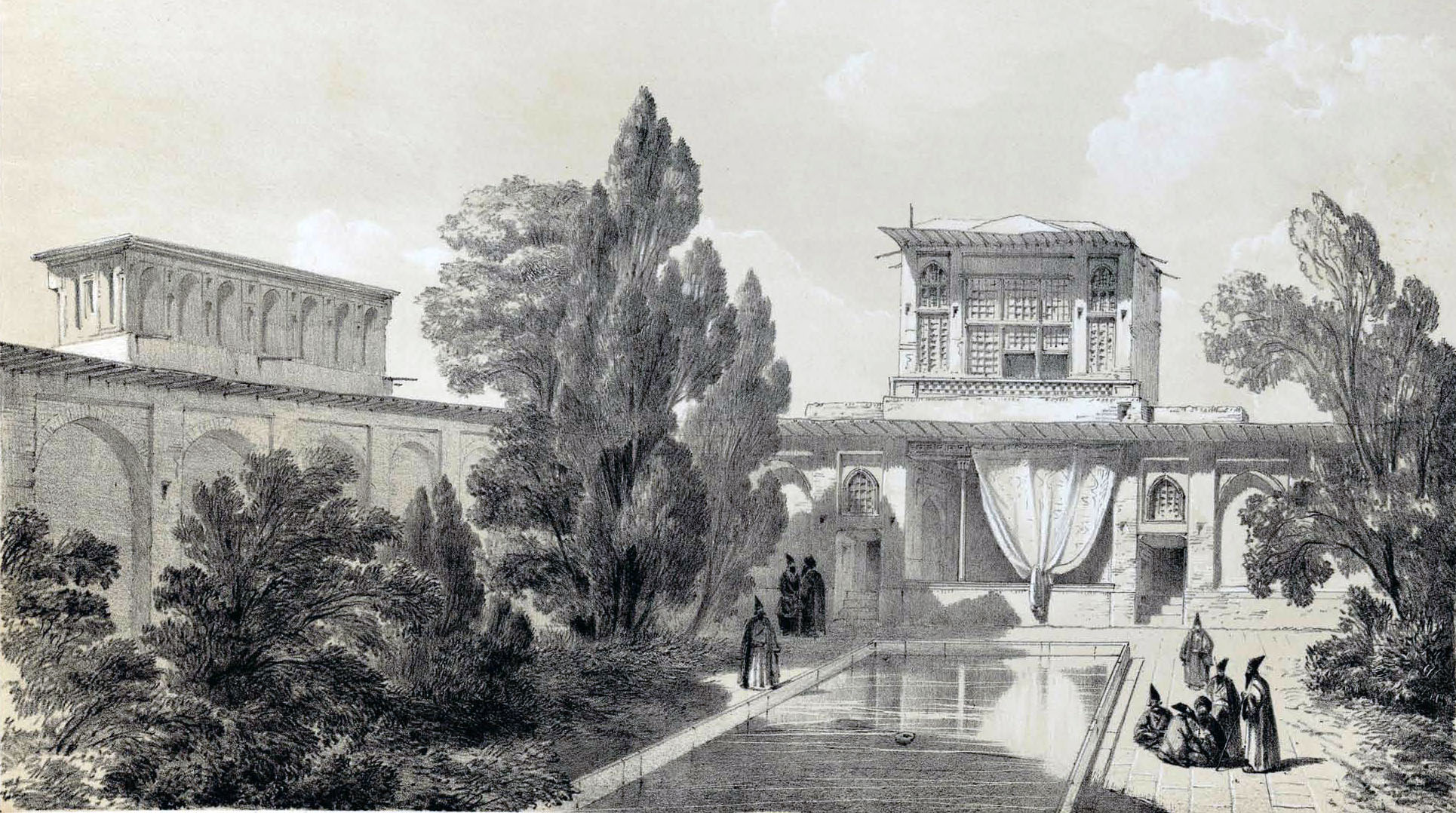
Sketch by Eugène Flandin, 1840

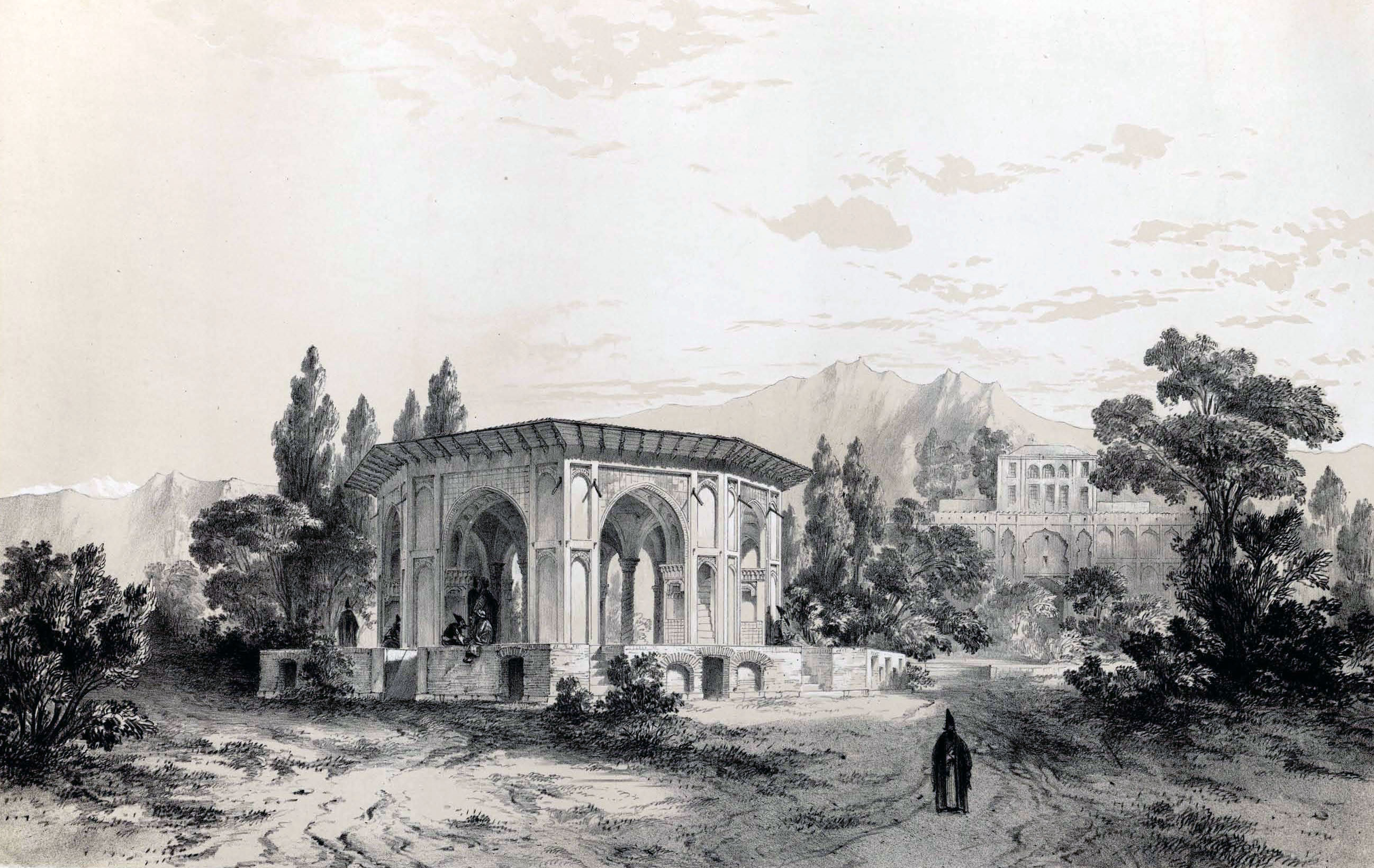
Sketch by Eugène Flandin, 1840. This is the only structure in the complex that still remains.

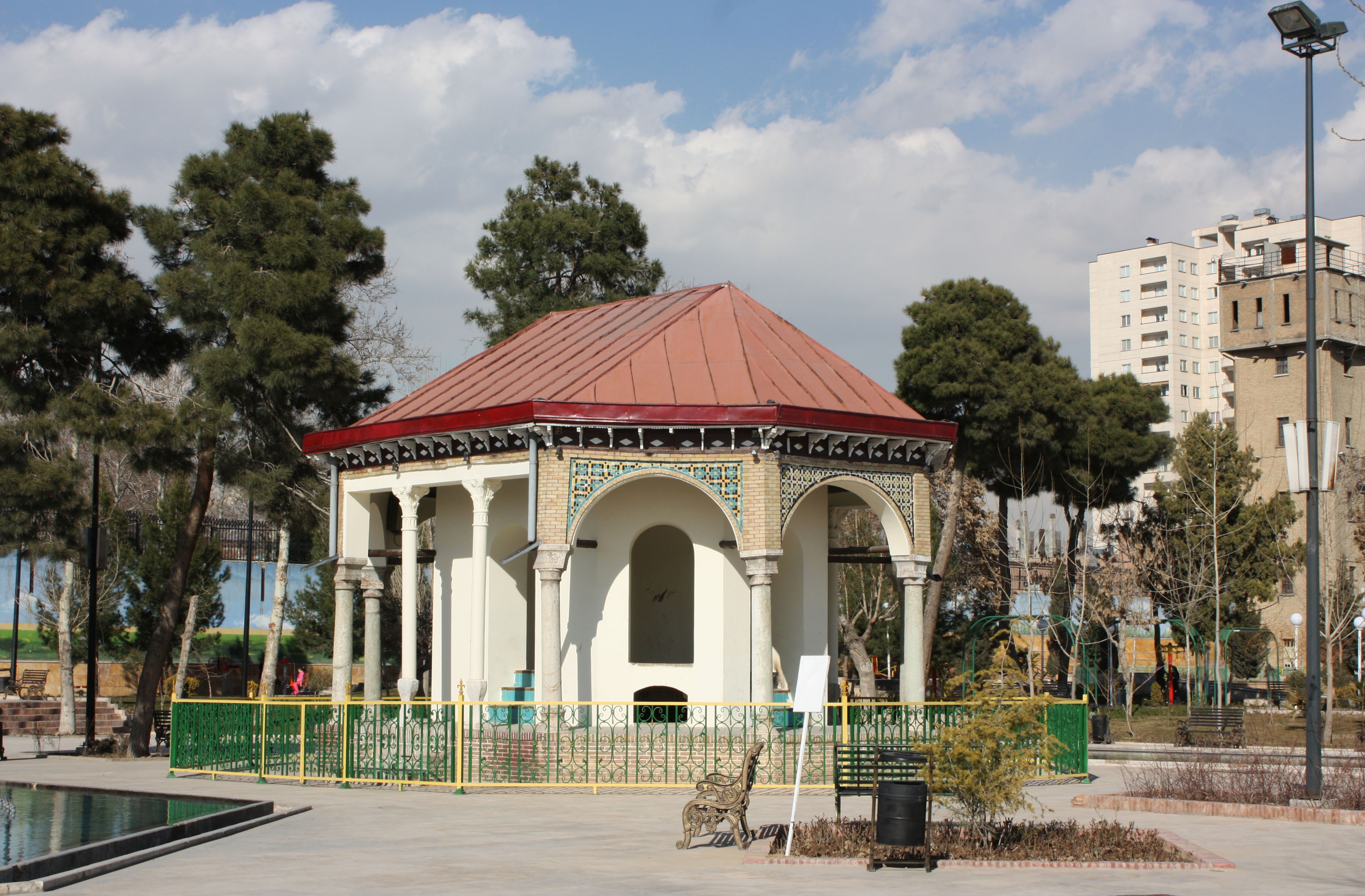
The only remaining structure in the complex.

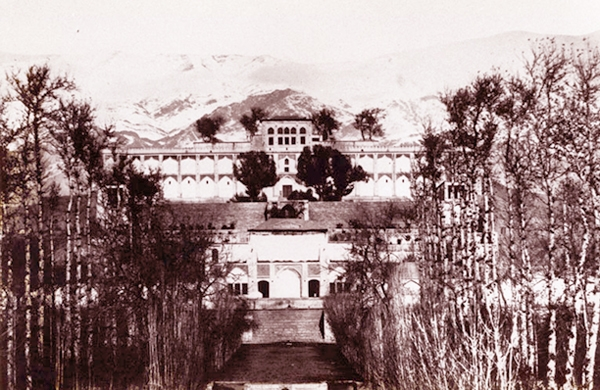
Photograph of the palace, 1860

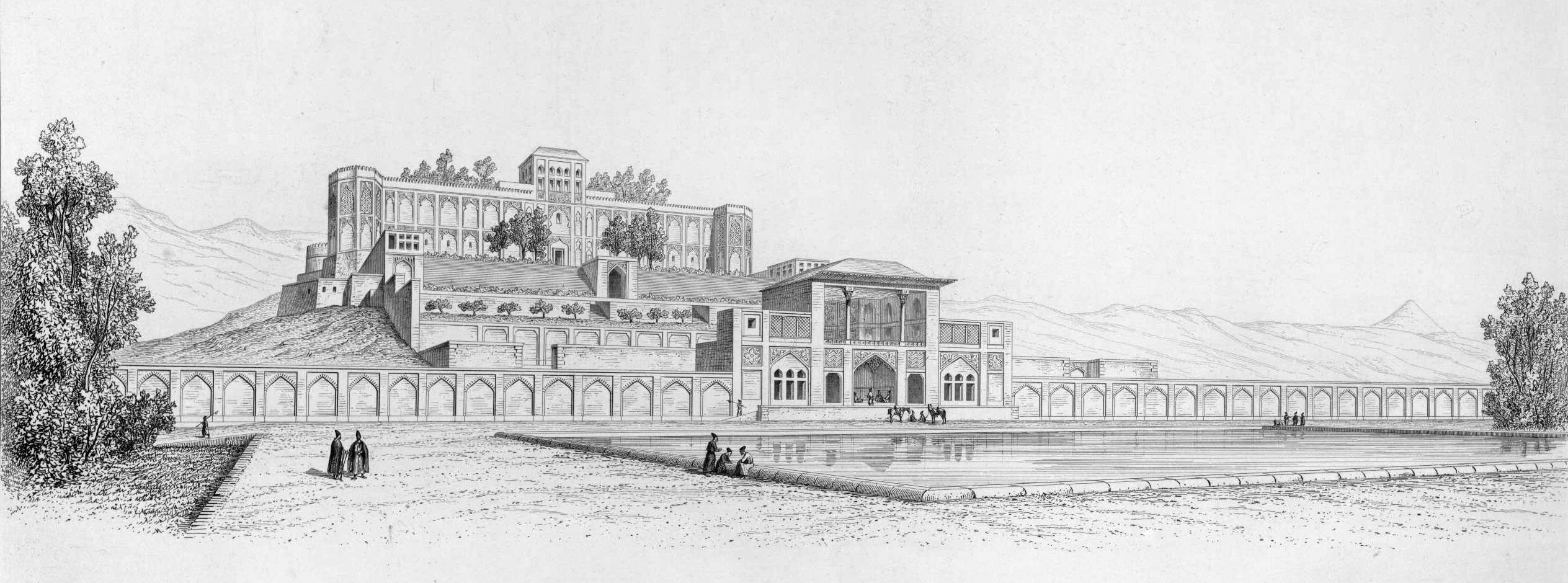
Sketch by Pascal Coste, 1840

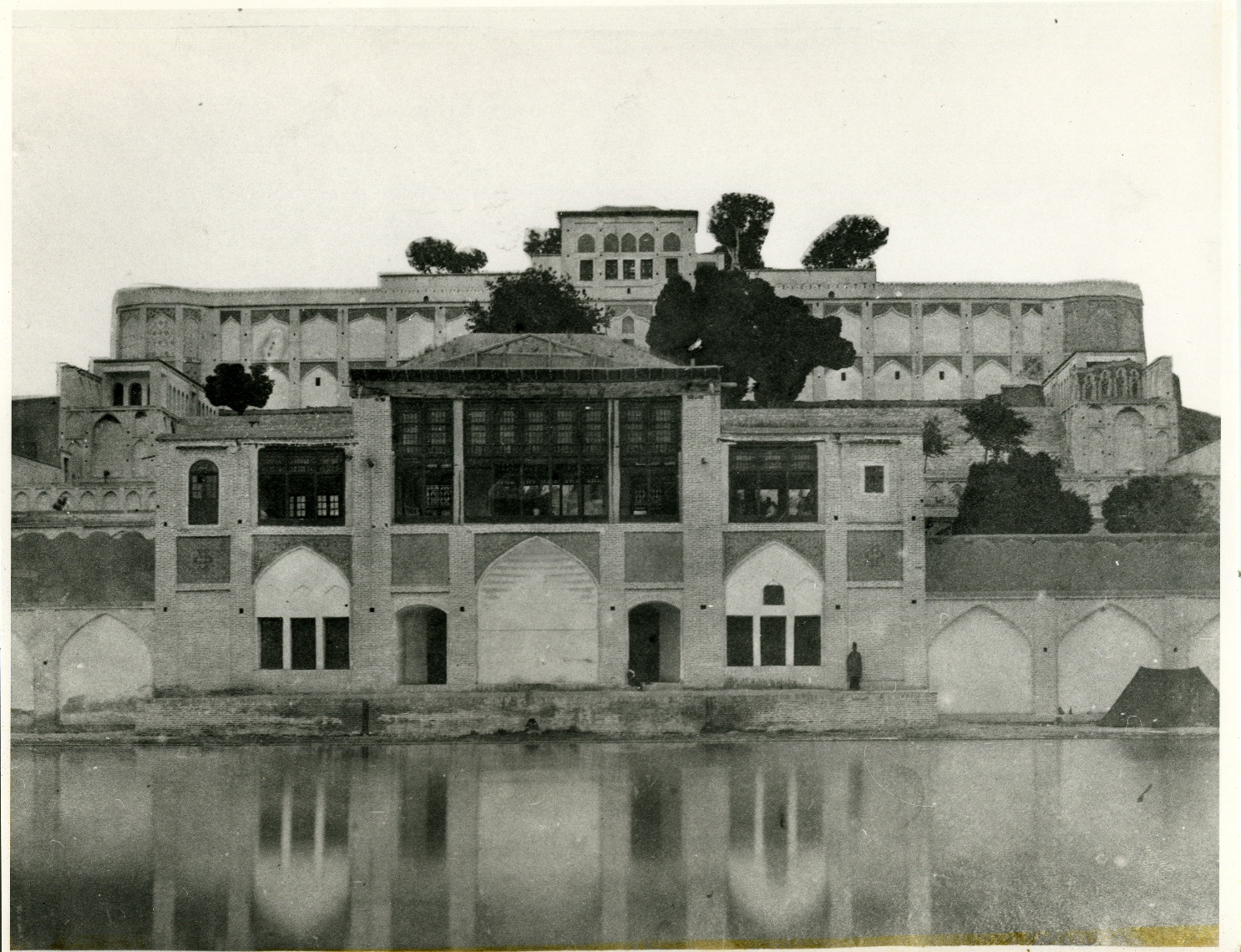
Photograph of the palace

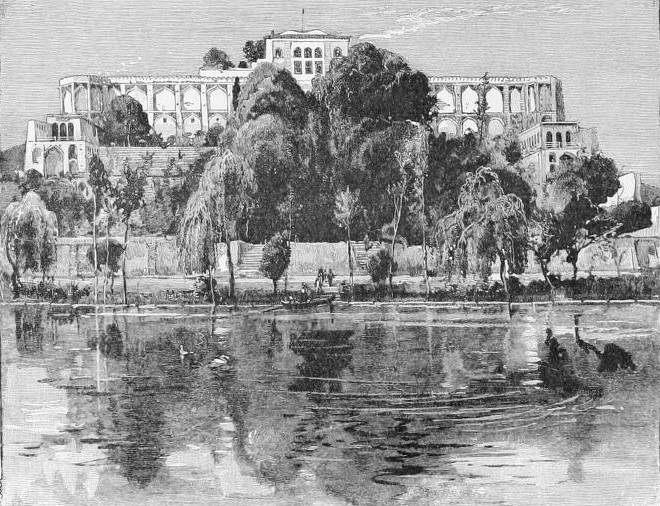
Sketch from Samuel Benjamin's 1887 book In Persia and the Persians
