= Ruby Palace =

National heritage site in Tehran, Iran

Coordinates: 35.7200°N 51.6036°E

- قصر یاقوت
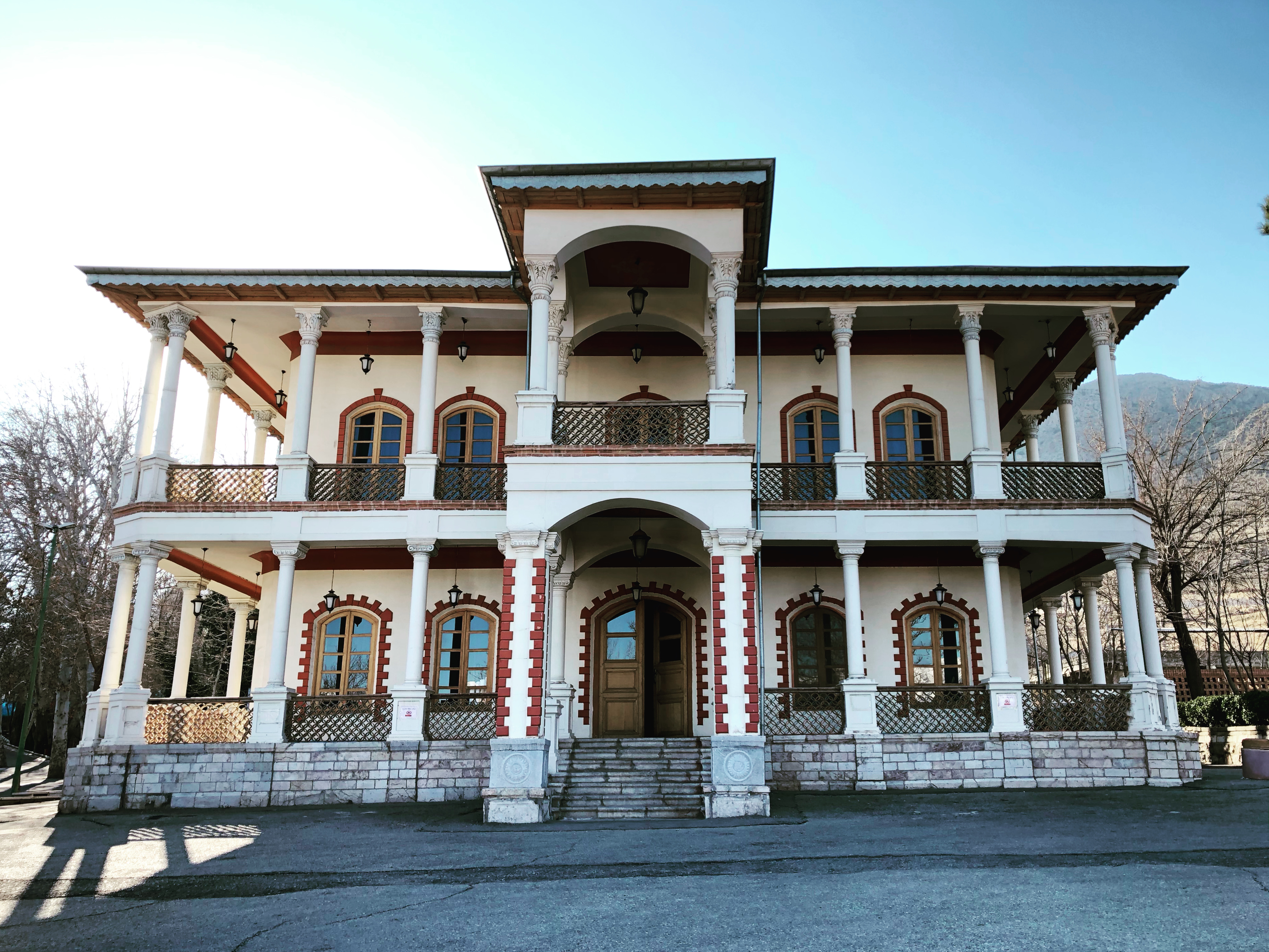
- Interactive map of the Ruby Palace area
- Alternative names: کاخ یاقوت، کاخ سرخه حصار

General information
- Architectural style: Qajar style
- Location: Tehran, Iran
- Completed: 1883
- Cost: 15,000 Tomans in 1883

The Ruby Palace (Persian: قصر یاقوت, romanized: Qasr-e Yaghut) is a palace in Tehran, Iran. Located in eastern Tehran, it was built in 1883 as a residence for Naser al-Din Shah Qajar.

== History ==
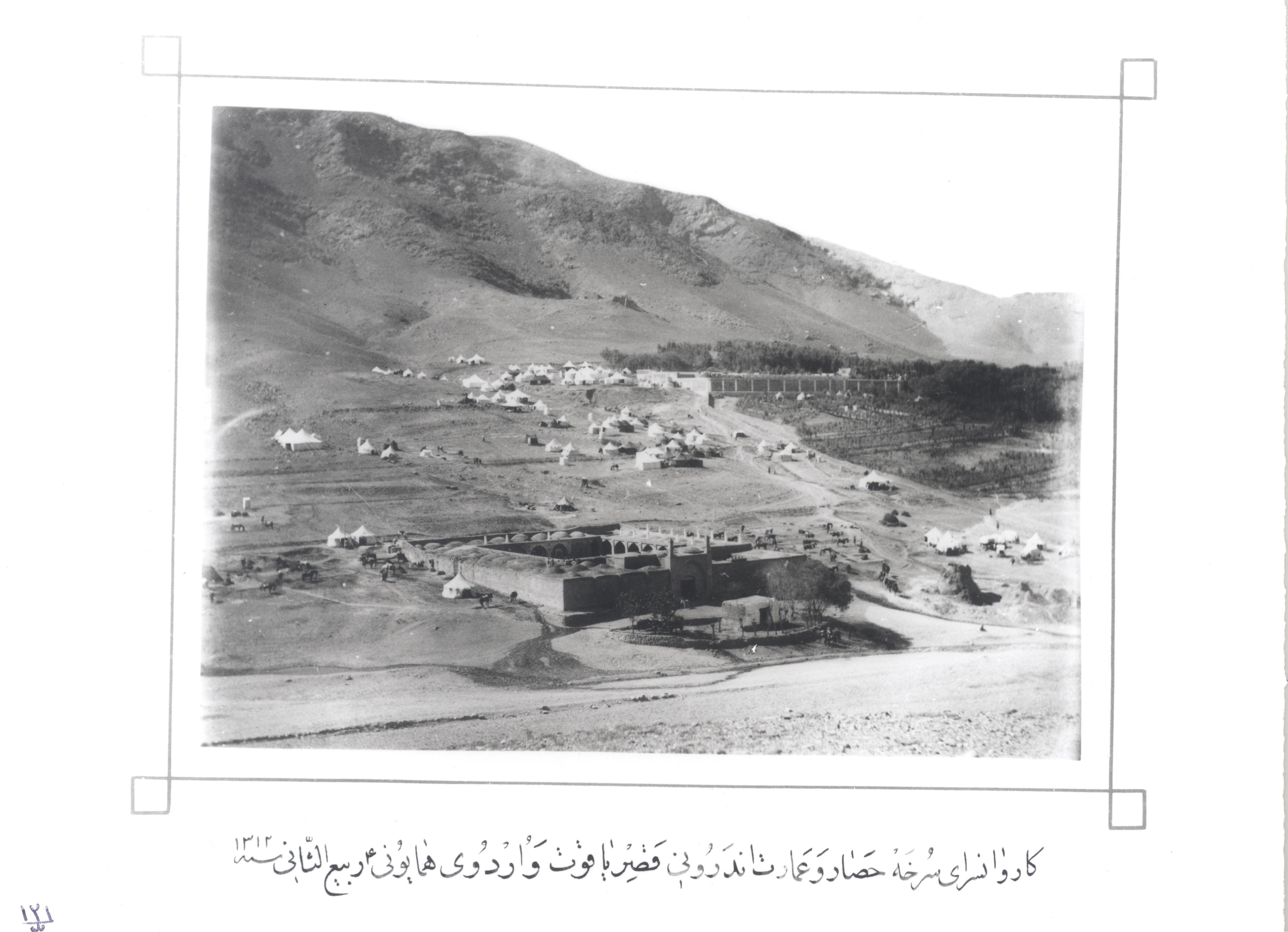
Photograph of the caravanserai and the andaruni of the Ruby palace

At the time of its construction, there used to be a caravanserai, a barracks and a bathhouse in the complex, but only the palace remains today. Overall, it used to have 200 rooms. At times, it was used as a residence for the Shah when he was hunting, and at other times, it served as the royal kitchen.

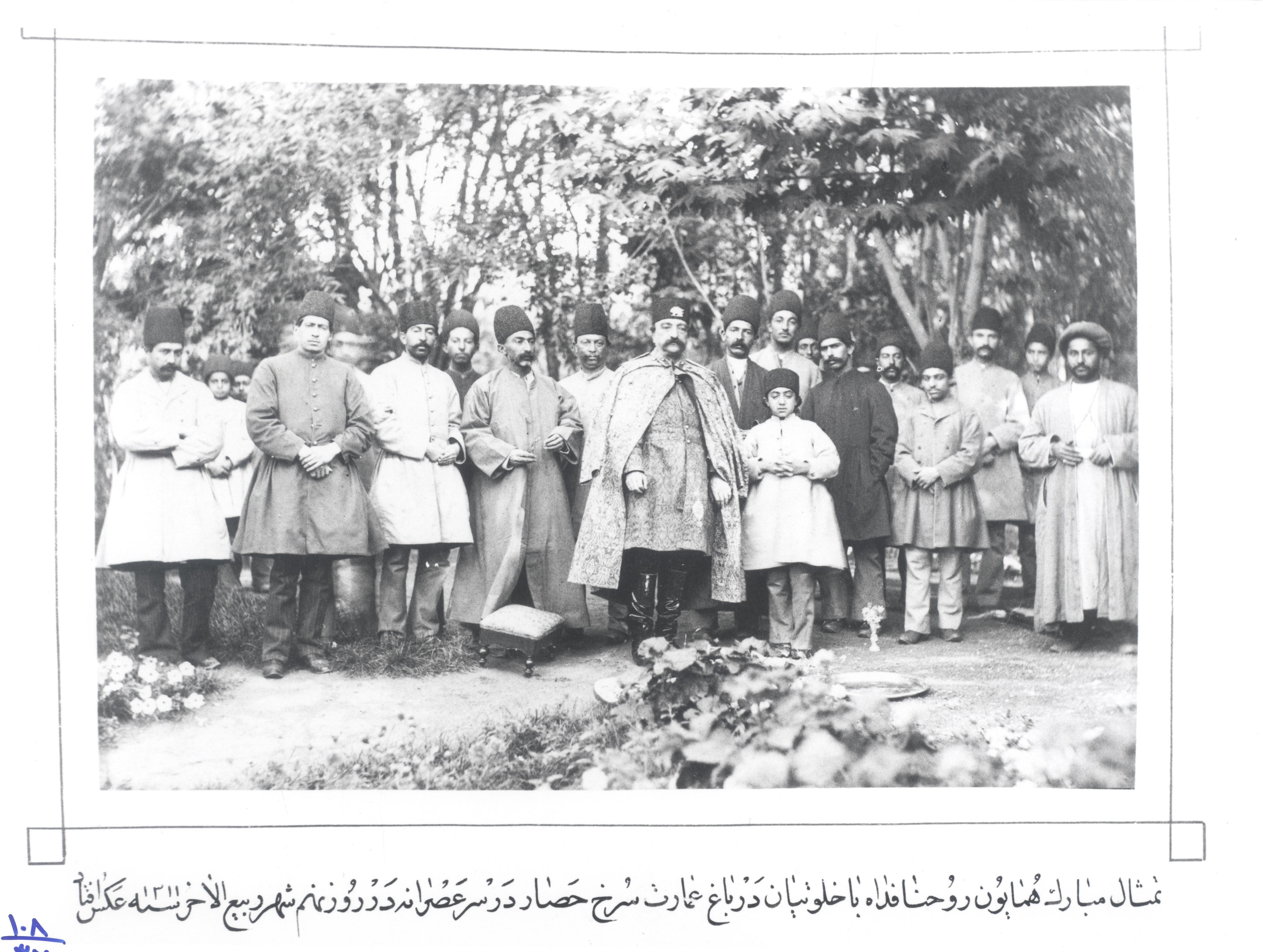
Naser al-Din Shah at the gardens of the Ruby palace

It was listed in the national heritage sites of Iran on 23 September 2003, with the number 10412.

== Gallery ==
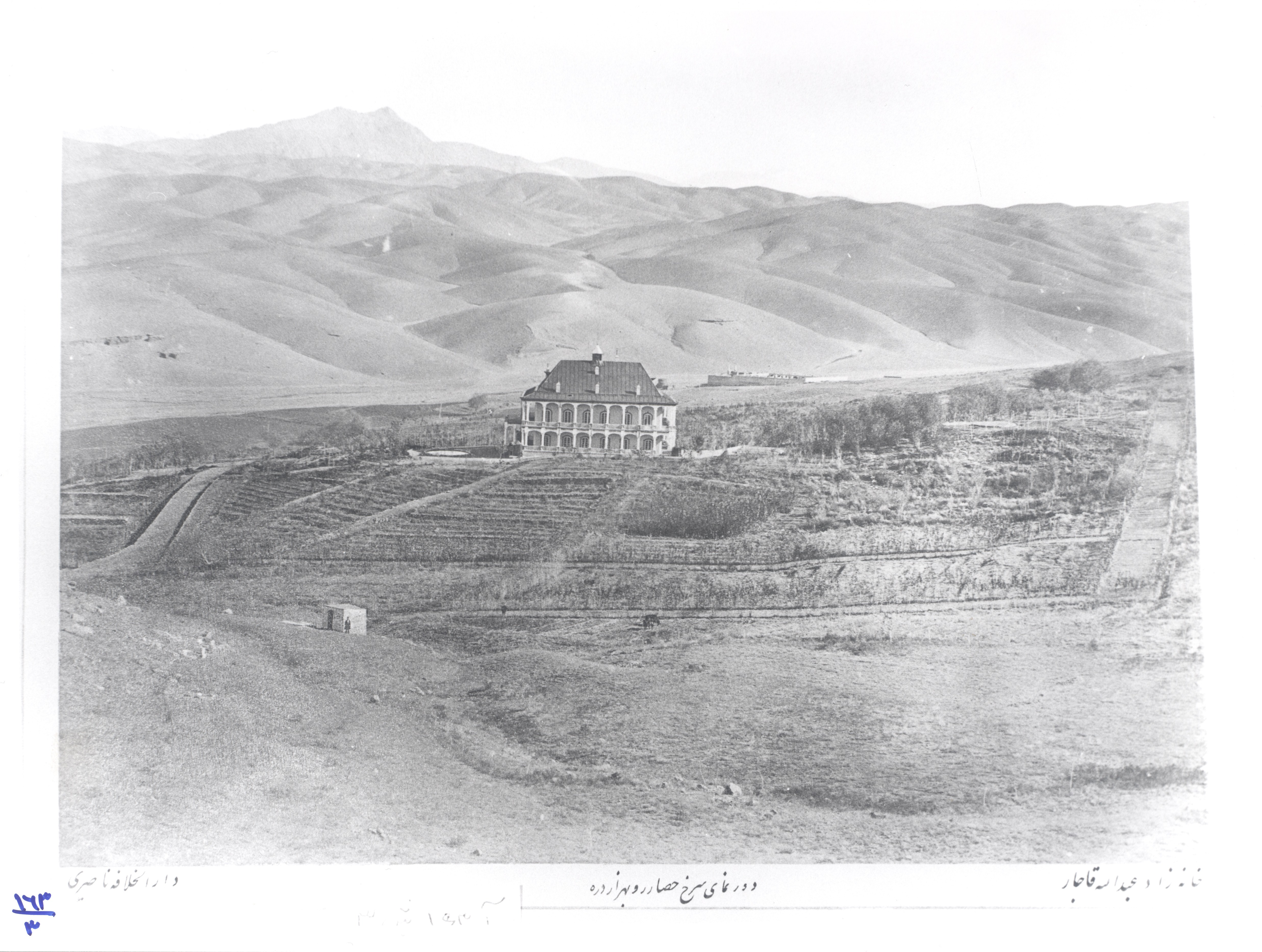
The palace from afar

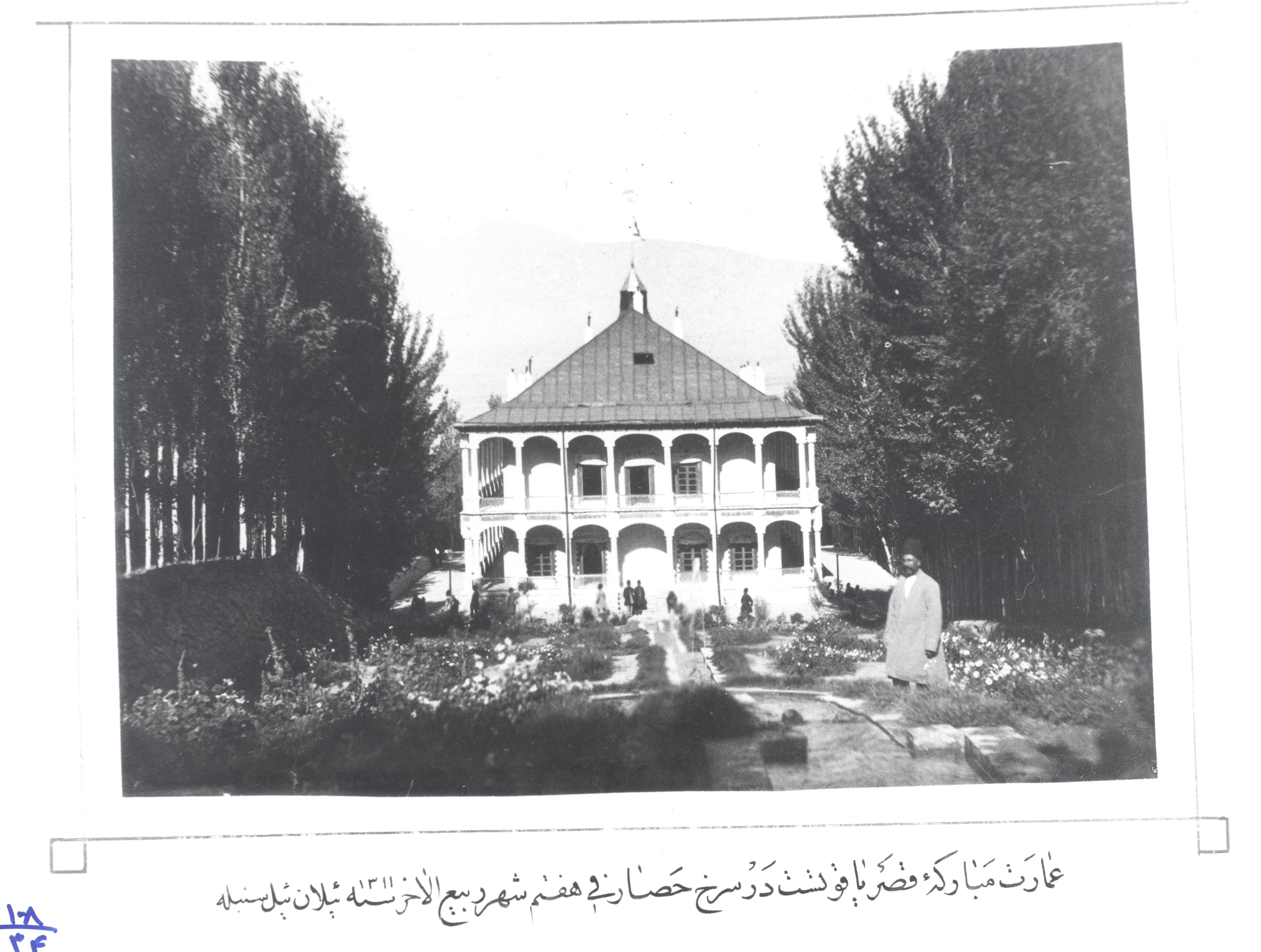
Photograph of the palace, 1893

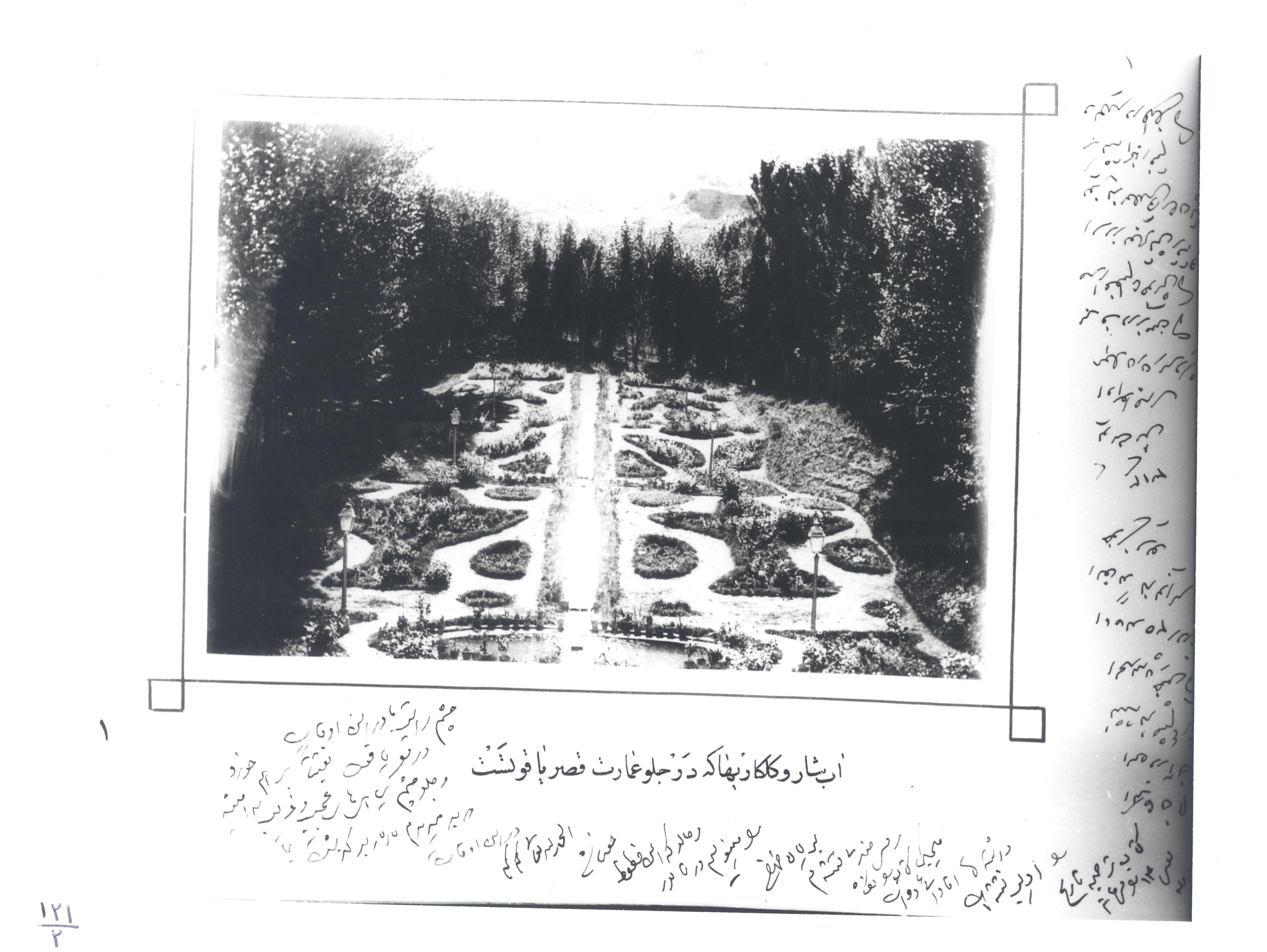
The garden in front of the palace

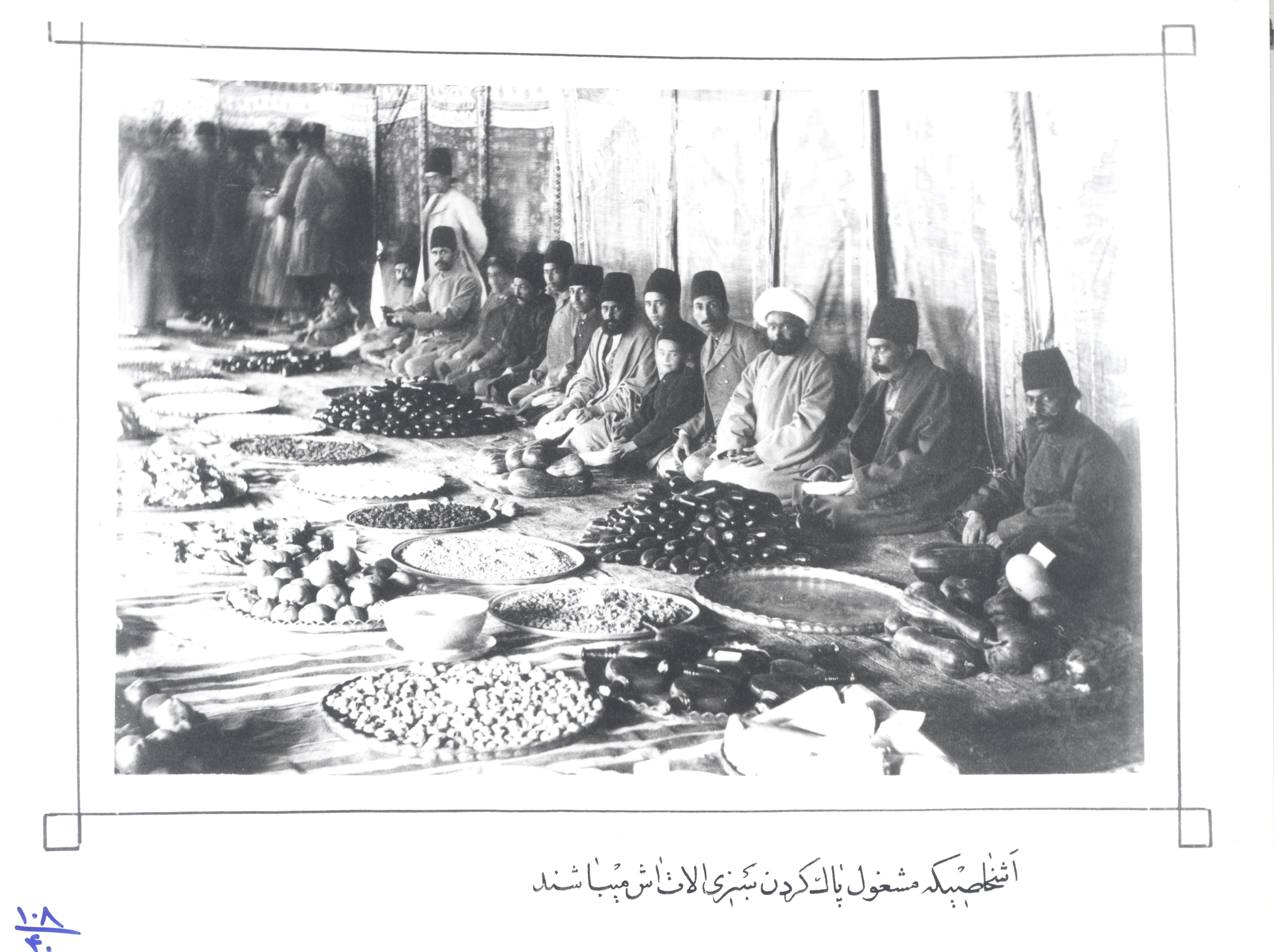
Food preparations

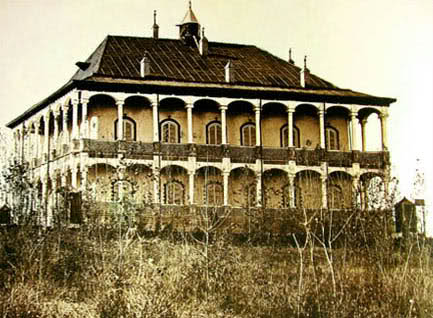
The palace in the last years of the Qajar era

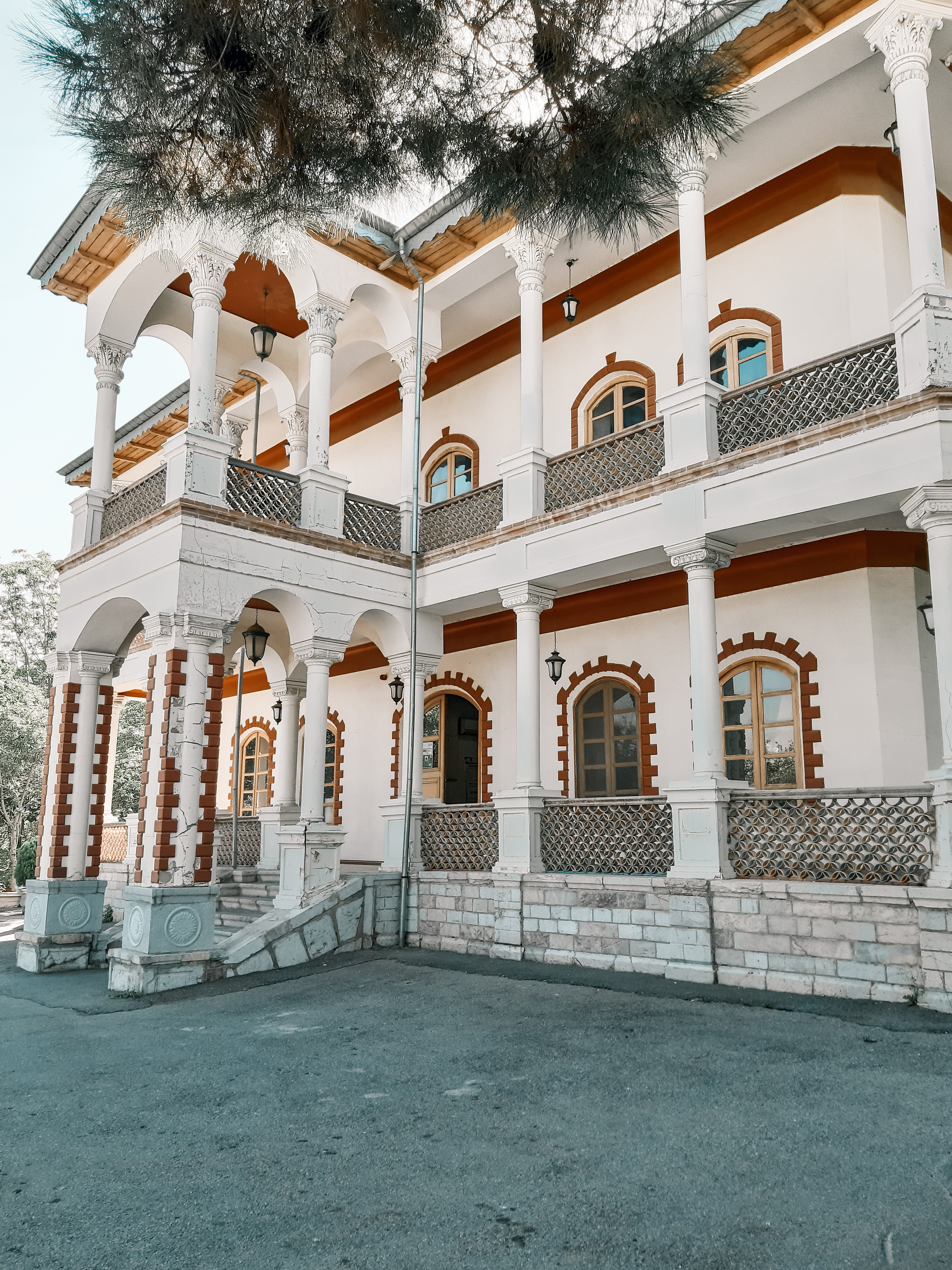

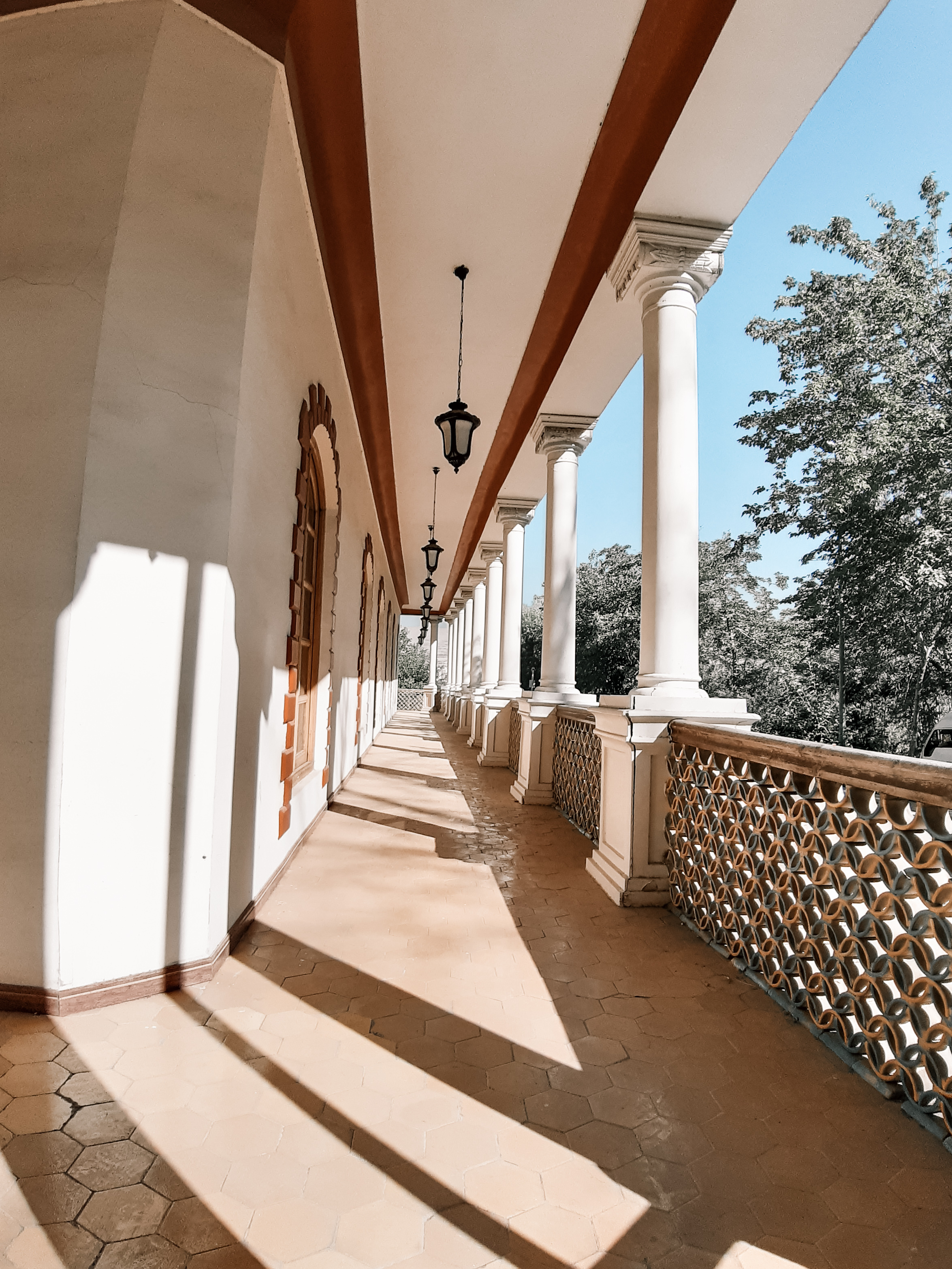

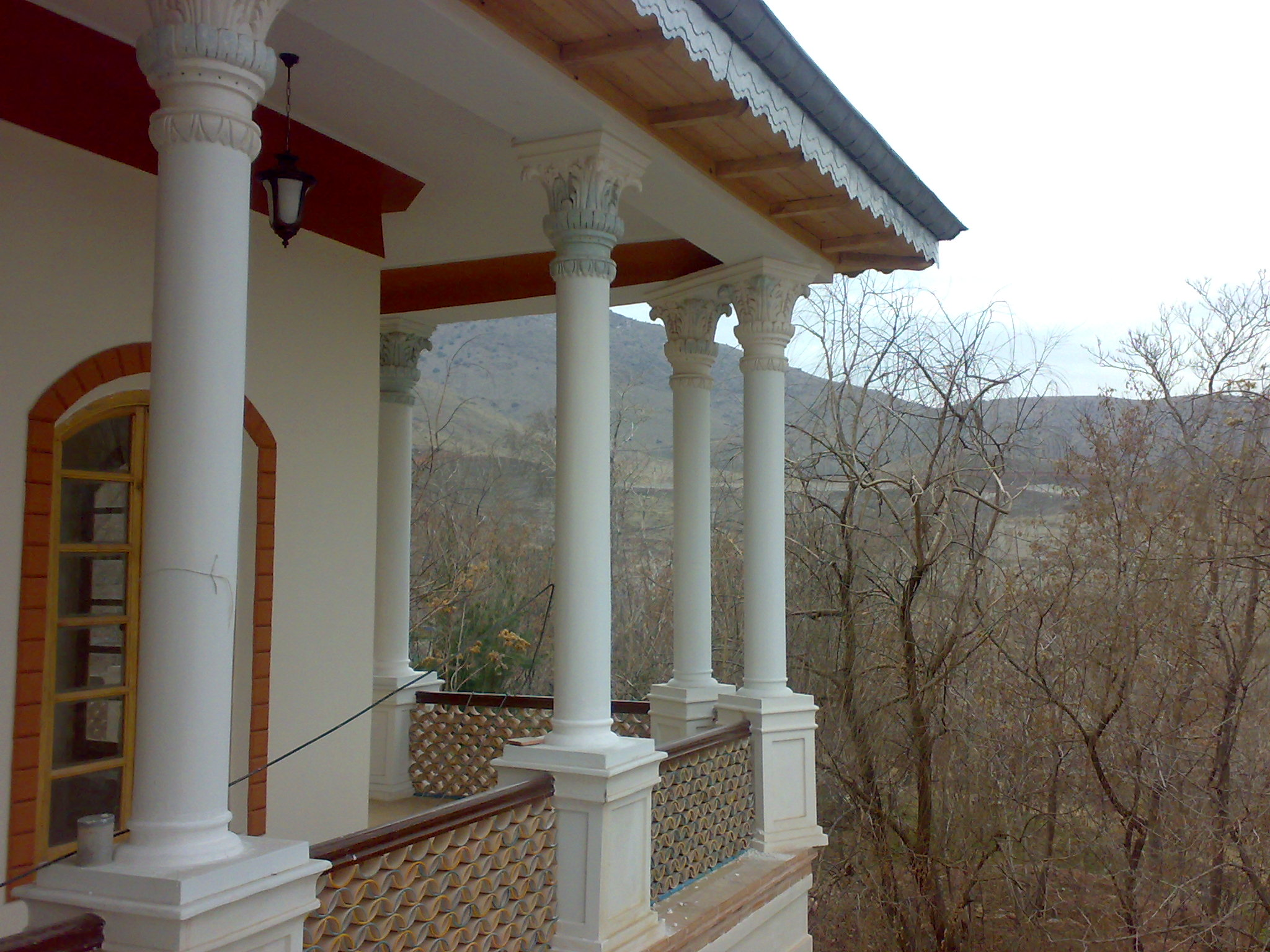
