= Borazjan =

City in Bushehr province, Iran

Borazjan Persian: برازجان
- City
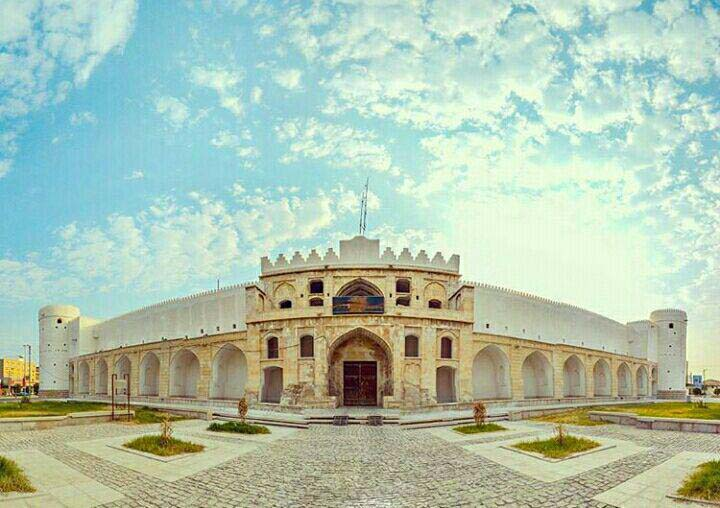
- Borazjan castle

- Location in Iran
- Coordinates: 29°16′10″N 51°13′12″E
- Country: Iran
- Province: Bushehr
- County: Dashtestan
- District: Central
- Established as a city: 1928

Government
  - Mayor: Morteza Ghoddousi
- Elevation: 80 m (260 ft)

Population (2016)
  - City: 110,567
  - Urban: 155,567
- Time zone: UTC+3:30 (IRST)
- Area code: 077-342
- Website: borazjancity.ir

Borazjan (Persian: برازجان) (Note: Also romanized as Borazdjan and Borāzjān ; also known as Borāzjūn) is a city in the Central District of Dashtestan County, Bushehr province, Iran, serving as capital of both the county and the district.

== Demographics ==
=== Population ===
At the time of the 2006 National Census, the city's population was 92,221 in 20,300 households. The following census in 2011 counted 95,449 people in 23,914 households. The 2016 census measured the population of the city as 110,567 people in 31,261 households.

== The name of Borazjan in the inscription of Shapur Sakanshah ==
Persepolis is the most important architectural work of ancient Iran and is the greatest document of honor in the history of Iranians. In Tachara Palace, which is one of the palaces of Persepolis, there is an inscription of Shapur Sakanshah, the Sassanid prince.

Some scholars believe that the name "Borazjan" is mentioned in this inscription. Shapur Sakanshah, the son of Hormoz II, ruled Sistan (Sakastan) during the reign of Shapur II (309-379 AD); That is why he has been called Sakanshah. Centuries after the construction of Persepolis and during the Sassanid government, Shapur Sakanshah was on his way from the city of Istakhr near Persepolis to Sistan, where he visited this large and magnificent building.

On the occasion of this meeting, he ordered an inscription to be written on the wall of Thatcher Palace. In this copestone, which is in the Pahlavi language, Shapur Sakanshah names his companions after praising Yazdan and praising the Sasani king. Among other things, he mentions "Nersi priest of Varazan / Borazjan. Dr. Alireza Shapur Shahbazi, one of the experts in history Before Islam, Iran believed that the name of Borazjan was in the reading of this inscription.

Professor Richard Fry, a well-known American Iranologist, has read this part of Shapur Sakanshah's inscription as Nersi priest of "Varazgan". But it is mentioned there that Dr. Shapur Shahbazi considers this word as Borazjan as the equivalent of Varazgan.

== History ==
In ancient times, the town was actually by the Persian Gulf. However receding water has pushed the coastline 100 km south to where the city of Bushehr is today. This has left vast amounts of salt covered flats from Borazjan to Bushehr. The land is sparkling white. The salt crystals can be used to extract many minerals such as brine and sodium however such extraction does not exist. The surrounding landscape was greener in the past however over grazing and drier climate has killed off most of the vegetation. Many wild animals such as deer, boars and coyotes lived in the area, but they have since gone extinct.

The ruins around the city are over three hundred years old. A citadel that was constructed 250 years ago and served as a caravansarai for decades has been transformed into a prison in the last 70 years. Many jewels and treasures have been discovered around the city.

== Overview ==
Borazjan is the capital city of Dashtestan county, and is the largest city of the province. Approximately 70 km north of Bushehr, it was built based on the waters which flow from Giskan mountains into Dalaki river. Borazjan grew rapidly over the last two decades. The population of the town was 10,000 in 1980, 40,000 in 1990, 75,000 in 2000, and 124,291 in 2006. The two reasons for the growth have been an ever-increasing migration of villagers and nomads from the surrounding area to the city, and an explosive birth rate of 4%.

A large modern hospital serves the city and far away communities surrounding the city. The hospital has a helipad and a helicopter.

The city has one large fire department. It has several engines on standby for the city and beyond however it is rarely used. If the engines leave the station it quickly becomes the talk of town as to what happened.

The city has no airport. There has consistently been the talk of creating a small airport to serve the town. The nearest airport is in Bushehr about 70 km away. Research in 1992 showed that for every 100 passengers flying out of Bushehr for Tehran 35 were from Borazjan. This is not enough to create an airport but proponents attest that opening one up would encourage the growth of the town.

The main street of Borazjan is called Bimarestan Street. Bimarestan translates to Hospital in English. The hospital is located on this street. Many young people drive up and down this street in motor cycles in their free time.

Borazjan has a cemetery that serves the city and surrounding communities. It has many trees and no cremation facilities. Mourners and other visitors often come to the cemetery on Fridays.

Borazjan used to be home to a large Jewish population and locals believe that some Israeli officials are originally from this city.

The climate is dry and hot, and main products are dates, flour and tobacco.

== Economy ==
The main economy of the city is food processing from the nearby fields. The largest silo in all of southern Iran is in Borazjan. It was built with Russian aid and completed in 1971. It houses grain shipped there from the surrounding farms. The cultivation of dates and the processing and packaging of dates is a very important industry. About half of the dates are shipped north to consumers in the rest of the country and half are shipped to Bushehr to be exported to other countries.

The nearby farms are almost all privately owned. They average only several acres in size each. A handful of people own very large pieces of land and use modern machinery to maximize its potential. Farm workers and day labourers are a common sight in these areas.

Products grown around the city in order of popularity (not monetary value per se) are wheat, dates, sesame seeds, watermelons, and tomatoes.

There are two major flouring mill factories in Borazjan: Al-Zahra and Borazjan flouring mills.

Other industry near or around the city consists of furniture making, metal working, small scale manufacturing, and textiles.

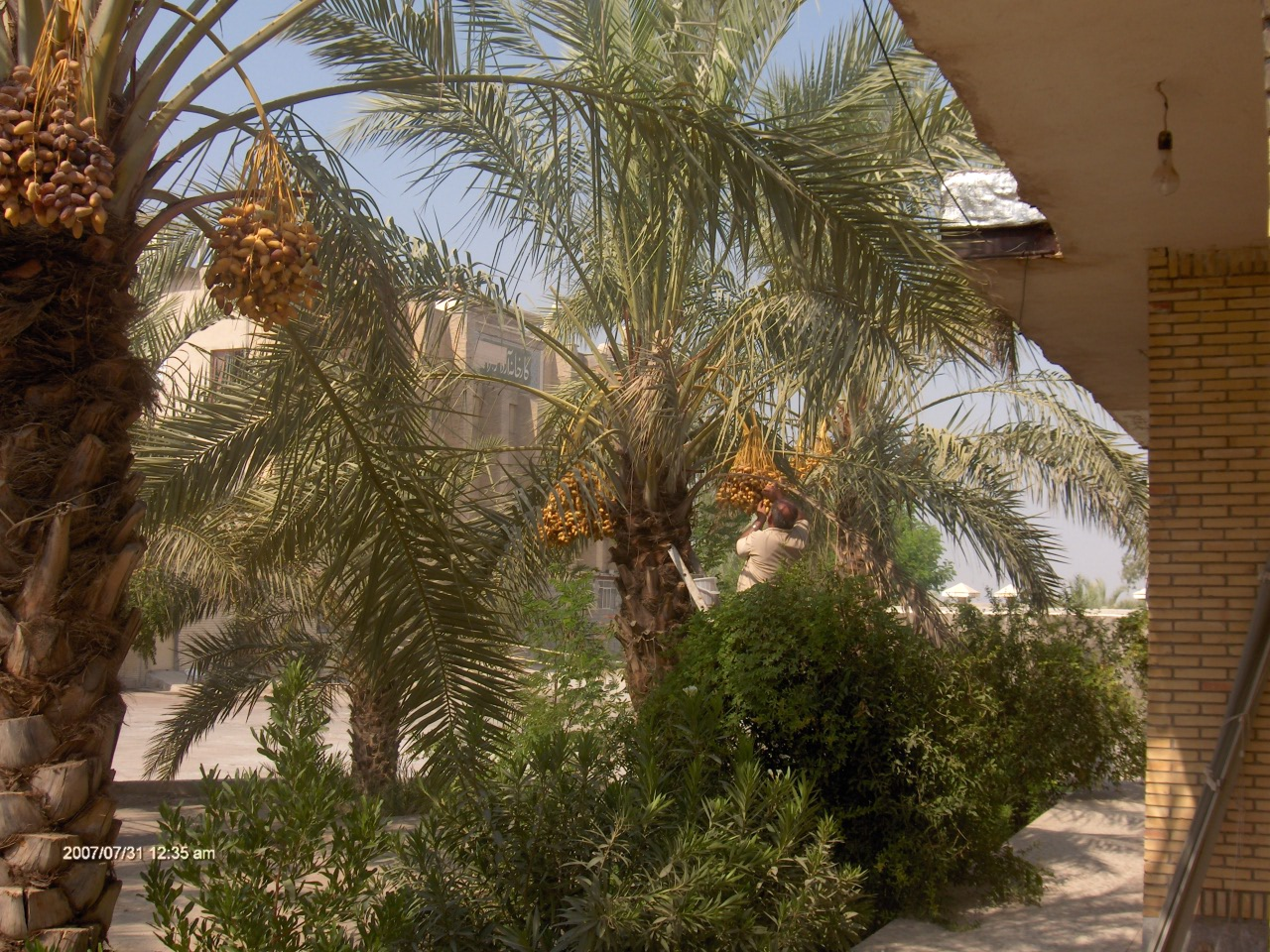
A man picking dates in Borazjan area

== See also ==
- Temukan
