= Sahebgharaniyeh Palace =

Royal palace in Tehran, Iran

Coordinates: 35°48′38″N 51°28′19″E

Saheb-Gharaniyeh Palace
- کاخ صاحبقرانیه
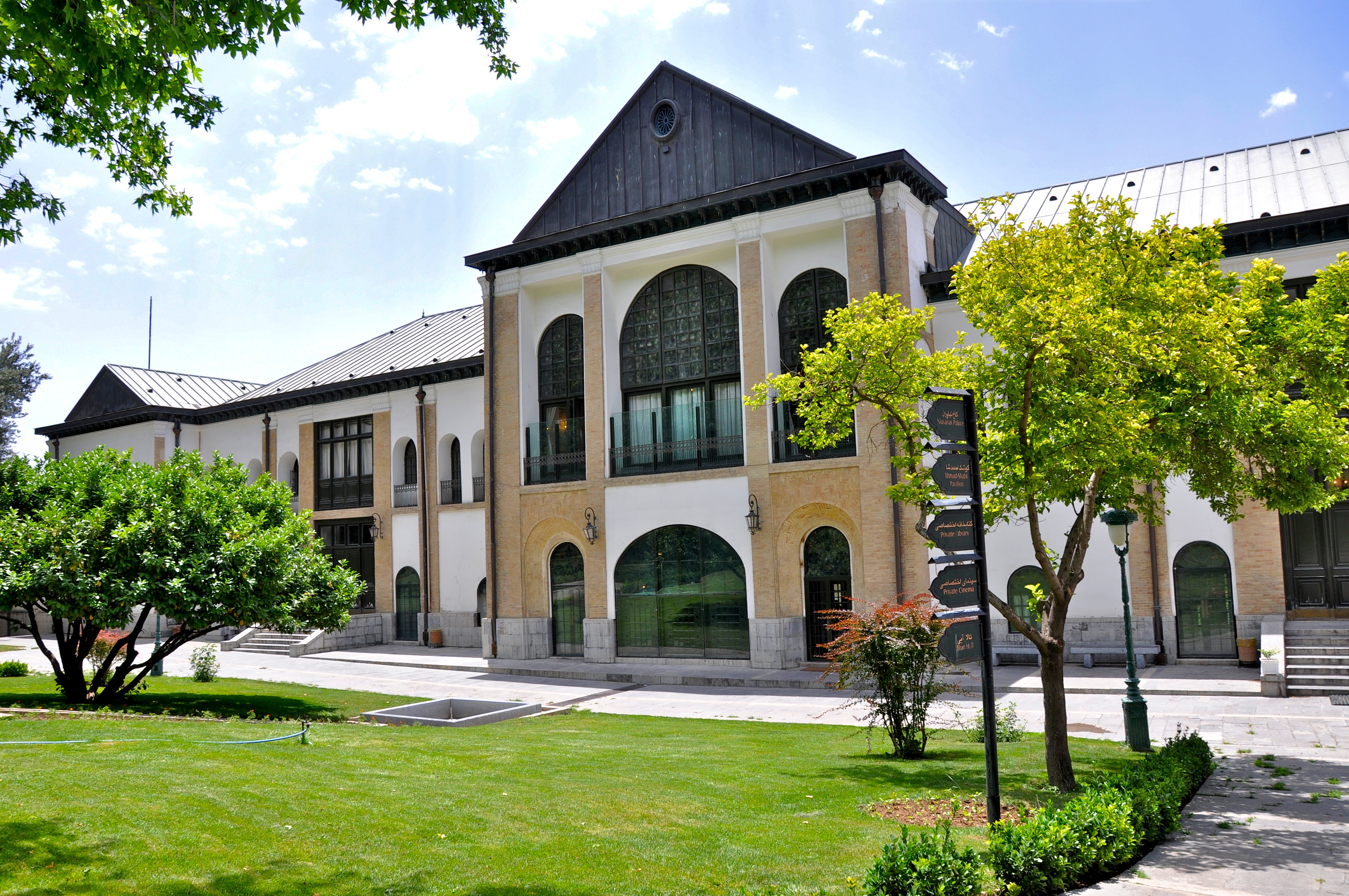
- Alternative names: Jahan Nama Palace

General information
- Architectural style: Qajar style

Iran National Heritage List
- Official name: Saheb-Gharaniyeh Palace
- Type: Palace]
- Designated: 1956
- Reference no.: 419
- Conservation organization: Cultural Heritage, Handicrafts and Tourism Organization of Iran
- Location: Tehran, Iran

The Sahebgharaniyeh Palace (Persian: کاخ صاحبقرانیه) is a royal palace in Tehran, Iran. Built in 1850 by the order of Naser ed-Din Shah Qajar, it is one of the only Qajar buildings in the Niavaran complex.

== History ==
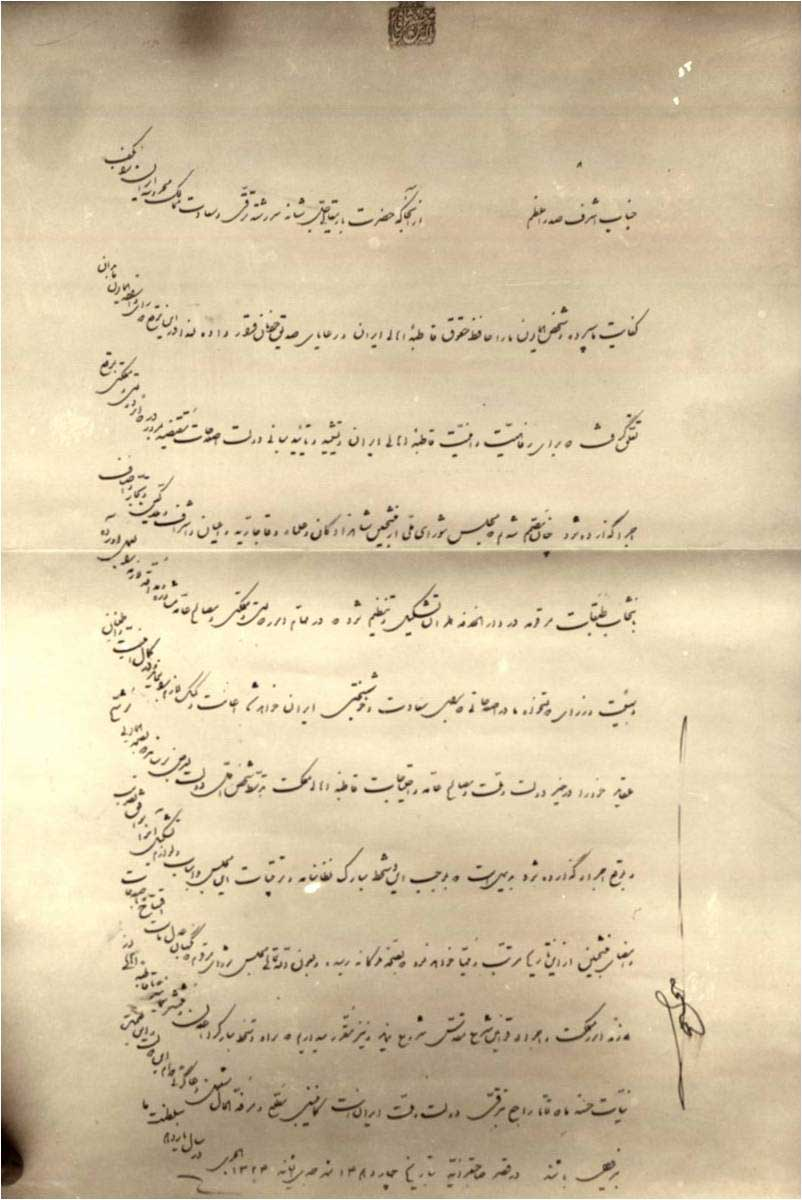
Mozaffar ad-Din Shah Qajar's 1906 firman proclaiming the constitutional monarchy, signed "in Sahebgharaniyeh Palace on 14 jumada al-thani 1324 hijri in the eleventh year of our reign".

Naser ed-Din Shah Qajar ordered the construction of the palace in 1850 in two floors, and in the 39th year of his rule he gave himself the title Sahebgharan and gave the name "Sahebgharaniyeh" to the place. On 28 May 1901, Mozaffar ad-Din Shah Qajar signed the D'Arcy Concession here. Later, on 5 August 1906, he also issued the firman proclaiming the constitutional monarchy in this palace.

The palace sits adjacent to Niavaran garden.

During the Pahlavi era, Fawzia of Egypt and Mohammad Reza Pahlavi were scheduled to hold their wedding in this palace. This was cancelled due to cold weather. The palace was also used as the working office of the Shah for several years before the 1979 Iranian revolution.

Parts of Bitter Coffee and Kamalolmolk were filmed here.

== Gallery ==
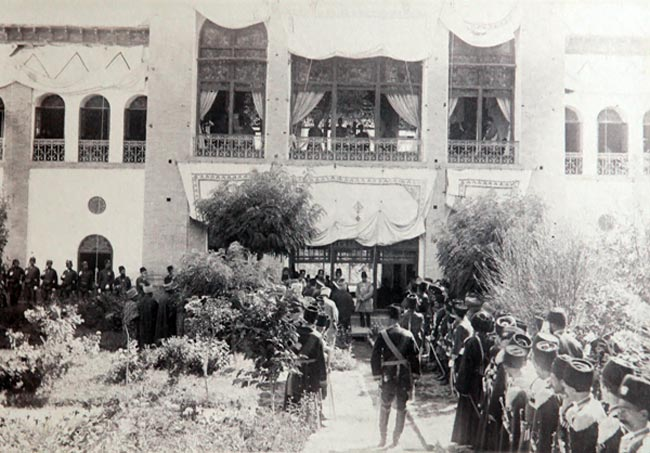
New year greeting of Naser ed-Din Shah Qajar

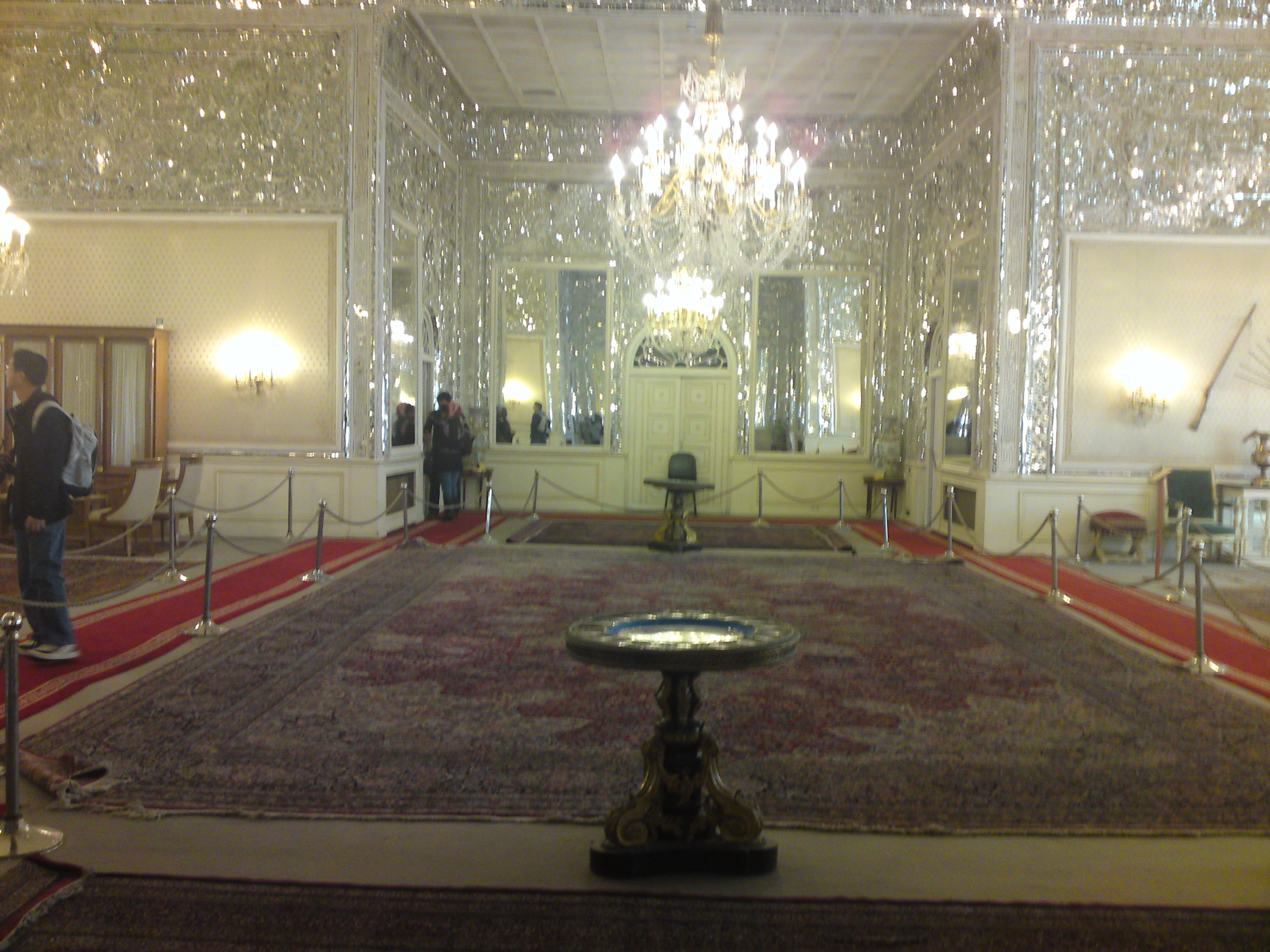
Jahan nama Hall, featuring Ayeneh-kari decoration

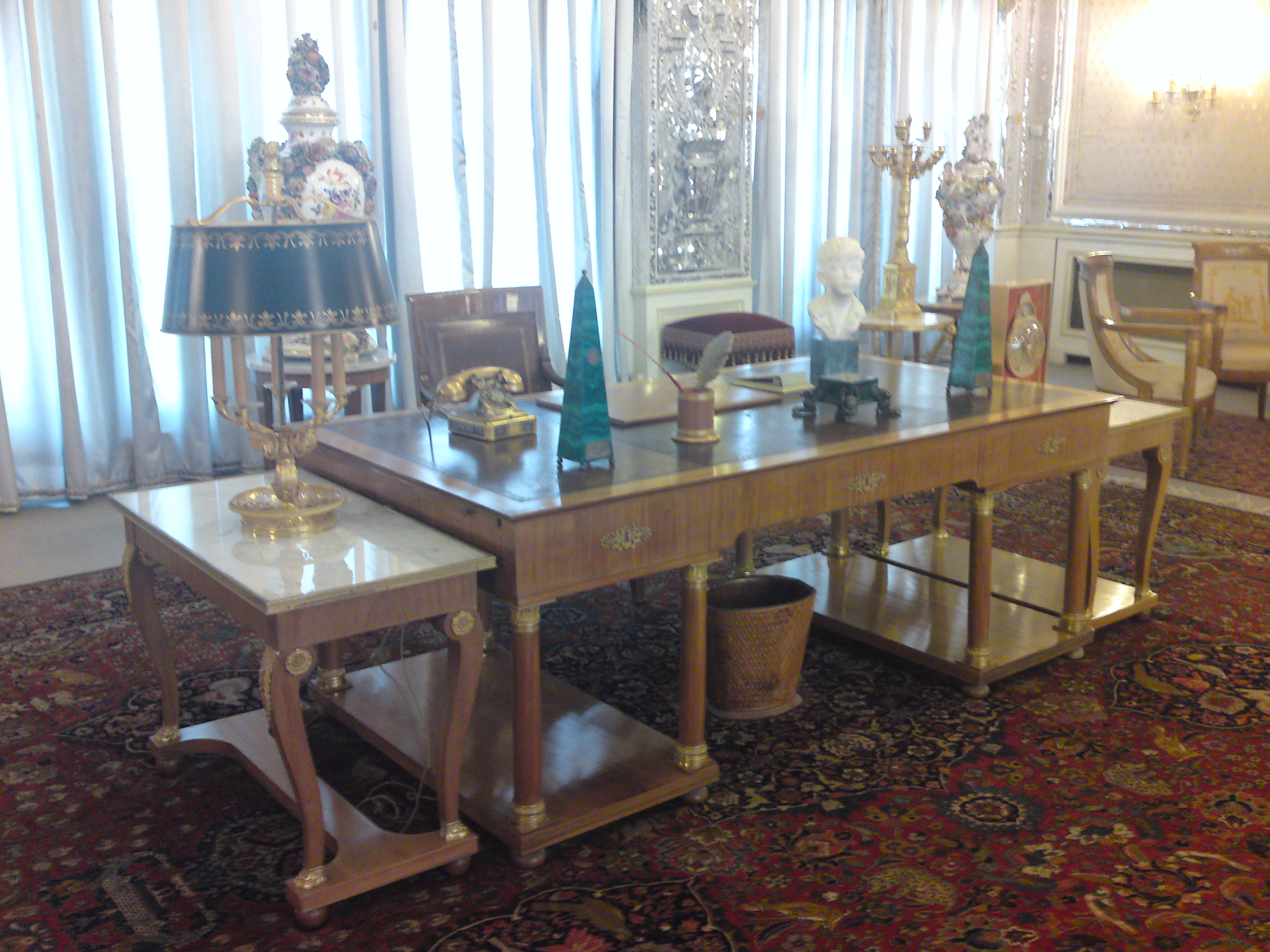
Work table of Mohammad Reza Shah Pahlavi

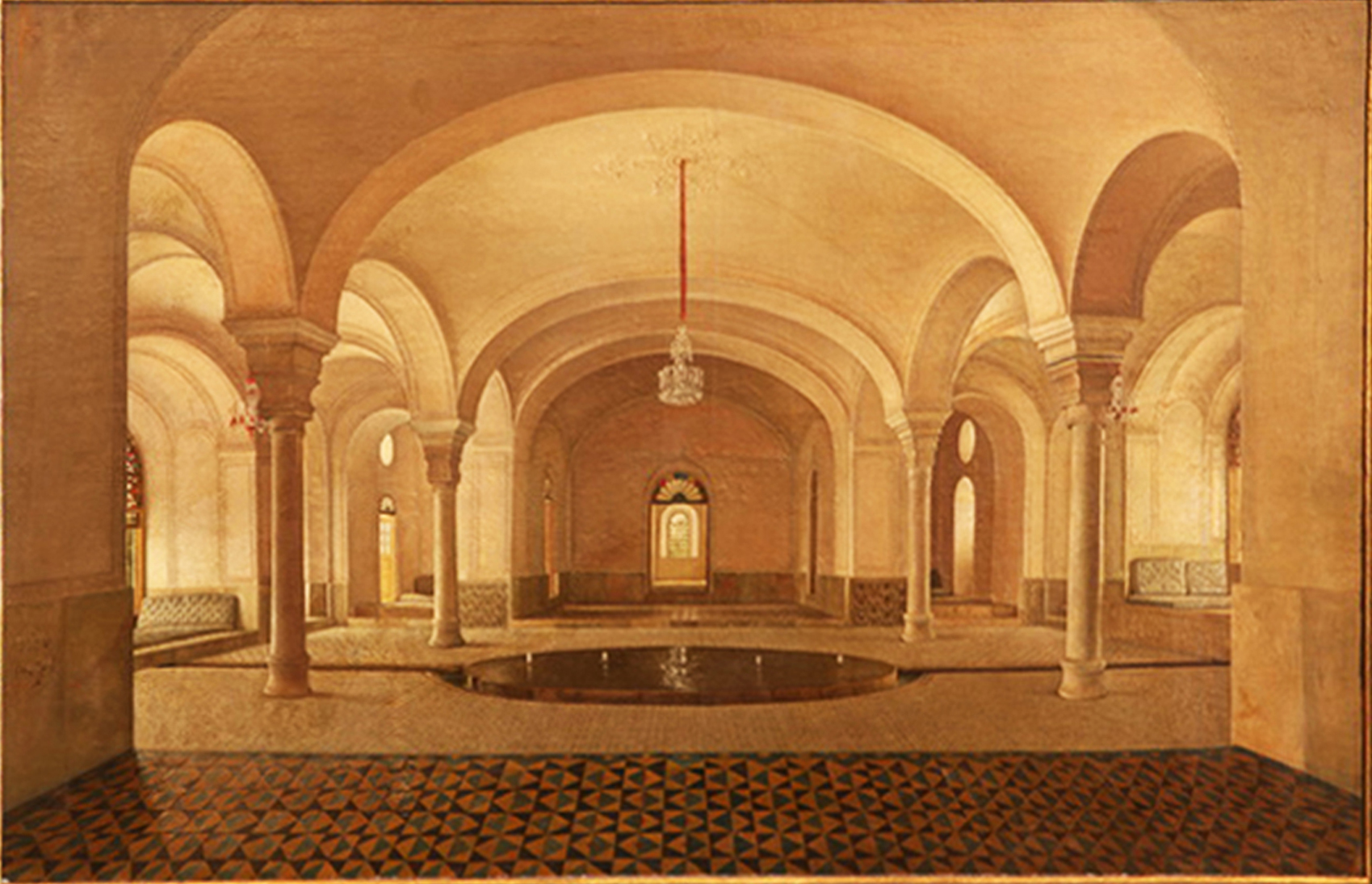
Hoz Khaneh by Kamal-ol-molk

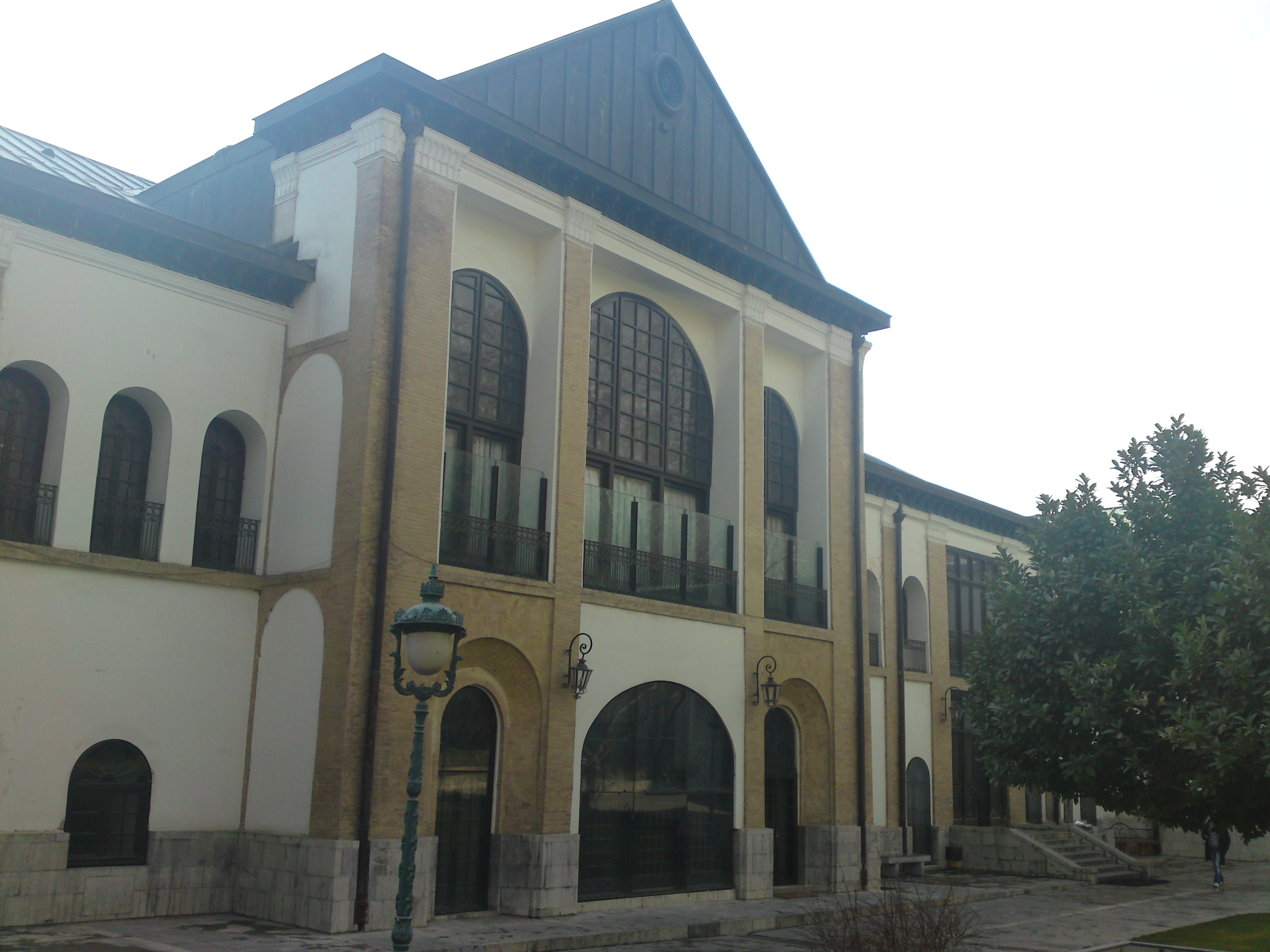
A view of the palace

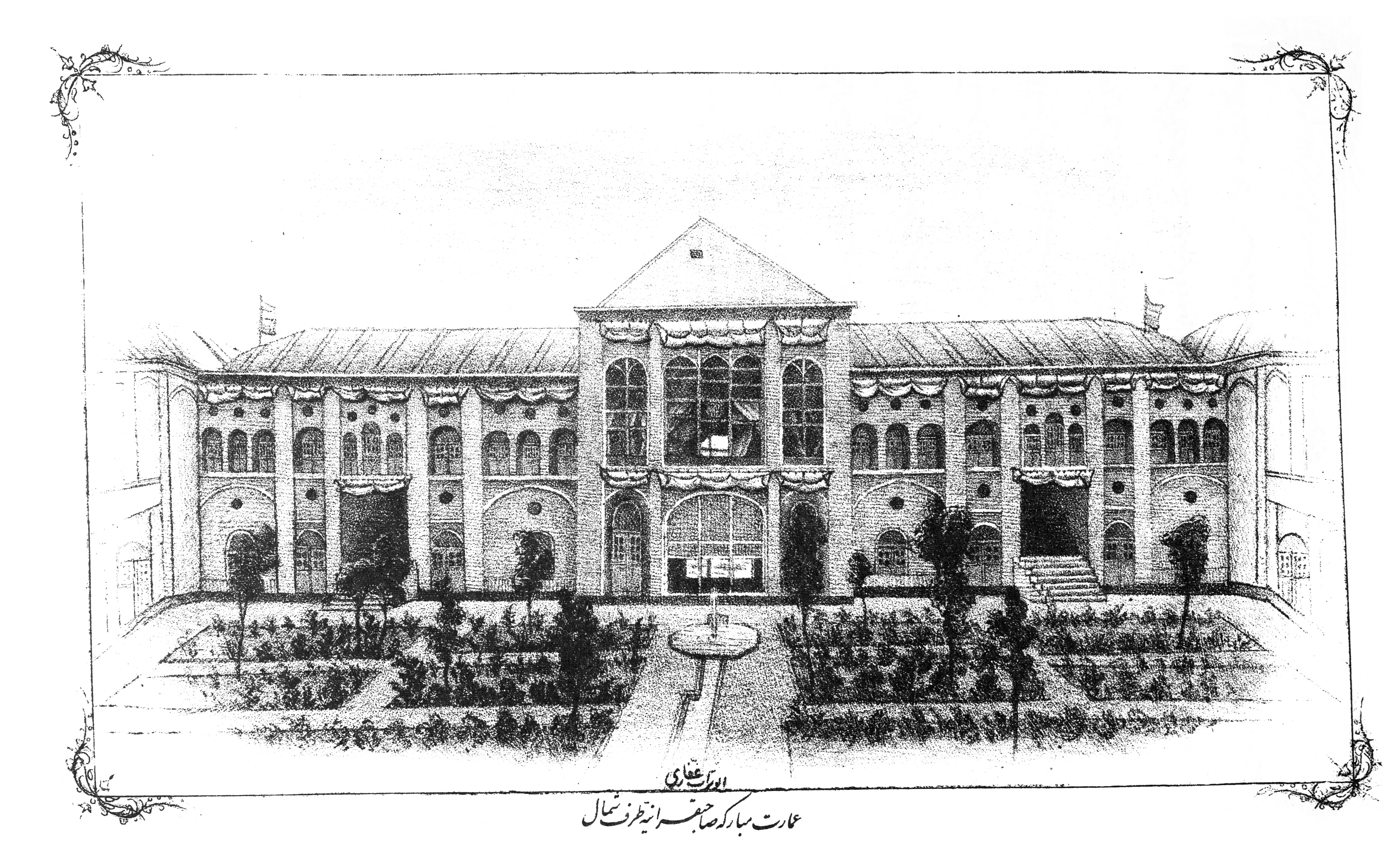
Sahebqaraanieh building, 1884

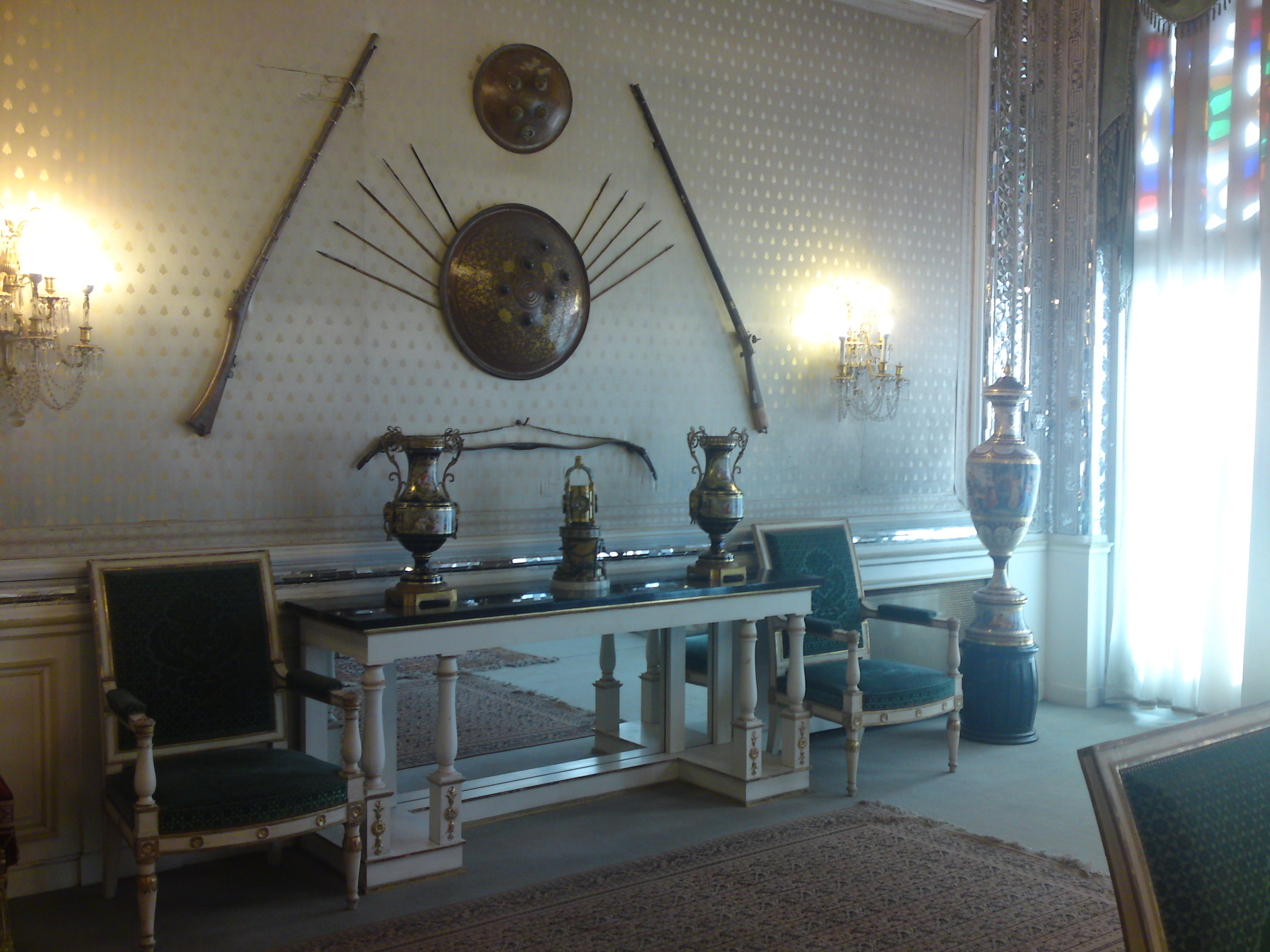
Jahan nama Hall Decorations

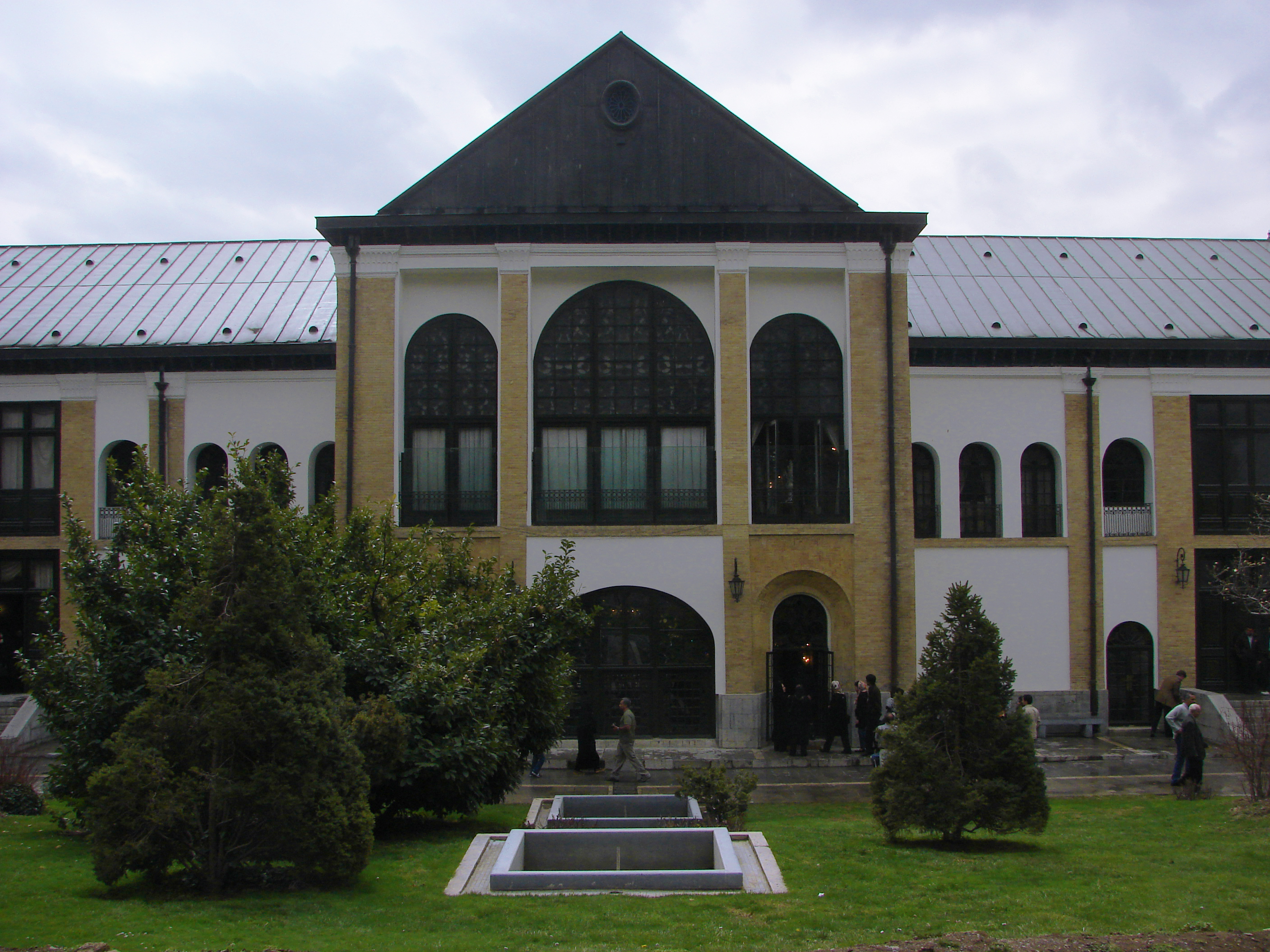
A view of the palace

== See also ==
- Ahmad Shahi Pavilion
- Niavaran Palace
- Niavaran Complex
