= Niavaran Complex =

Compound of Iranian palaces and historic site

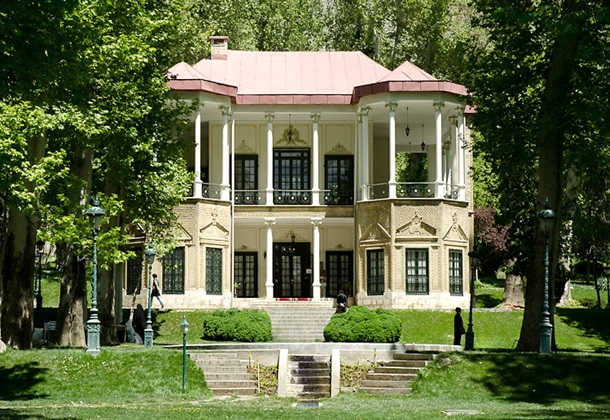
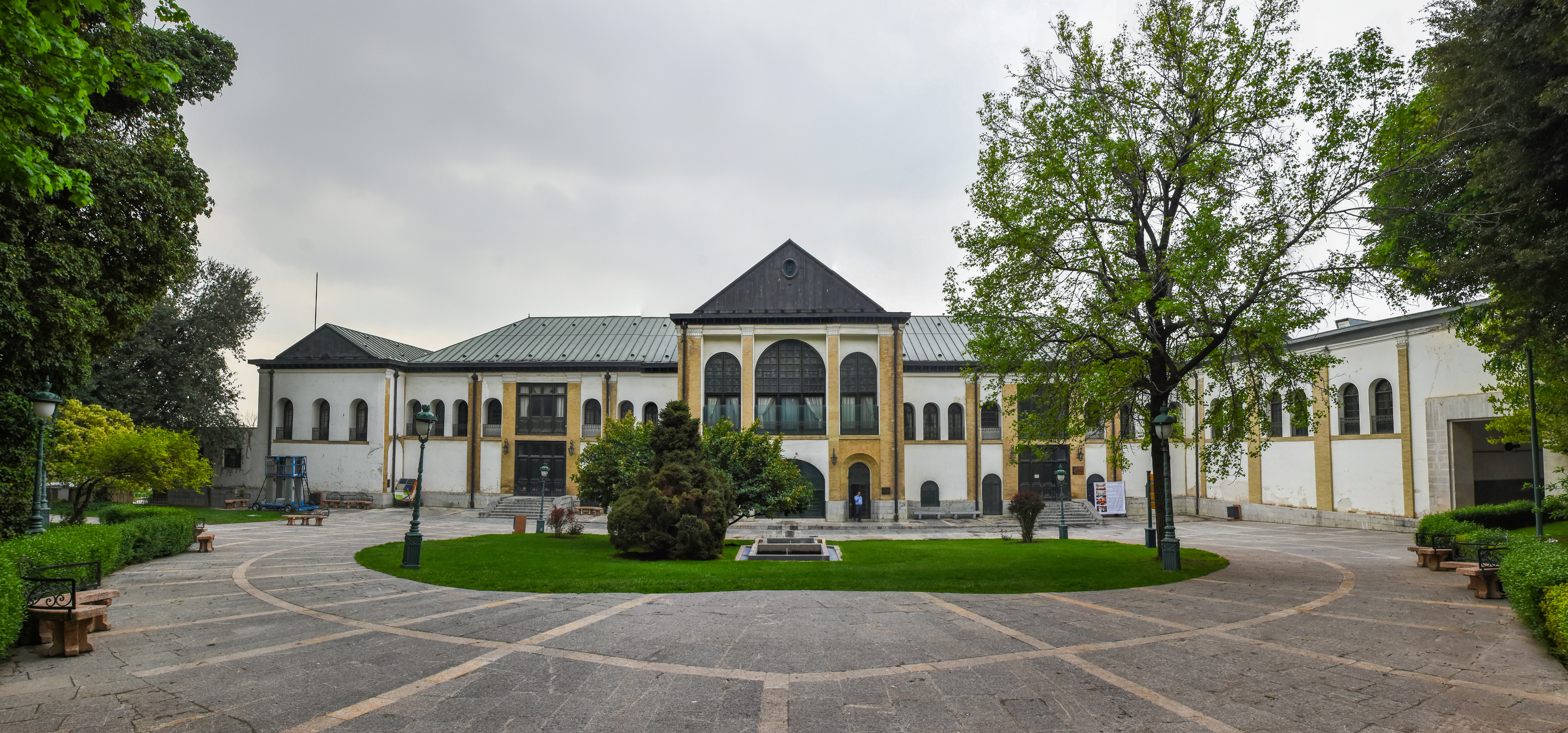
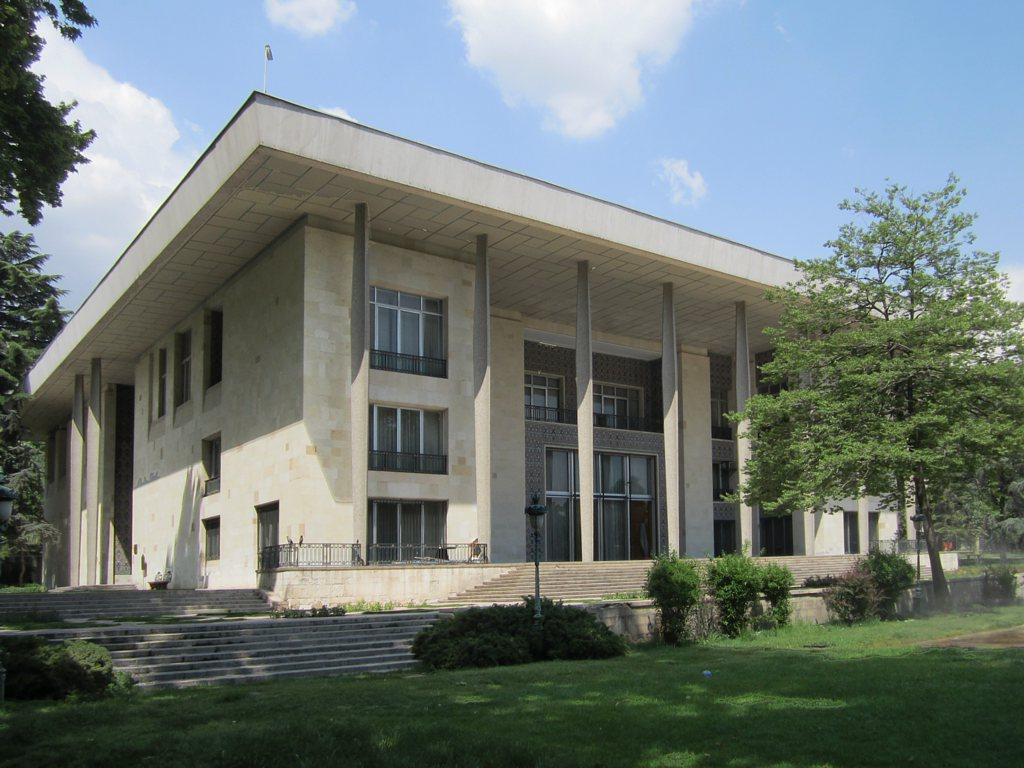
- Ahmad Shahi Pavilion, Sahebgharaniyeh Palace, and Niavaran Palace
- Interactive map of Niavaran Complex
- 35.8120°N 51.4725°E
- Type: Palace museum, memorial
- Location: Shemiran (northern Tehran), Iran

History
- Built: 1967 (59 years ago)

Site notes
- Restored by: Mohammad Reza Nikbakht
- Governing body: Cultural Heritage Organization of Iran
- Website: https://www.niavaranmu.ir

The Niavaran Palace Complex (Persian: مجموعه کاخ نیاوران, romanized: Majmue-ye Kākh-e Niāvarān) is a historic palace complex situated in Shemiran (northern Tehran), Iran. It consists of several palace buildings and monuments dating back to the Qajar and Pahlavi eras.

== History ==
In the early 19th century, Fath-Ali Shah ordered a summer residence to be built in Tehran's countryside. In 1850, the Sahebgharaniyeh Palace was built by the order of Naser al-Din Shah. In the 1910s, the Ahmad Shahi Pavilion was built as Ahmad Shah's residence.

During the reign of Reza Shah, all of the peripheral buildings of the Sahebgharaniyeh Palace, with the exception of the Ahmad Shahi Pavilion, were demolished, and the present-day structures were built to the north of the Sahebgharaniyeh. The Ahmad Shahi Pavilion was then used as an exhibition centre for presents from world leaders to the Iranian shahs.

During the reign of Mohammad Reza Shah, a new palace named Niavaran was constructed for the imperial family. The palace was designed in 1958 and completed in 1967. It served a variety of purposes for the court including as a home for the Shah and Shahbanu Farah as well as a place to entertain visiting foreign heads of state. On 31 December 1977, the reception and state banquet for U.S. president Jimmy Carter took place here.

The complex consists of three structures: Niavaran Palace, Ahmad Shahi Pavilion, and the Sahebgharaniyeh Palace. The buildings were built during various time periods ranging from Qajar Iran to Pahlavi Iran. Currently, the complex is a museum that showcases imperial artifacts. The interiors remain in their original 1979 state.

The Shah and Shahbanu left basically everything behind when they left Iran in January 1979.

== Palaces ==
Name	Image	Year of completion	Resident
Niavaran Palace		1967; 59 years ago	Mohammad Reza Pahlavi
Ahmad Shahi Pavilion		c. 1910s	Ahmad Shah Qajar
Sahebgharaniyeh Palace		1850; 176 years ago	Naser al-Din Shah Qajar

== Gallery ==
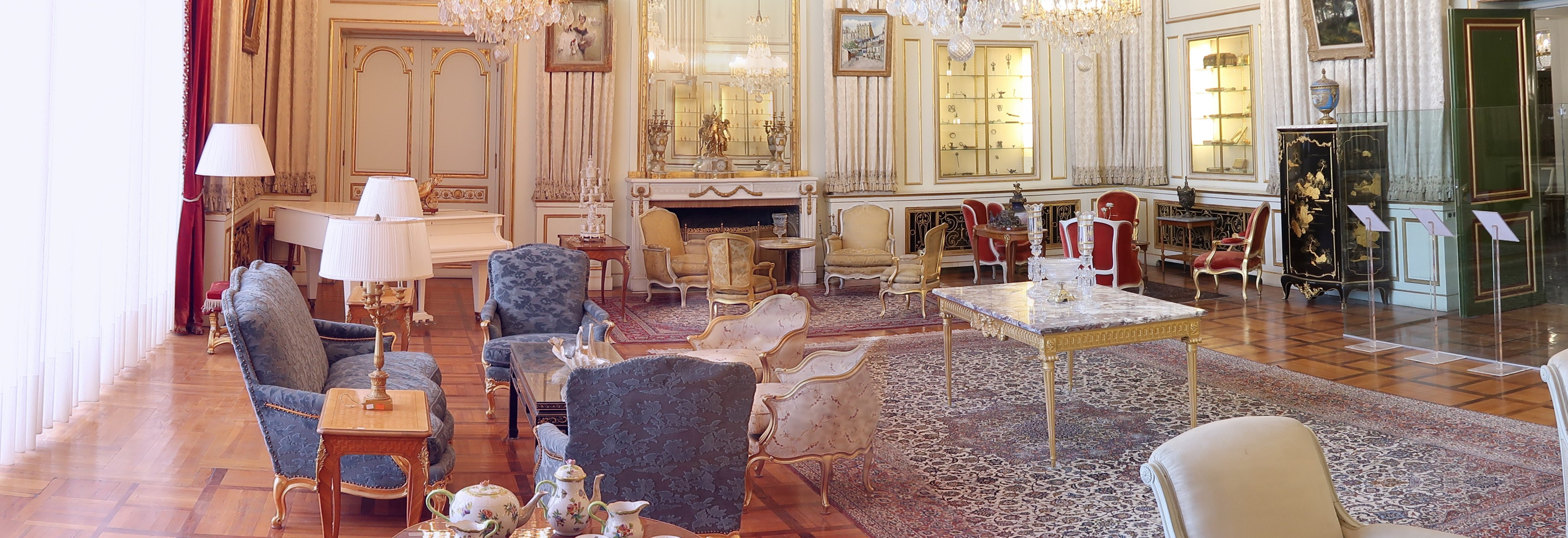
Sitting room inside the Niavaran Mansion
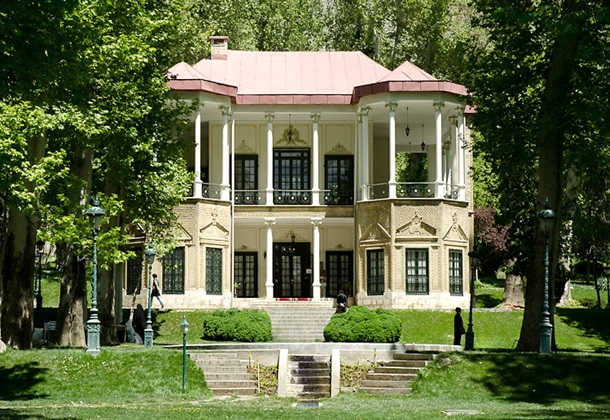
Ahmad Shahi Pavilion

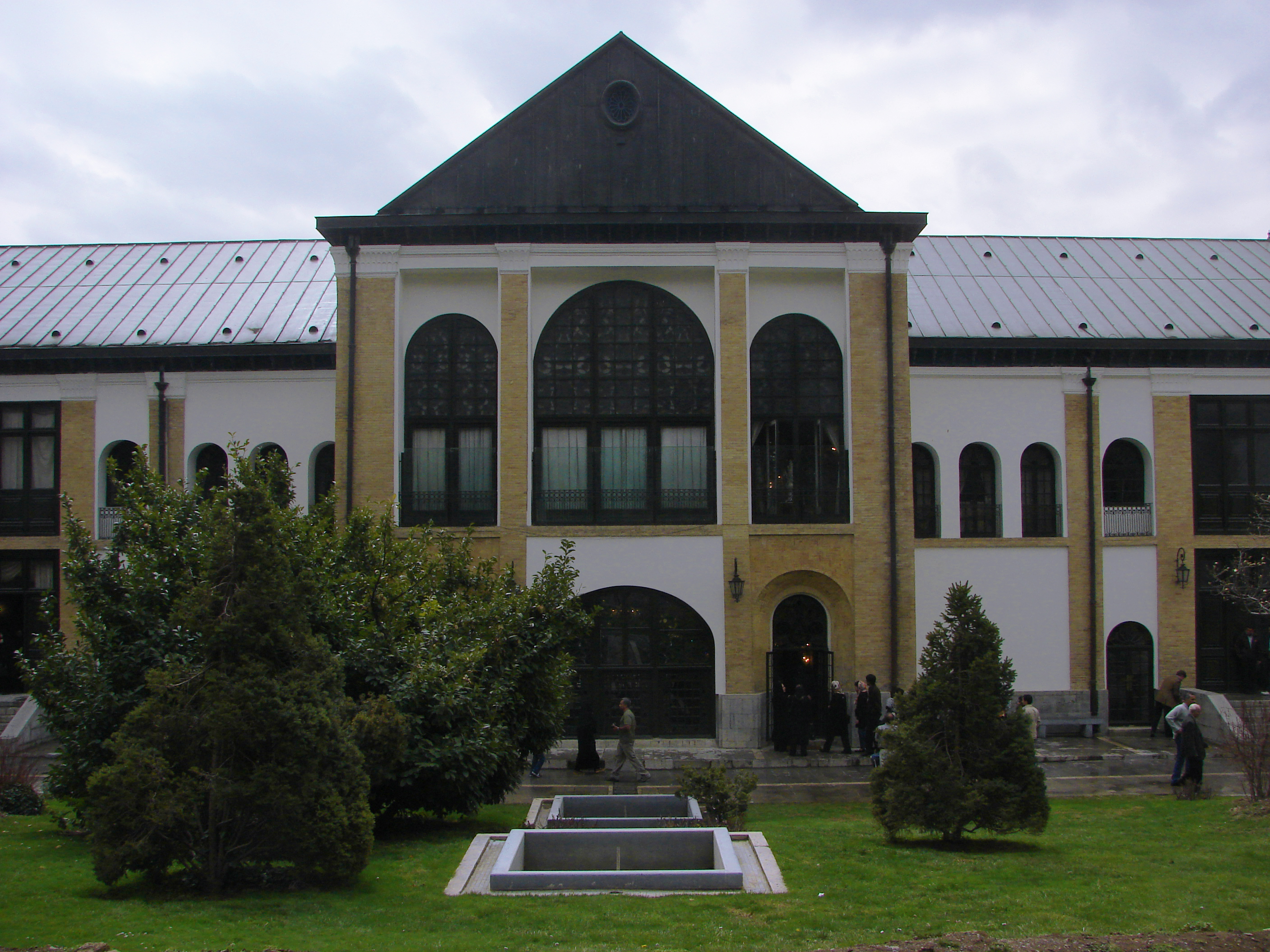
Sahebgharaniyeh Palace

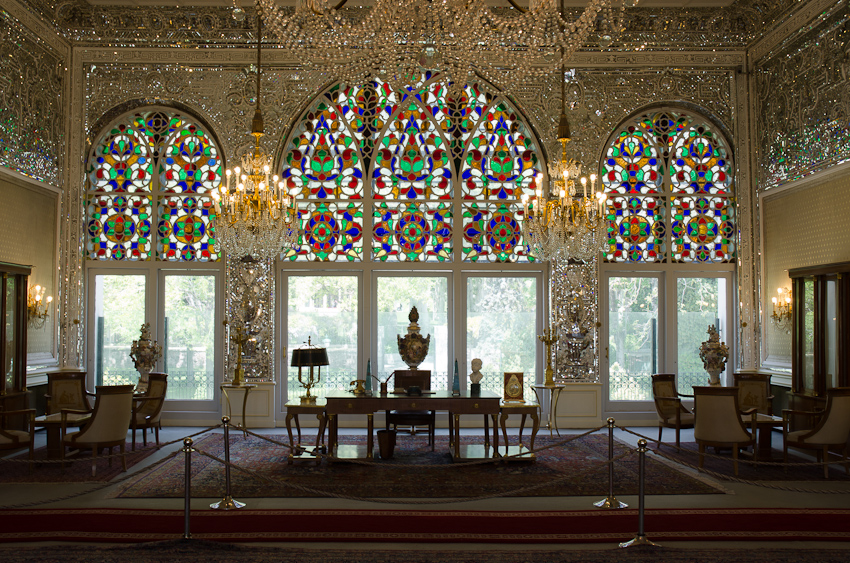
The office of the Shah within the Sahebgharaniyeh Palace

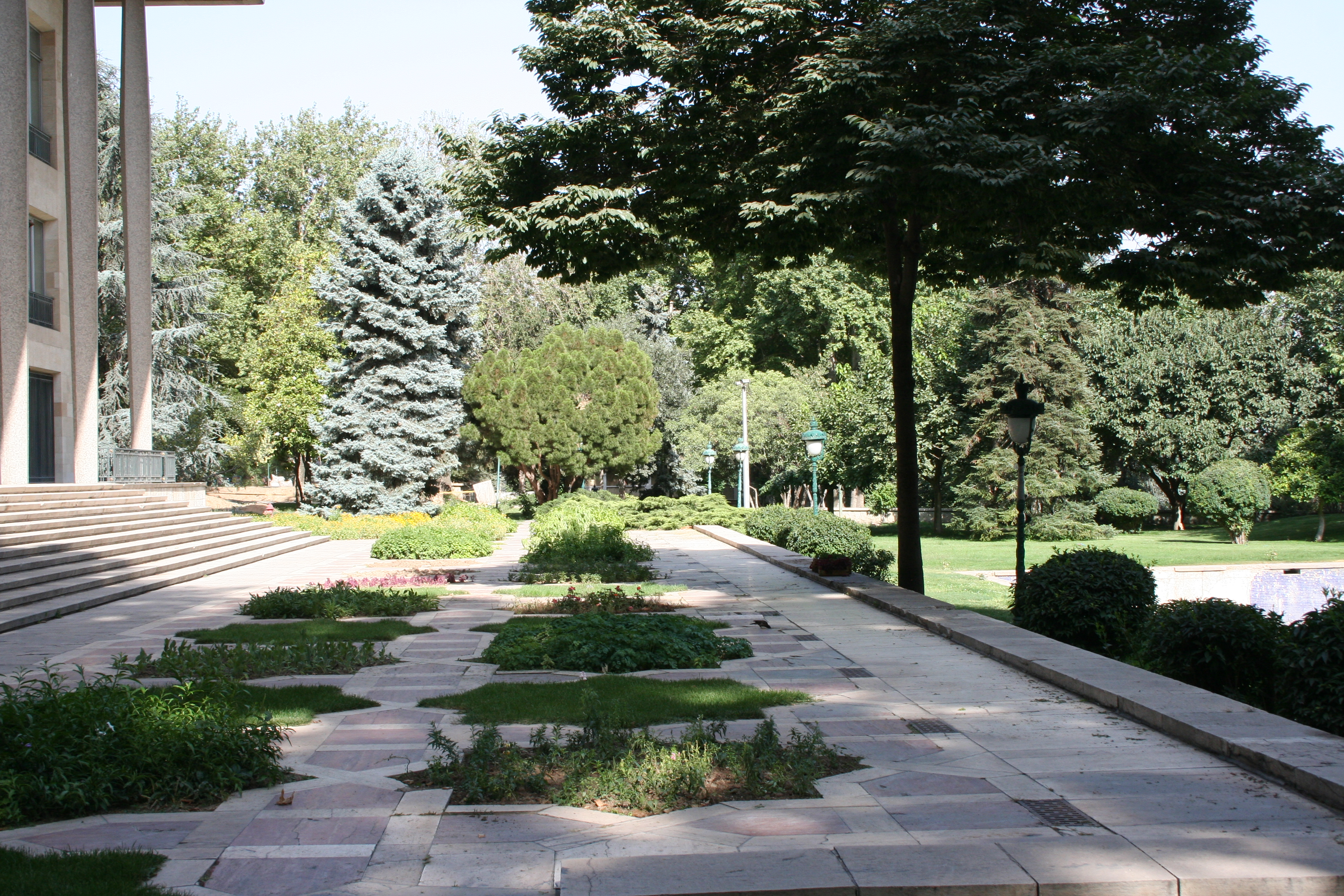
Area in front of the Niavaran Mansion

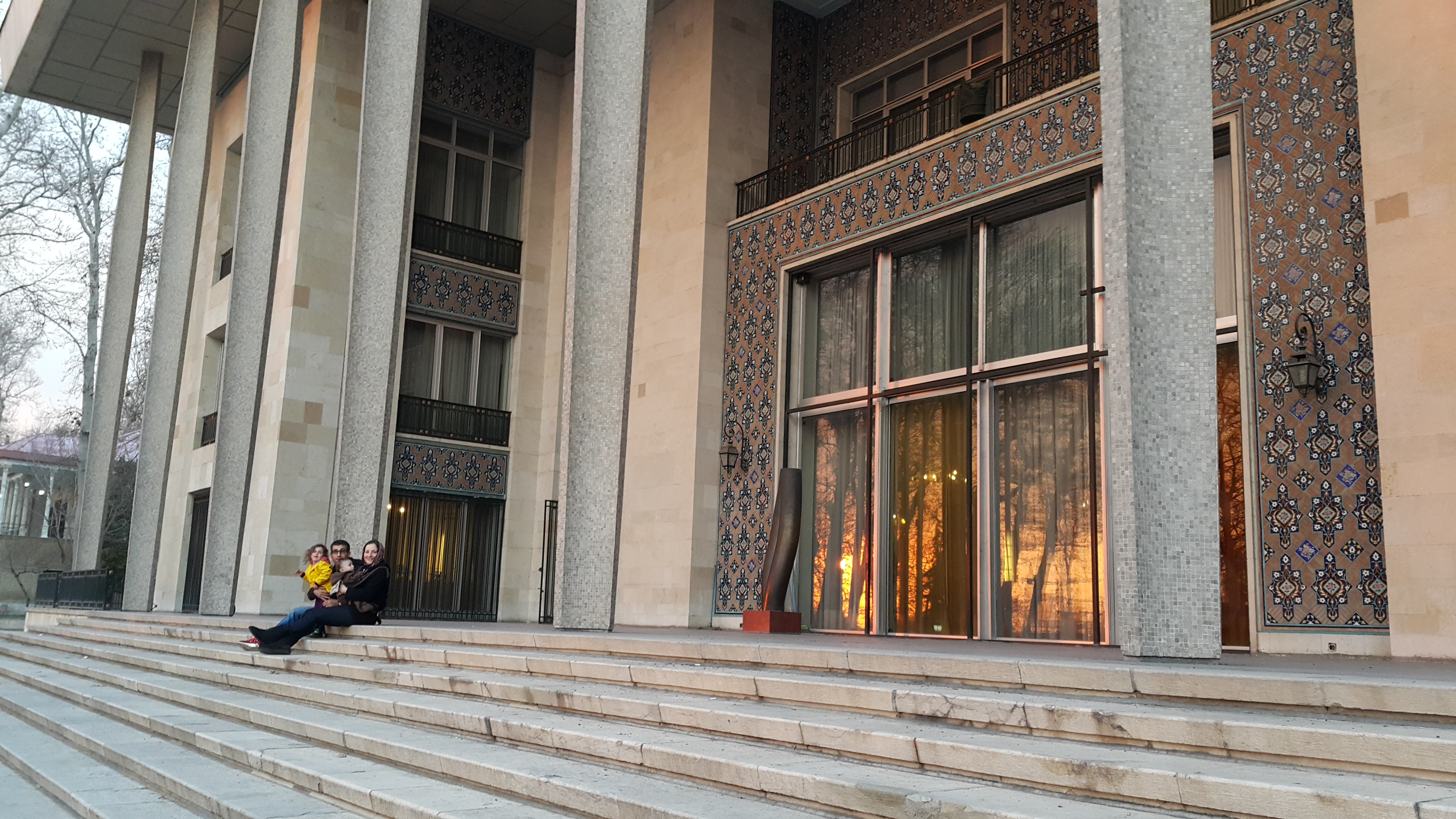
The gate of the Niavaran Mansion

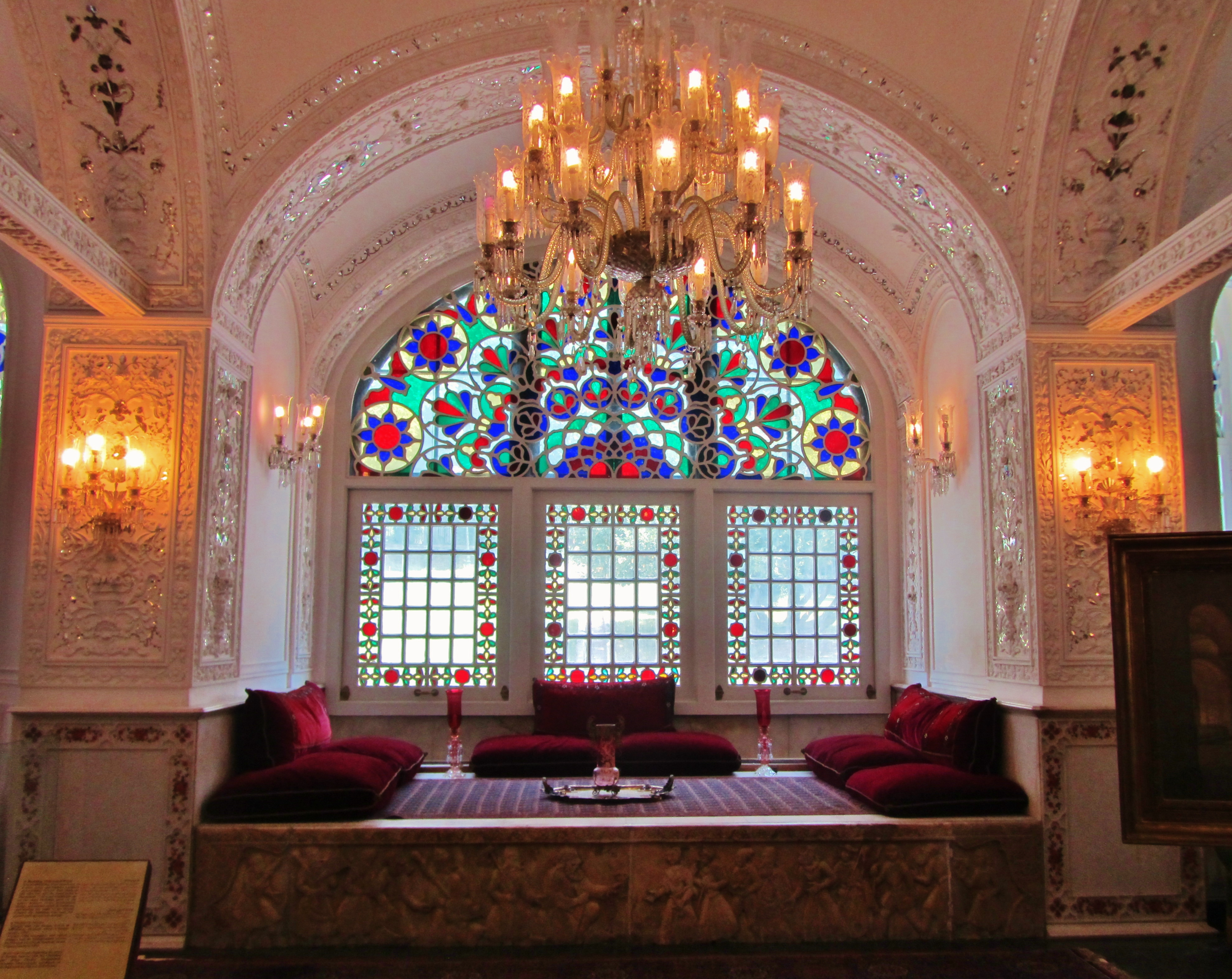
Inside the Niavaran Mansion

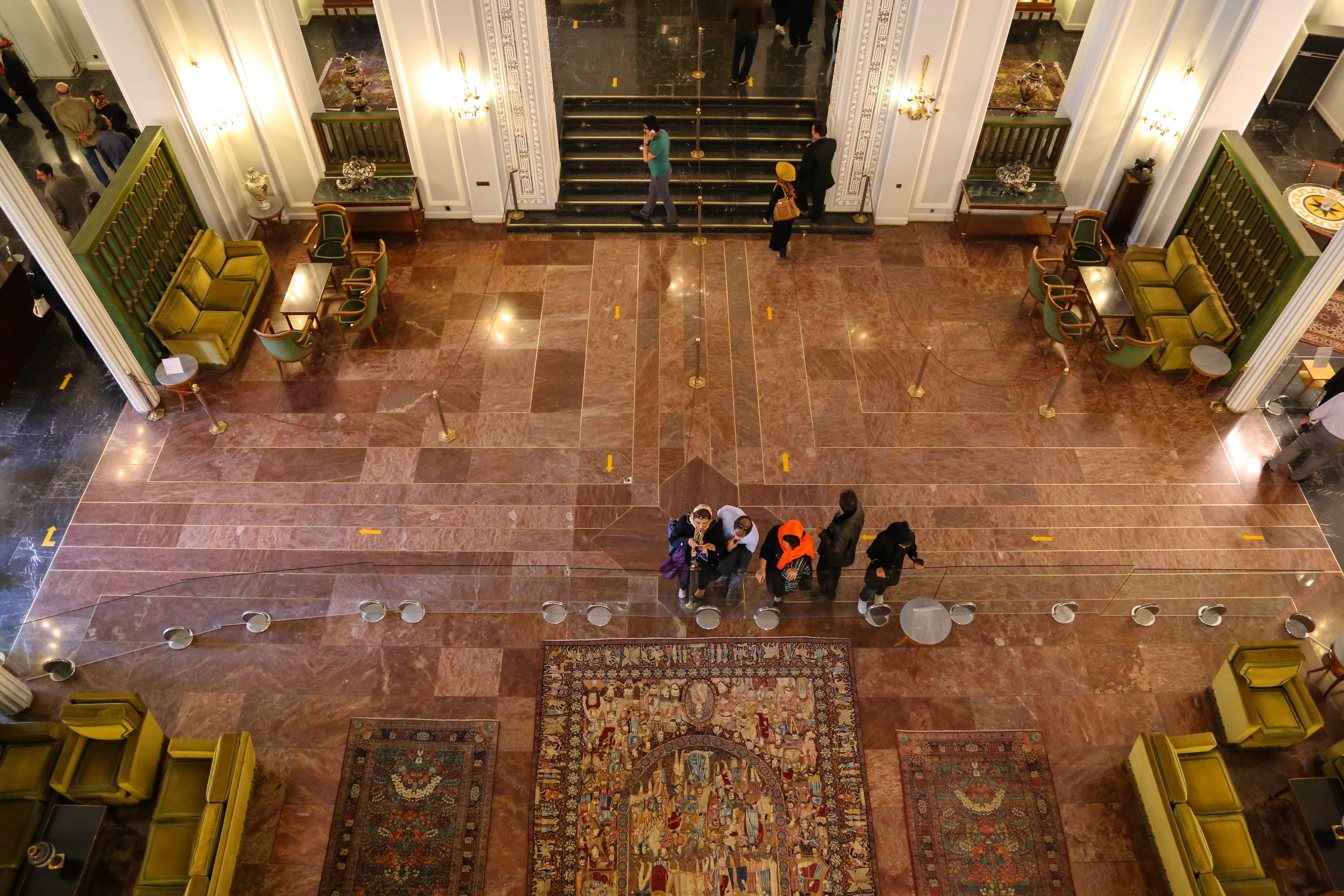
Inside the Niavaran Mansion

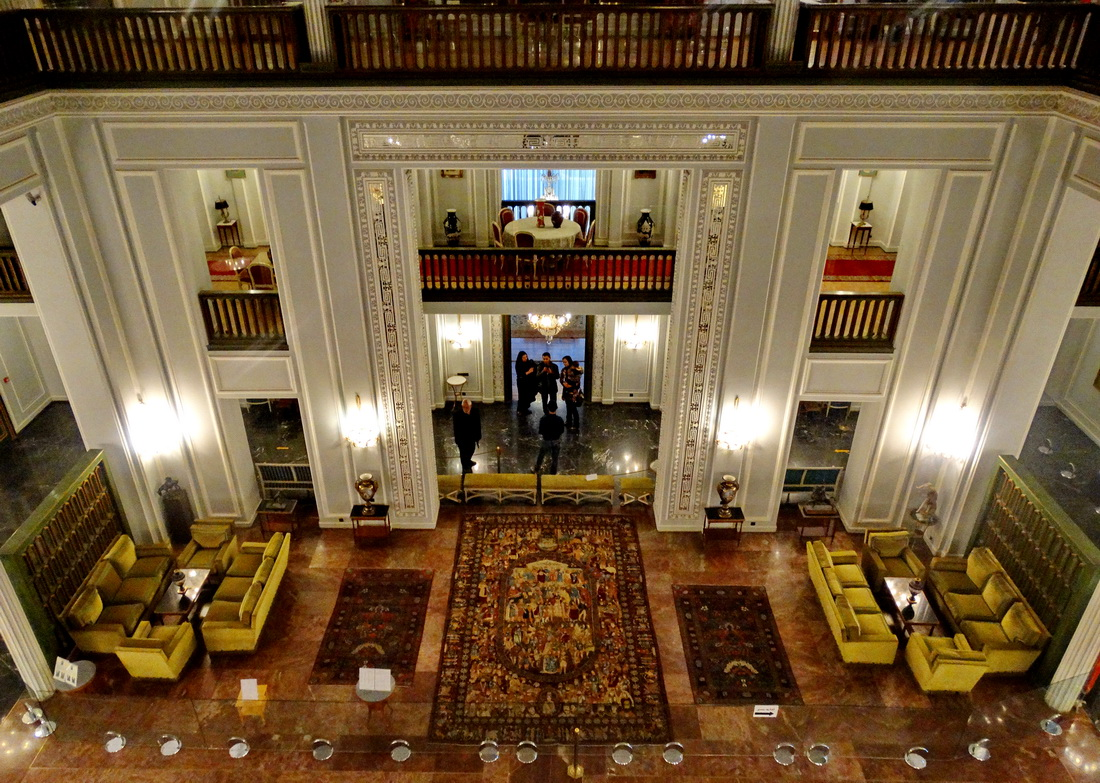
Inside the Niavaran Mansion

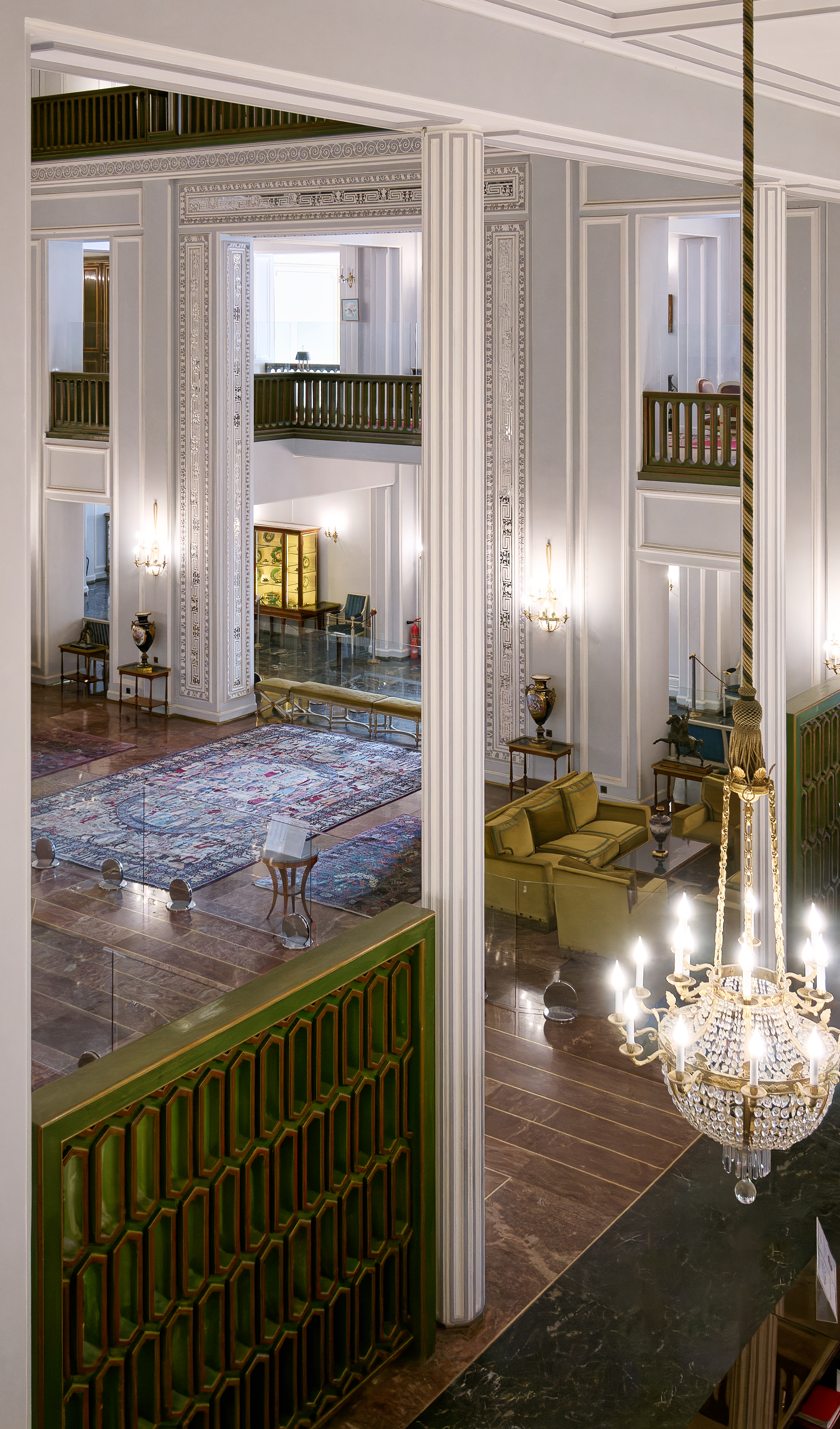
Inside the Niavaran Mansion

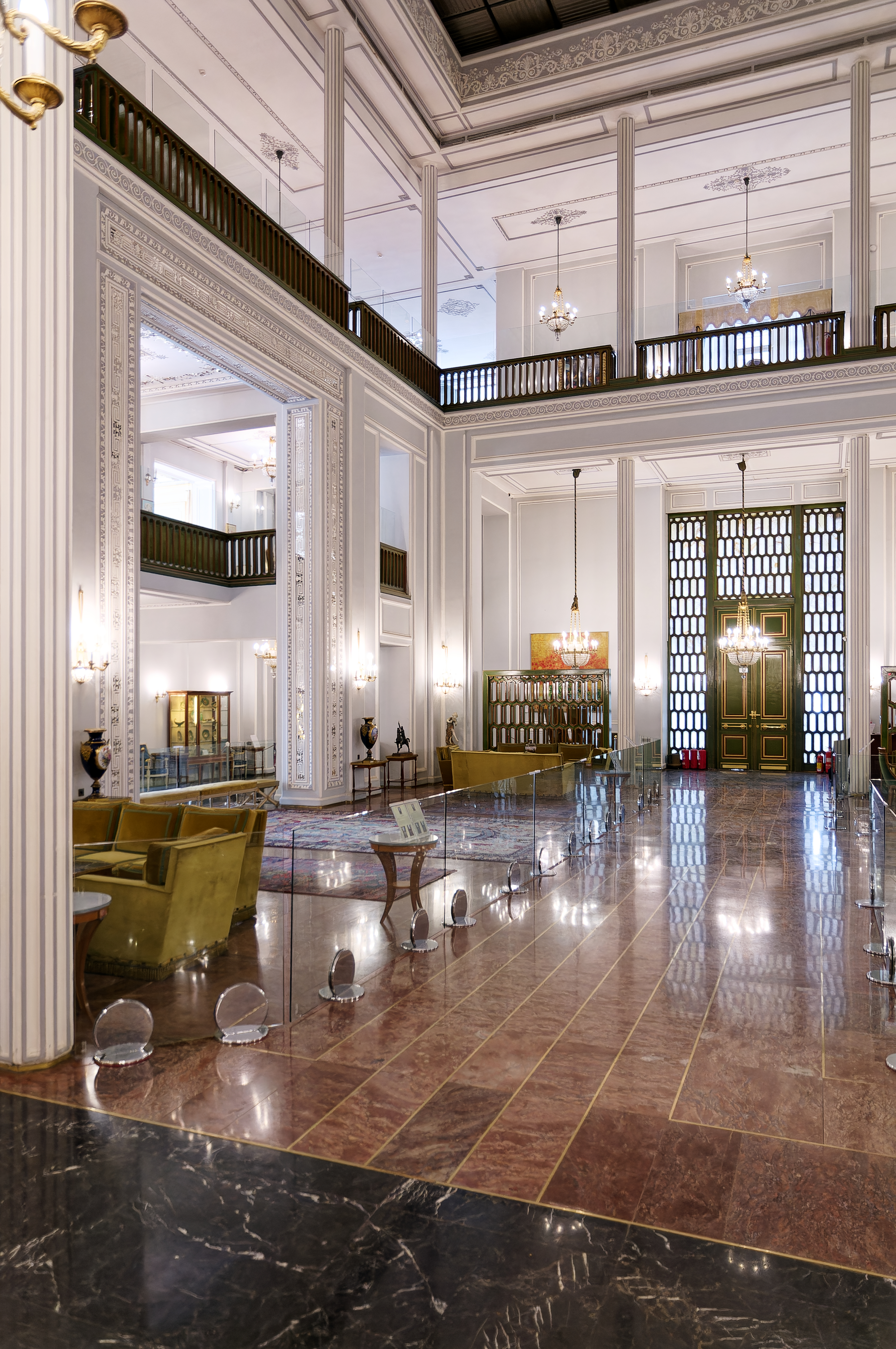
Inside the Niavaran Mansion

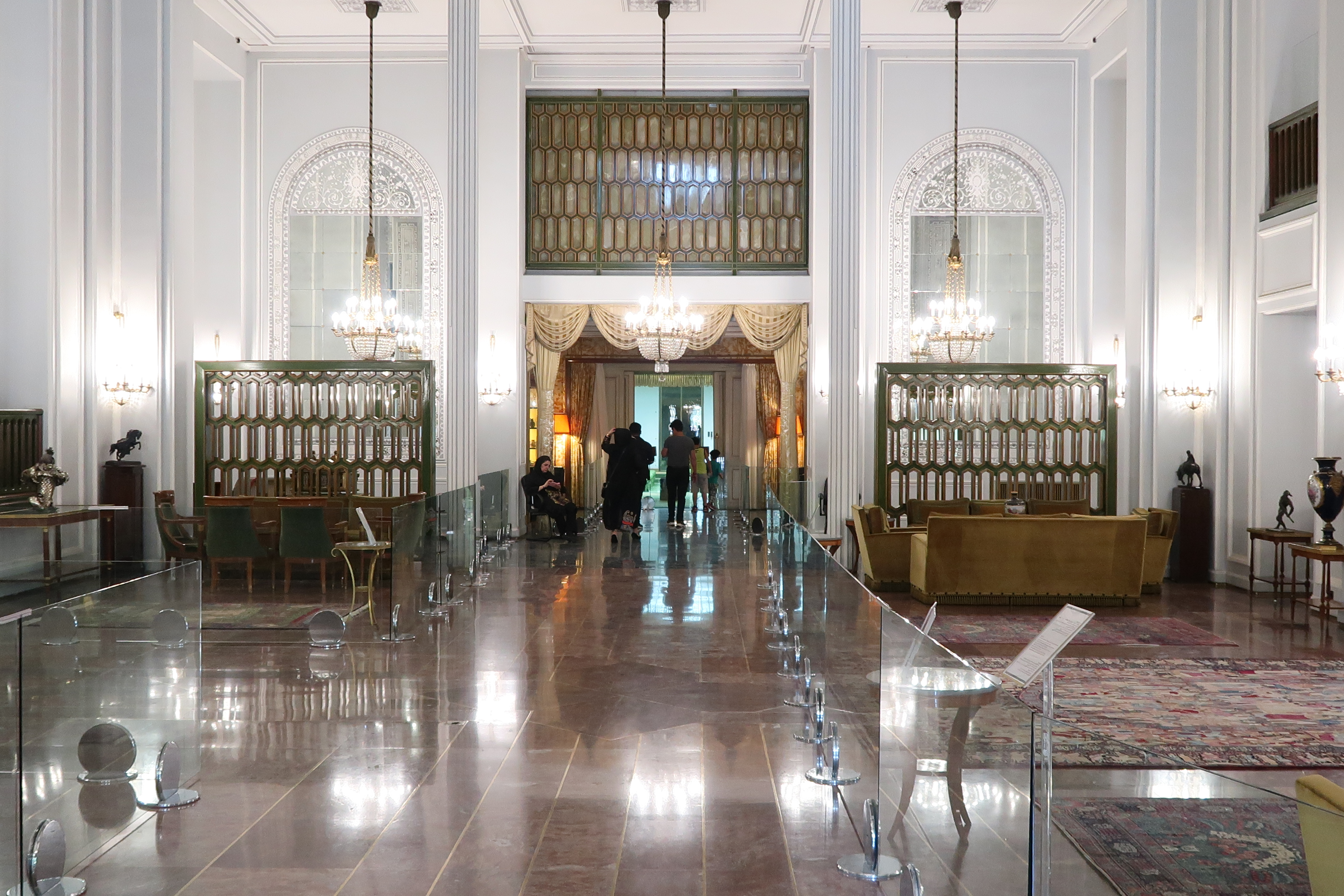
Inside the Niavaran Mansion

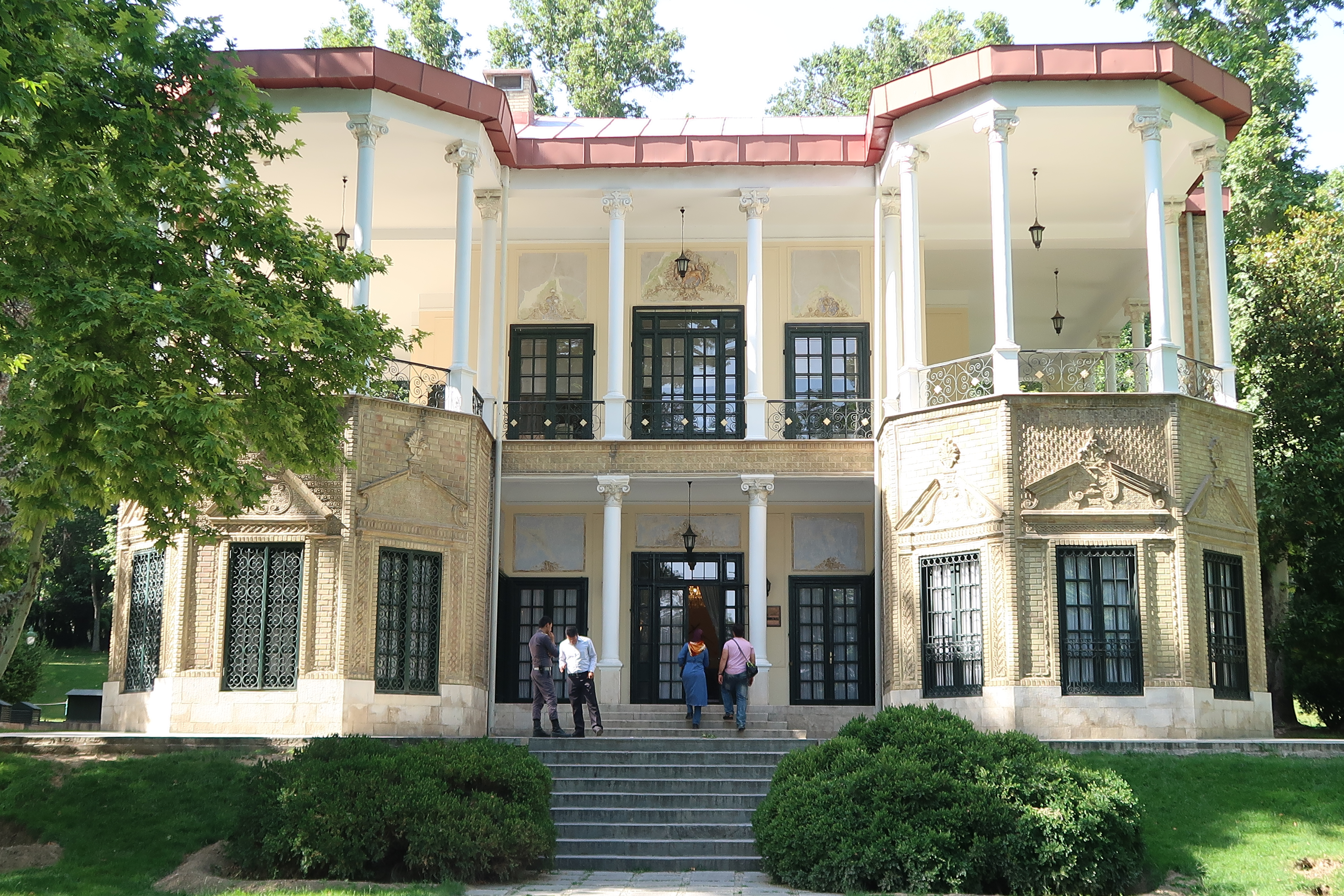
Ahmad Shahi Pavilion

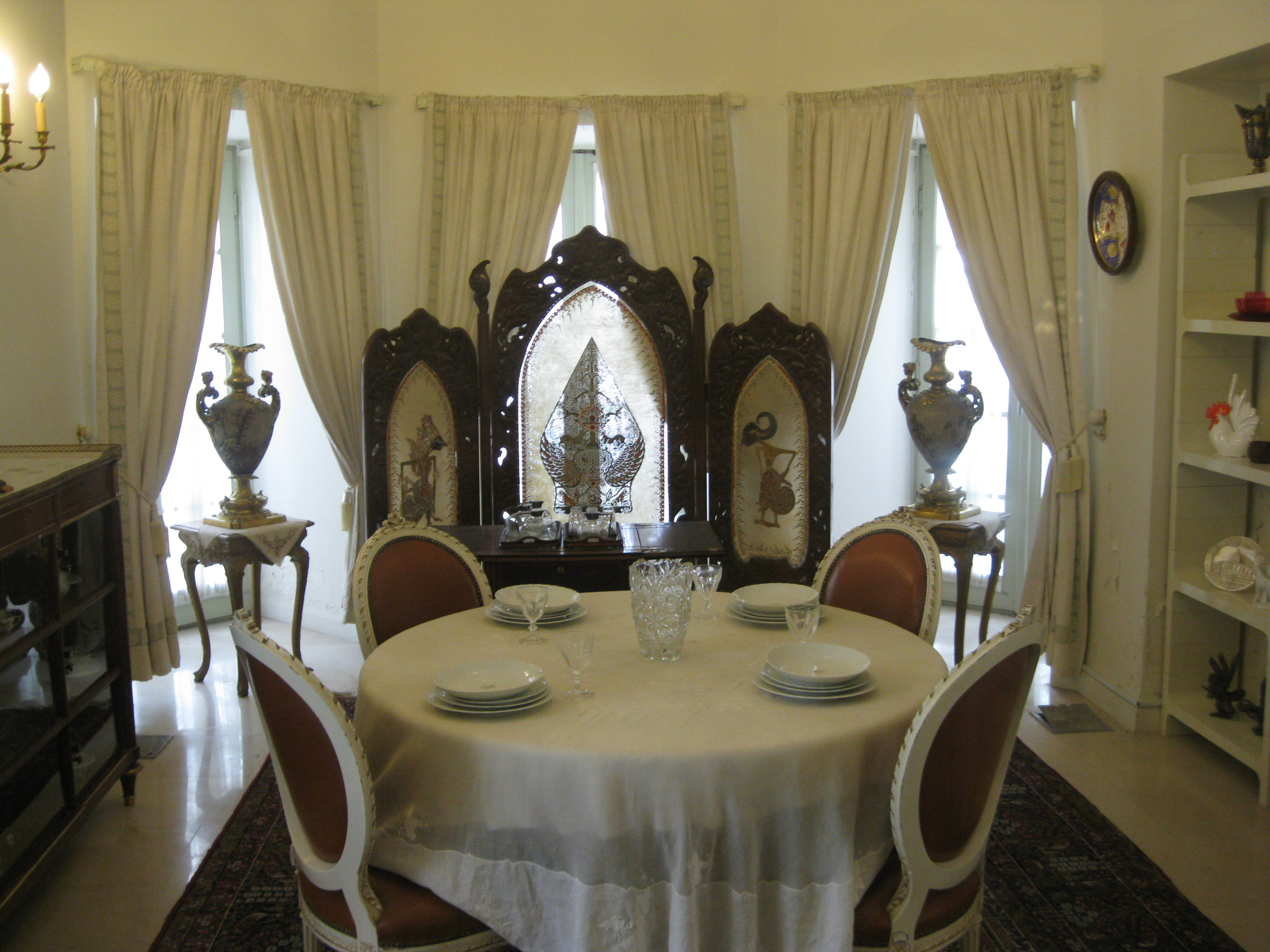
Inside the Ahmad Shahi Pavilion

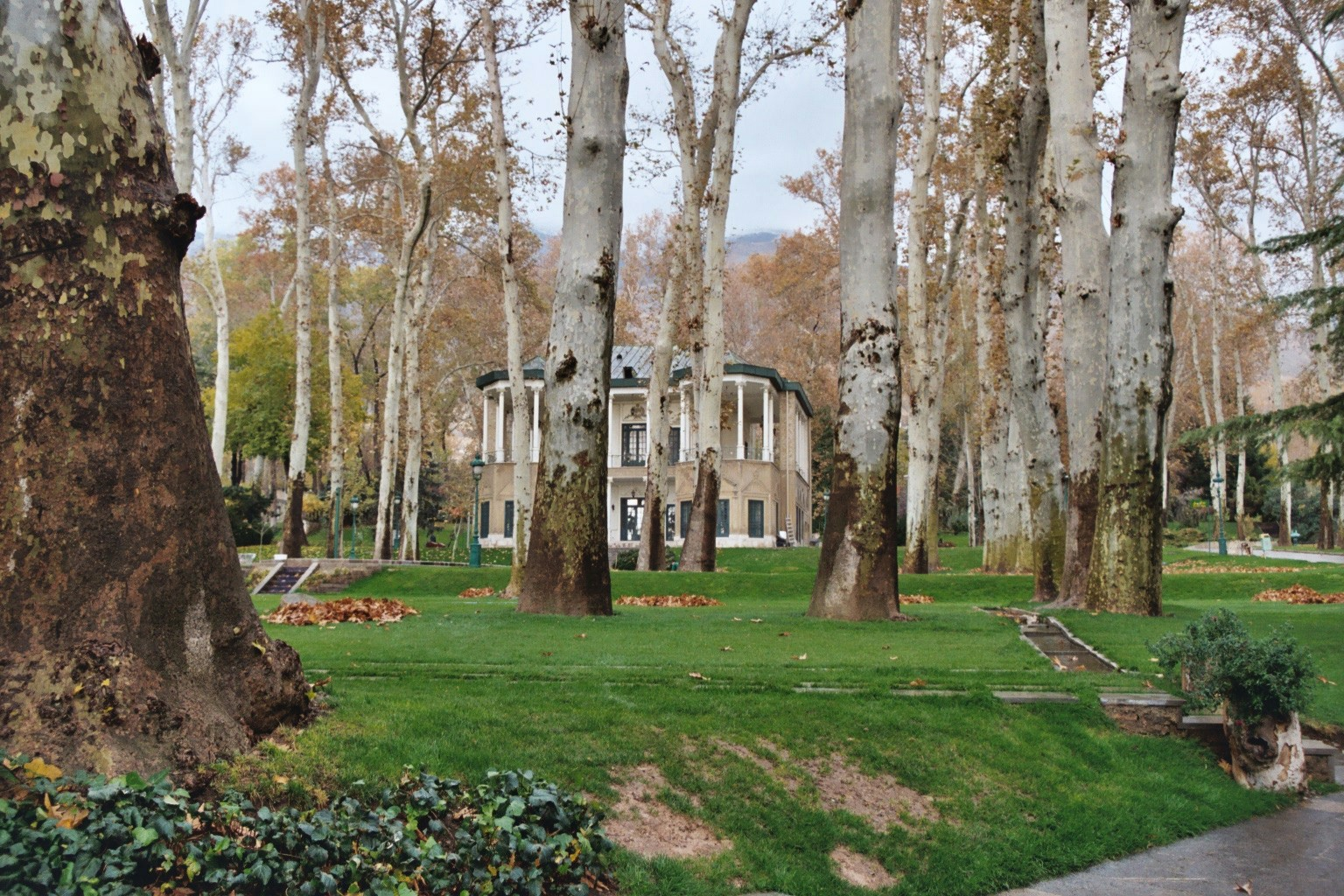
Area in front of the Ahmad Shahi Pavilion

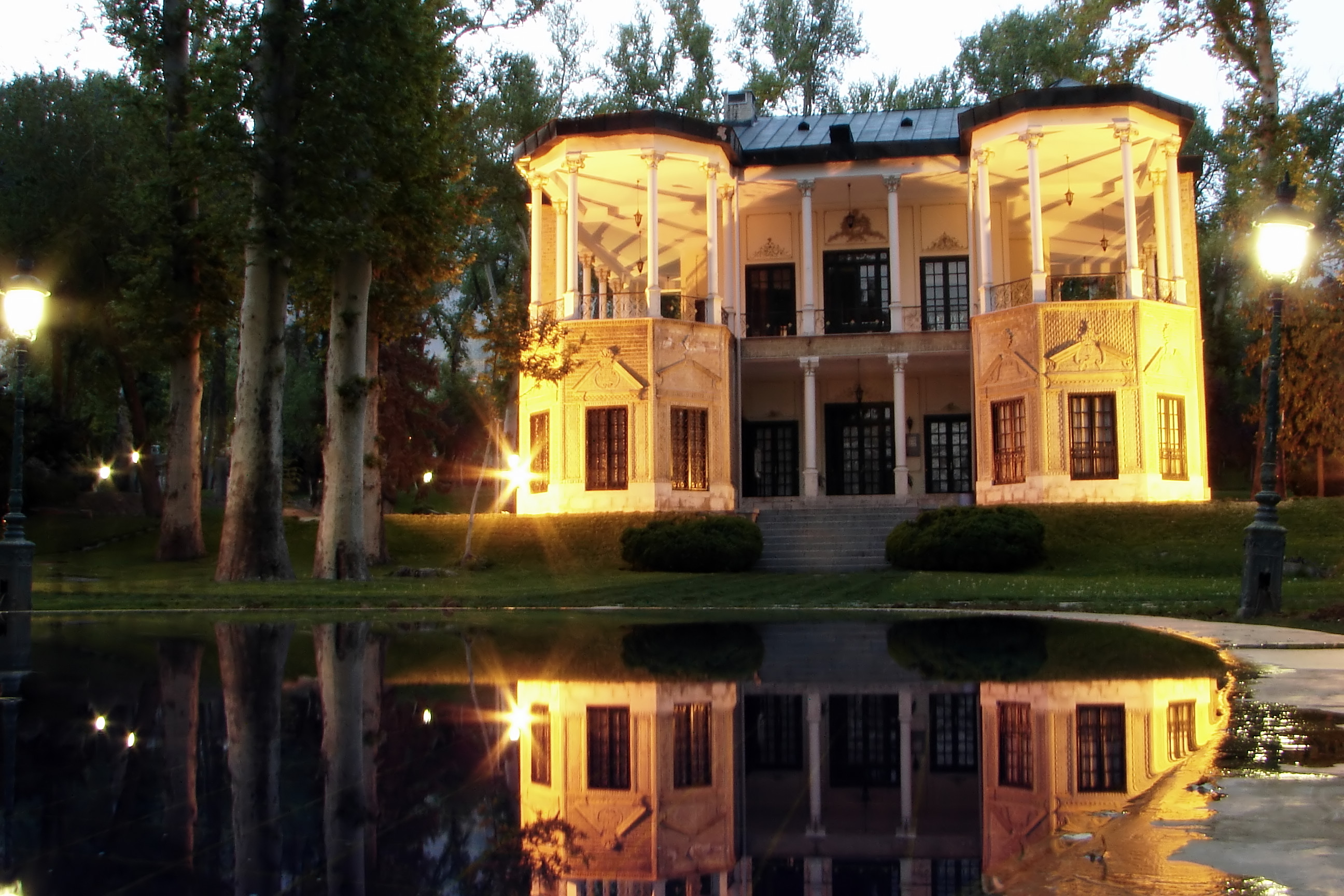
Ahmad Shahi Pavilion

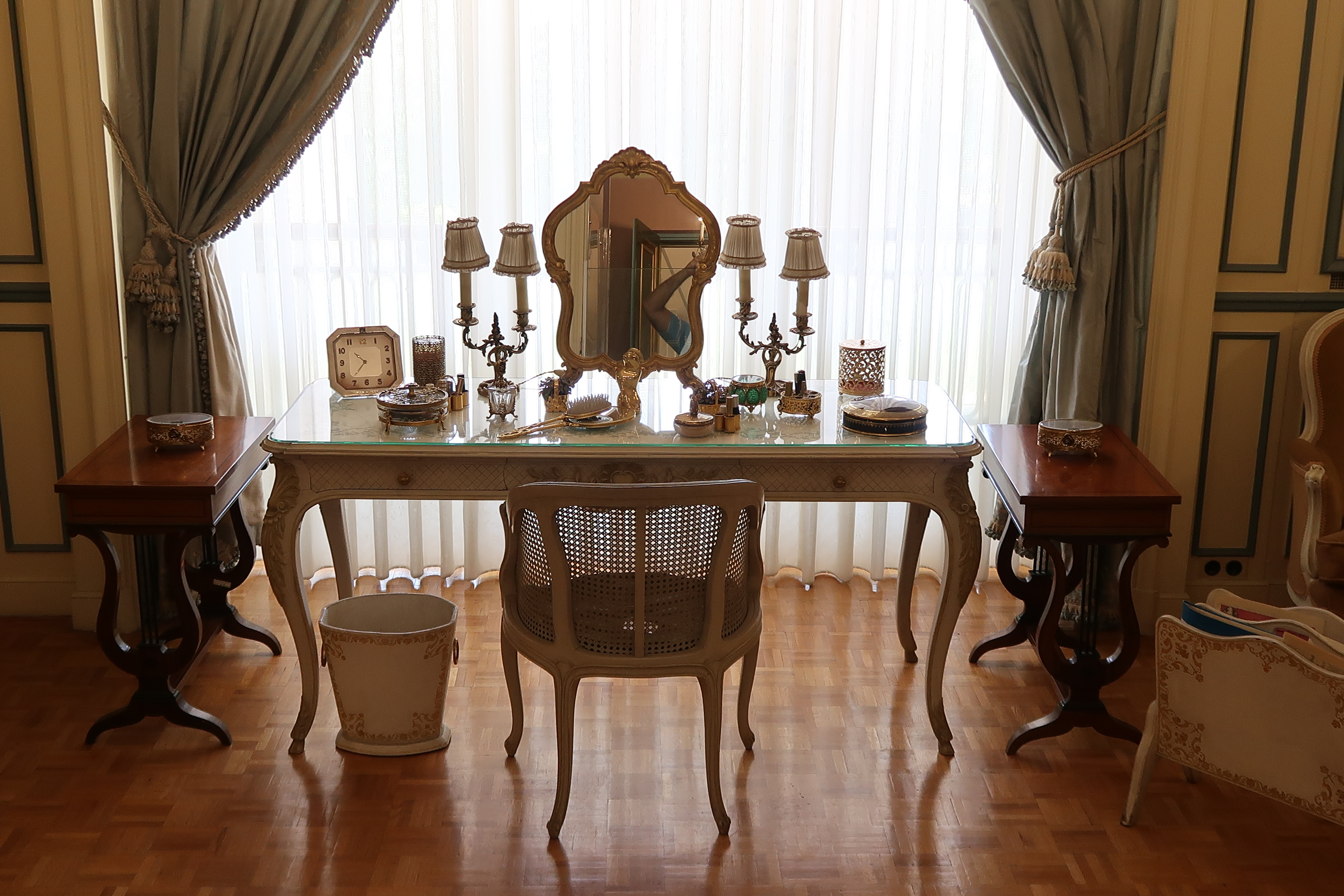
Shahbanu Farah's dressing table

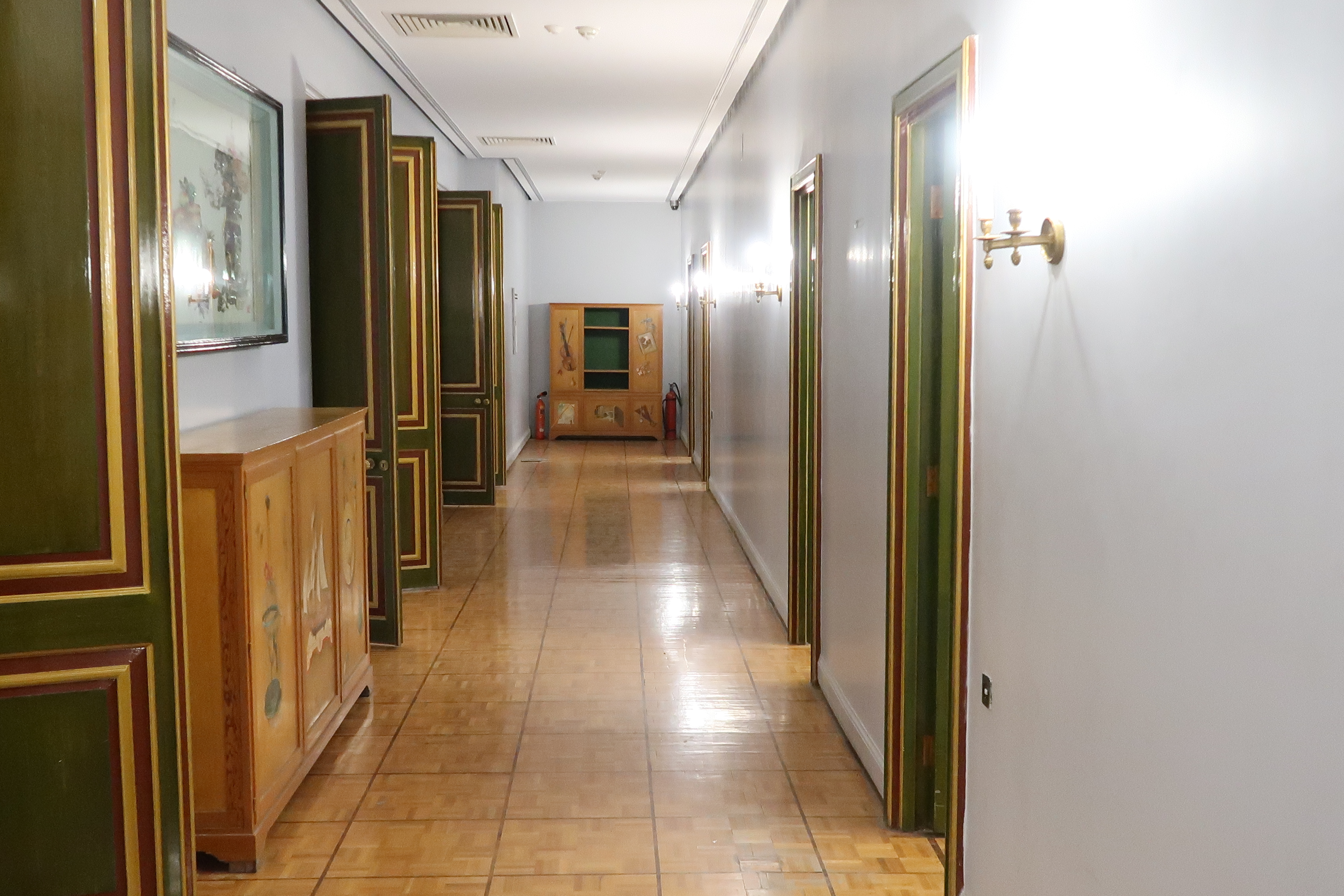
Corridor to private rooms in the Niavaran Palace

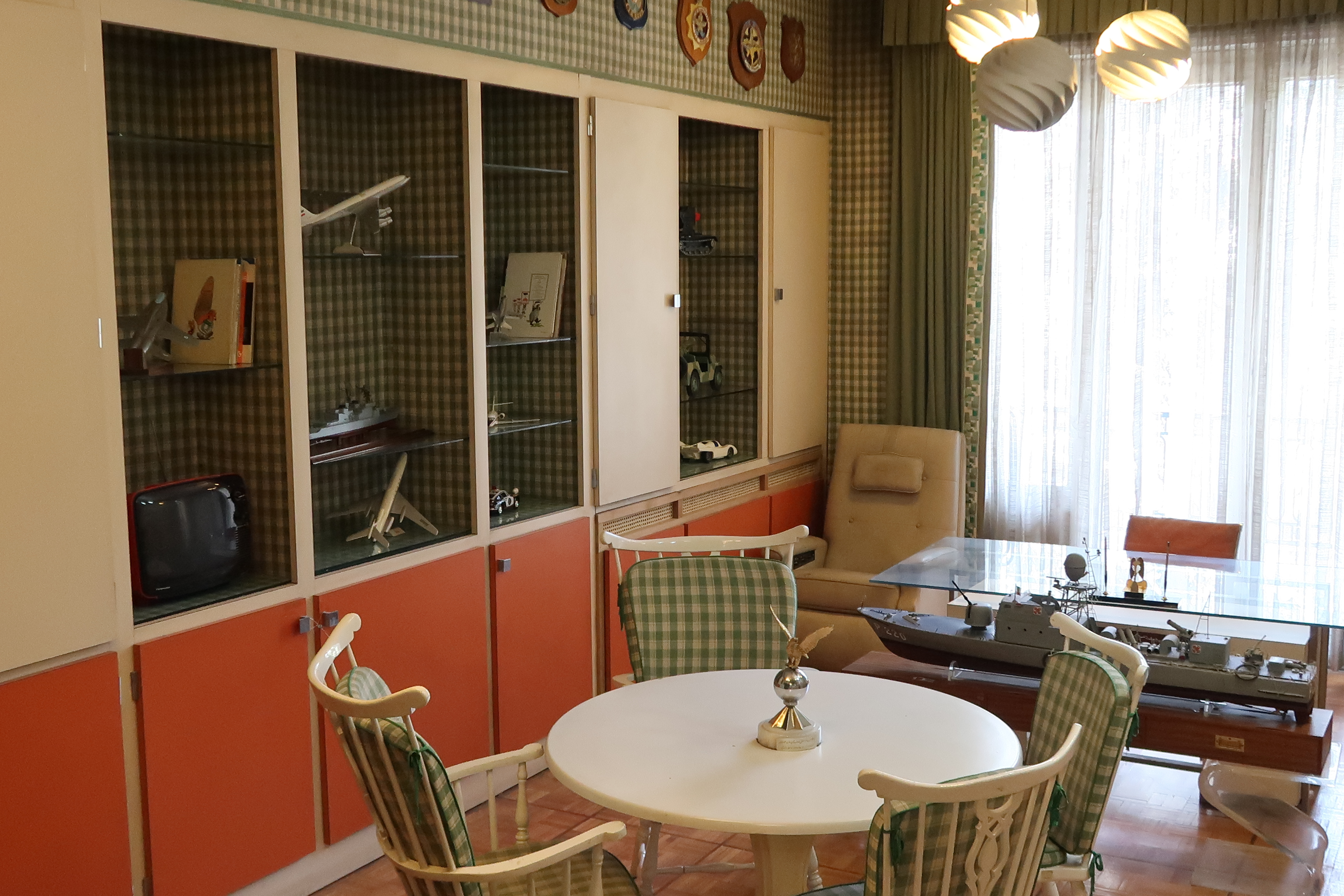
Interior of Prince Ali Reza's room

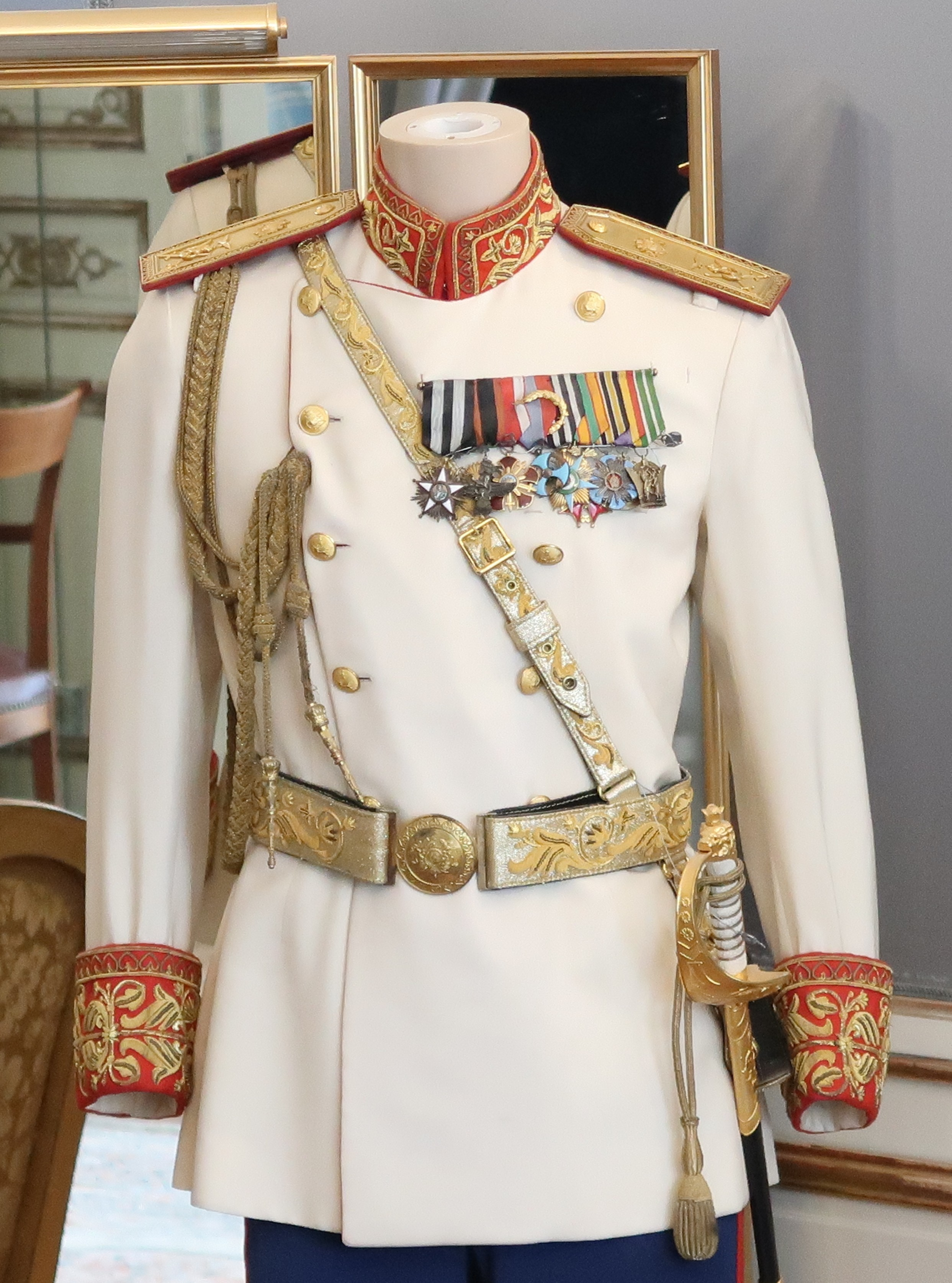
Mohammad Reza Shah's uniform in the Niavaran Palace

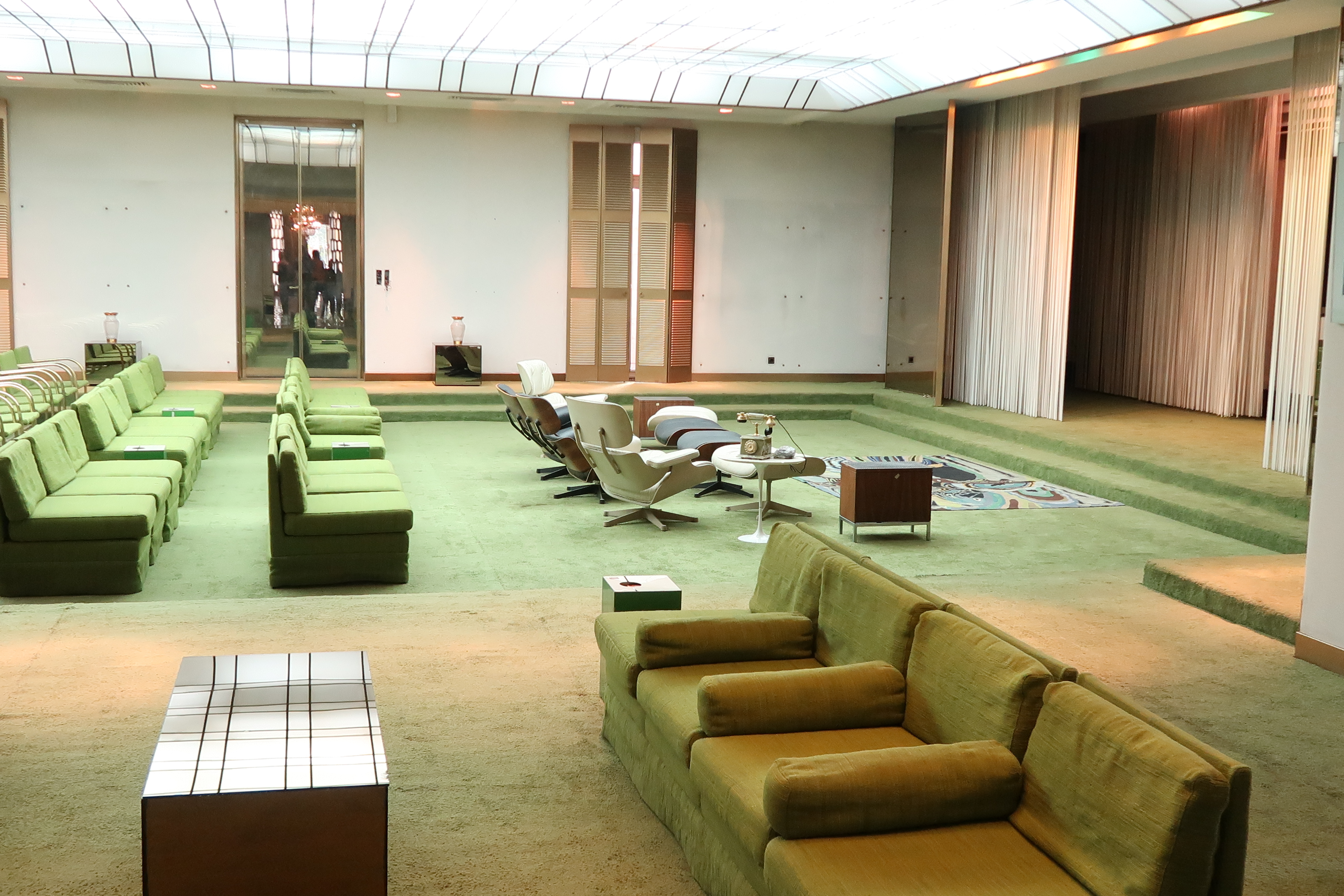
Cinema inside the Niavaran Mansion

== See also ==
- Architecture of Iran
- Cultural Heritage Organization of Iran
- Niavaran Park – a park built in 1969 next to the complex
- Golestan Palace – the former official royal Qajar-dynasty complex, located in Tehran
- Sa'dabad Complex – a complex built by the Qajar and Pahlavi monarchs, located in Tehran
- List of royal palaces
- List of palaces in Iran
