= Timeline of Iranian history =

The page details the timeline of History of Iran.

== 44th century BC ==
Year	Date	Event
4395 BC		Construction of the city of Susa in southwestern Iran.

== 33rd century BC ==
Year	Date	Event
3200 BC		The Elamite civilisation, one of the four oldest civilisations (along with Mesopotamia, the Indus Valley, and Egypt), begins in the far west and southwest of modern-day Iran.

== 21st century BC ==
Year	Date	Event
2000 BC		Earliest date for the arrival of Aryans into Iran from Central Asia. The migrations into Iran may have been completed as late as 1000 BC.

== 16th century BC ==
Year	Date	Event
1500 BC		Start of the Avestan period, which according to some scholars continued until the sixth century BC. The prophet Zoroaster lived at some point during this era, with any time between 1500 BC and 1000 BC being the most favoured date for his life by modern scholars.

== 13th century BC ==
Map showing the area of the Elamite kingdom and the neighbouring areas. The approximate Bronze Age extension of the Persian Gulf is shown.

Year	Date	Event
1250 BC		Untash-Napirisha, king of Elam, builds the Chogha Zanbil ziggurat complex in present-day Khuzestan province.
1210 BC		Elamite Empire reaches the height of its power.

== 8th century BC ==
Year	Date	Event
770 BC		The Persians start driving the Elamites of Anshan towards Susa.
727 BC		Deioces founds the Median government.
705 BC		Birth of Achaemenes (died c. 675 BC), the eponymous ancestor of the Achaemenid dynasty.

== 7th century BC ==
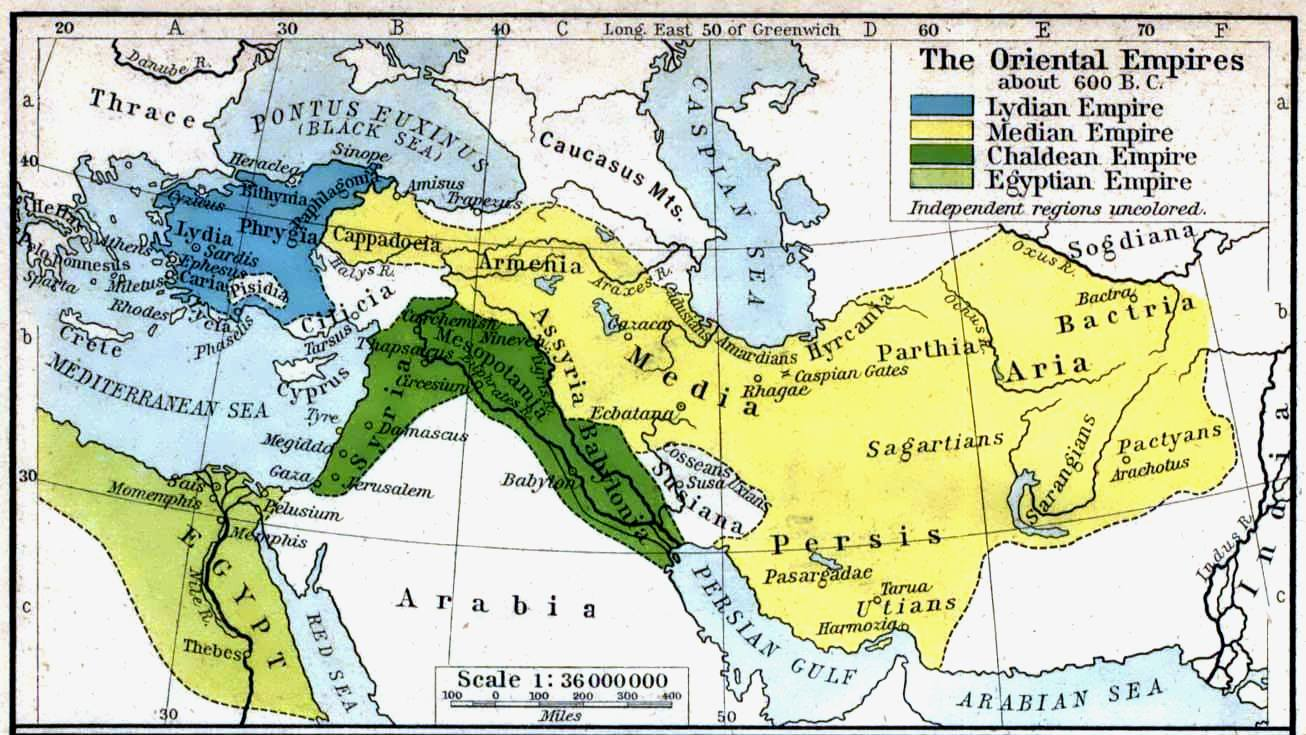
Map of the Ancient Near East between the fall of the Neo-Assyrian Empire in 612 BC and the establishment of the Achaemenid Empire in 550 BC; from a historical atlas illustrated by William Robert Shepherd.

Year	Date	Event
678 BC		Phraortes founds the Median Empire.
655–638 BC		The Assyrian conquest of Elam occurs. The Neo-Assyrian Empire under Assurbanipal is victorious at the Battle of Susa in 647 BC, resulting in the looting and sack of Susa.
633 BC		The Scythians invade Media.
625 BC		Cyaxares the Great becomes the king of the Medes after Phraortes dies fighting the Assyrians.
624 BC		The Medes under Cyaxares repel the Scythians.
612 BC		Together with the Neo-Babylonian Empire, Cyaxares the Great sacks the Assyrian capital Nineveh and destroys the Neo-Assyrian Empire.
600 BC		Cyrus I becomes king of Persia.

== 6th century BC ==
Map of the expansion of the Achaemenid Persian Empire in the second half of the sixth century BC.

Year	Date	Event
585 BC		Cyaxares dies and is succeeded by his son Astyages.
580 BC		Cyrus I dies and is succeeded by his son Cambyses I.
559 BC		Cambyses I dies and is succeeded by Cyrus the Great as king of Persia.
550 BC		The Achaemenid Empire is founded by Cyrus the Great after he overthrows and conquers the Median Empire.
547 BC		Cyrus conquers the Lydian Empire in western Asia Minor.
545–540 BC		Cyrus conquers Bactria, Arachosia, Sogdia, Sakastan, Chorasmia, and Margiana during his eastern campaign.
539 BC		Cyrus conquers the Neo-Babylonian Empire, frees thousands of slaves in Babylon and issues a declaration of human rights. This would later be inscribed into the Cyrus Cylinder.
535 BC		Cyrus commences the Achaemenid conquest of the Indus Valley.
530 BC		Cyrus dies, and is succeeded by his son Cambyses II.
525 BC		Cambyses II conquers Egypt after the Battle of Pelusium. Cyprus is also conquered by Cambyses.
522 BC		Cambyses dies and is succeeded by either his brother Bardiya or an impostor, Gaumata, pretending to be Bardiya. This individual dies months after becoming the King of Kings, and is succeeded by Darius the Great. Civil war breaks out as a result of the mysterious circumstances surrounding Darius' ascension, with Persis, Elam, Media, Assyria, Babylonia, Egypt, Parthia, Armenia, Margiana, Sattagydia, Sagartia, Hyrcania, and Scythia all revolting. Darius suppresses all the uprisings by 520 and restores order to the Achaemenid Empire.
518 BC		Darius completes the conquest of the Indus Valley.
513 BC		Darius expands the Achaemenid Empire into Europe, conquering European Scythia, Thrace, Paeonia, and the coastal Greek cities.
512 BC		Macedon submits to Persia.

== 5th century BC ==
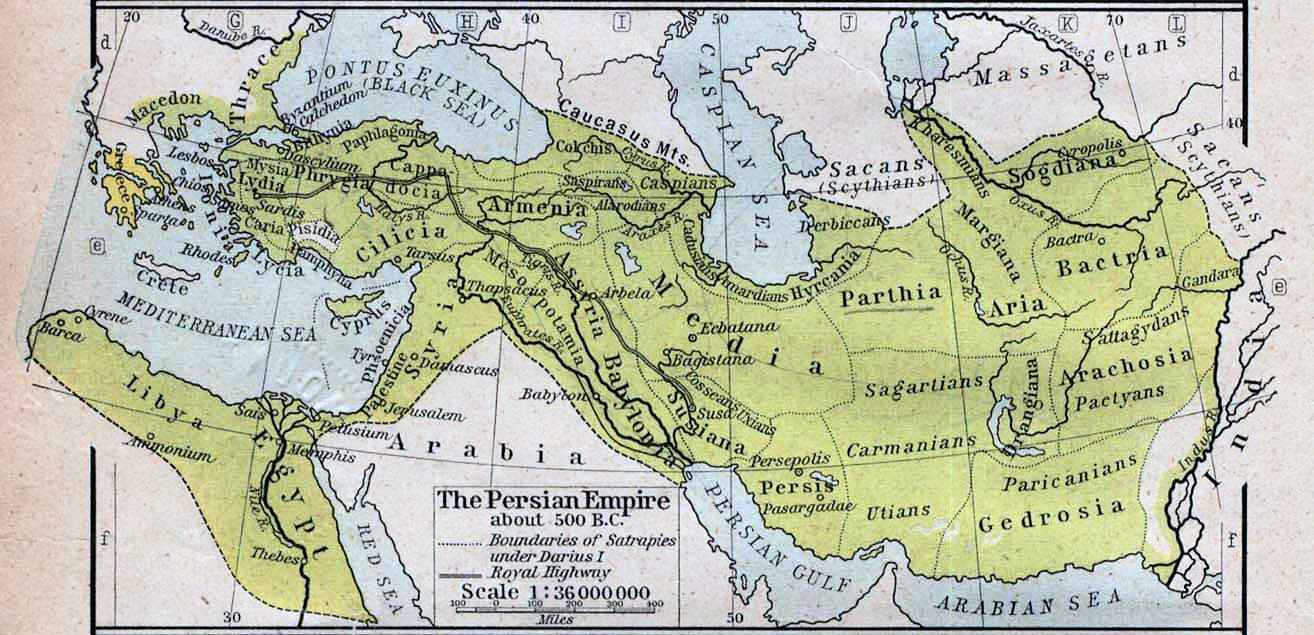
Map of the Achaemenid Empire under Darius the Great; from a historical atlas illustrated by William Robert Shepherd.

Year	Date	Event
490 BC	August/September	Battle of Marathon, Persian Empire is defeated by Greek states.
486 BC		Darius the Great dies; Xerxes I the Great succeeds him as King of Kings.
484 BC		The Babylonian Revolt, led by two pretenders to the Babylonian throne, is crushed by Xerxes.
480 BC		The Achaemenid Empire under Xerxes invades mainland Greece, reaching its greatest extent.
480 BC–479 BC		Persians capture and destroy Athens. The Acropolis, the Old Temple of Athena and the Older Parthenon are destroyed.
465 BC		Assassination of Xerxes I. Artaxerxes I becomes the King of Kings.
404 BC		Egypt breaks away from Persian rule.

== 4th century BC ==
Year	Date	Event
343 BC		Egypt is reconquered after the defeat of the Thirtieth Dynasty by Artaxerxes III.
334 BC		Alexander III of Macedon crosses the Hellespont into Asia.
334 BC	May	Alexander III of Macedon defeats the armies of the Achaemenid Empire in the Battle of the Granicus river
333 BC	5 November	Alexander III of Macedon defeats the armies of the Achaemenid Empire in the Battle of Issus
330 BC	20 January	Alexander III of Macedon defeats the armies of the Achaemenid Empire in the Battle of the Persian Gate
330 BC	July	Darius III, the last Achaemenid emperor is killed, bringing an end to the Achaemenid Empire.
330 BC		Persepolis, the capital of the Persian Achaemenid Empire is destroyed by Alexander III of Macedon.
323 BC	10/11 June	Alexander III dies in Babylon, triggering a division of his empire among his generals in a treaty known as the Partition of Triparadisus.
312 BC		Seleucus I Nicator, establishes the Seleucid Empire in the Persian territories of the erstwhile Macedonian Empire.

== 3rd century BC ==
Year	Date	Event
247 BC		Arsaces I establishes the Parthian Empire (also known as the Arsacid Empire) in present-day north-eastern Iran.

== 2nd century BC ==
Year	Date	Event
238 BC–129 BC		Seleucid-Parthian Wars – the Arsacids expel the Seleucids from Iran and Mesopotamia, and those lands pass into their hands.

== 1st century BC ==
Map of the Parthian Empire under Mithridates II in 94 BC.

Year	Date	Event
94 BC		The Parthian Empire reaches its peak, stretching from the northern reaches of the Euphrates, in what is now central-eastern Turkey, to present-day Afghanistan and western Pakistan.
54 BC		Beginning of the Roman–Parthian Wars, lasting till 217 CE.

== 3rd century ==
Year	Date	Event
208		Vologases V dies and is succeeded by his son Vologases VI.
211		Ardashir I establishes the Sasanian Empire in Istakhr in present-day Fars province.
224		Ardashir I defeats the last Parthian Shahanshah Artabanus IV, ending the Parthian Empire.
260		Persians defeated the Romans at the Battle of Edessa and take emperor Valerian prisoner for the remainder of his life.

== 4th century ==
Year	Date	Event
360		Sasanian Empire captures the town of Singara, in the Siege of Singara (360)
363		Battle of Samarra (363) between the Roman Empire and the Sasanian Empire, in which Roman emperor Julian is wounded, and subsequently dies of his wounds.
371		Roman Empire and Kingdom of Armenia defeat the Sasanian Empire and Caucasian Albania in the Battle of Bagavan

== 5th century ==
Year	Date	Event
421		Roman–Sasanian War of 421–422 after which Persian Empire agreed to tolerate Christianity and Roman Empire agreed to tolerate Zoroastrianism

== 6th century ==
Year	Date	Event
570–578		Aksumite–Persian wars, Yemen is annexed by the Sasanian Empire.
590		Khosrow II becomes ruler of the Sasanian Empire. During his rule till 628, Egypt, Jordan, Palestine and Lebanon are annexed into the Sasanian Empire

== 7th century ==
The Sasanian Empire reached its greatest extent only a decade before its destruction commenced. Territories shown in a lighter shade of blue are those conquered by Khosrow II during the Byzantine-Sasanian War of 602-628 and returned to the Romans following the war's conclusion.

Year	Date	Event
620		Sasanian Empire reaches its greatest height, encompassing all of present-day Iran and Iraq and stretching from the eastern Mediterranean (including Anatolia and Egypt) to Pakistan, and from parts of southern Arabia to the Caucasus and Central Asia.
626	June – July	Sasanian Empire lays siege to Constantinople, however is unable to capture it.
628	25 February	Khosrow II is deposed and killed by his son Kavad II.
628	6 September	Ardashir III becomes ruler of the Sasanian Empire.
632	16 June	Yazdegerd III becomes ruler of the Sasanian Empire.
633	May	Battle of Ullais in which the Rashidun Caliphate defeats the Sasanian Empire resulting in the massacre of 70,000 Persians by Arabs.
634	October	Sasanian Empire led by Bahman Jaduya defeats the Rashidun Caliphate in the Battle of the Bridge.
636		Arab invasion brings end of Sassanid dynasty and start of Islamic rule.
636	16–19 November	Rashidun Caliphate defeats the Sasanian Empire in the Battle of al-Qadisiyyah, takes control of present-day Iraq.
637		Destruction of the Ctesiphon library by Arabs of the Rashidun Caliphate.
642		Rashidun Caliphate defeats the Sasanian Empire in the Battle of Nahavand, resulting in the near collapse of the Sasanian Empire.
644	3 November	The second Rashidun caliph Umar ibn al-Khattab (r. 634–644) is assassinated by the Persian slave Abu Lu'lu'a Firuz.
644	6 November	Uthman ibn Affan becomes the third Rashidun Caliph. During his reign, almost the whole of the former Sassanid empire's territories rebel from time to time, with major rebellions in Armenia, Azerbaijan, Fars, Sistan (in 649), Khorasan (651), and Makran (650).
651		Rashidun Caliphate defeats the Sasanian Empire and the Göktürk Empire in the Battle of Oxus River.
651		Yazdegerd III, the last Sassanid emperor, is killed near Merv putting an end to both his dynasty and to organized Persian resistance to Arab conquest.

== 8th century ==
Year	Date	Event
716–717		Farrukhan the Great, ruler of Tabaristan in present-day Mazandaran province defeats the Muslim invasion under Yazid ibn al-Muhallab.
761		Tabaristan falls to Muslim invasion and becomes a province of the Abbasid Caliphate.
767		Ustadh Sis, Persian Zoroastrian revolutionary leader launches a rebellion, occupies Herat and Sistan before marching towards Merv. He initially defeats an Abbasid army under the command of al-Ajtham of Merv, but is himself defeated in a bloody battle against an army led by Muhammad ibn Abdallah.

== 9th century ==
Year	Date	Event
816–835		Babak Khorramdin a Persian Zoroastrian revolutionary leader of the Khorram-Dīnân movement defeats successive Arab generals of the Abbasid Caliphate.
821		Tahir ibn Husayn, an Iranian general under the Abbasid Caliphate, declared the establishment of the independent Tahirid dynasty.
867		Ya'qub-i Laith Saffari founded the Saffarid dynasty.
867		One of the earliest works in Early New Persian is composed by Muhammad ibn Wasif (died 909), a poet and secretary of the Saffarids.

== 10th century ==
Year	Date	Event
934		Sistan is conquered by the Samanid Empire.
930		Zoroastrian commander Mardavij establishes the Ziyarid dynasty and briefly conquers much of northern Persia before being betrayed and killed in 935 CE. The Ziyarid dynasty continued to rule over much of Tabaristan until its demise in 1090 CE.
934		The Buyid dynasty was founded.

== 11th century ==
Year	Date	Event
1010		The poet Ferdowsi finished writing the epic poem Shahnameh, a touchstone of the modern Persian language.

== 12th century ==
Year	Date	Event
1131		Death of the Persian poet Sanai.
1136		The Eldiguzid dynasty (also known as the Atabegs of Azerbaijan) is founded by Eldiguz.
1157		Death of the Seljuk sultan Ahmad Sanjar.
1182/3		Death of Rashid al-Din Vatvat, a secretary, poet, philologist in the Khwarazmian Empire.
1189		Third Crusade: Teutonic Knights destroyed several cities of the Middle East. As a result of the conflict, the safety of both Christian and Muslim unarmed pilgrims is guaranteed throughout the Levant.
1195		Death of the Persian poet Khaqani.

== 13th century ==
Year	Date	Event
1219		The Mongol conquest of Khwarezmia begins after two diplomatic missions to Khwarezm sent by Genghis Khan are massacred. In 1220 and 1221, Bukhara, Samarkand, Herat, Tus and Nishapur were razed, and the whole populations were slaughtered.
1220		Pursued by Mongol forces, Shah Muhammad II of Khwarezm dies on an island off the Caspian coast.

== 16th century ==
Year	Date	Event
1501		Ismail I established himself in Tabriz and declared himself the king (shah) of Iran.
1514	23 August	Battle of Chaldiran: The Ottoman Empire inflicted a severe defeat on a numerically inferior Persian force, opening the northwestern Iranian Plateau to their occupation.
1514	7 September	The Ottoman sultan entered Tabriz.
1514		A mutiny in the Ottoman army forced the sultan to withdraw.
1524	23 May	Ismail died. He was succeeded by his son Tahmasp I.
1590	21 May	The Treaty of Istanbul (1590) was signed between Safavid Empire and the Ottoman Empire ending the Ottoman–Safavid War (1578–1590), under which Safavid Empire ceded the Caucasus and western Iranian territories, for several years.

== 17th century ==
Year	Date	Event
1603–1612		In the Ottoman–Safavid War (1603–1612), Shah Abbas the Great inflicts crushing defeats on the Ottoman Empire, restoring Safavid territory that had been lost.
1609	November	Battle of Dimdim: The Persian army laid siege to a Kurdish fortress on the banks of Lake Urmia.
1610		Battle of Dimdim: The fortress was taken, and its occupants were massacred.
1629	19 January	Abbas I of Persia died. His grandson Safi of Persia succeeded him.
1639		The Treaty of Zuhab was signed between Persia and the Ottoman Empire, decisively partitioning the Caucasus between the two (with the greater part remaining Iranian,) and establishing what remains the border between Iran, Turkey, and Iraq.
1642		Safi died. He was succeeded by Abbas II of Persia.
1666		Abbas died. He was succeeded by Suleiman I of Persia.

== 18th century ==
Year	Date	Event
1709	21 April	Mirwais Khan Hotak, the leader of the Ghilzai clan and mayor of Kandahar, killed the Persian-appointed governor George XI of Kartli and declared himself King of Persia.
1722	July	Russo-Persian War (1722-1723): A Russian military expedition sailed to prevent the territories in disintegrating neighboring Safavid Iran fall into Ottoman hands.
1723	12 September	Treaty of Saint Petersburg (1723): The envoy of the shah signed a peace treaty ceding the cities of Derbent and Baku and the provinces of Shirvan, Guilan, Mazandaran and Astrabad to the Russian Empire.
1746	4 September	The Treaty of Kerden was signed between the Ottoman Empire and Iran, reaffirming the border drawn in the Treaty of Zuhab and allowing Iranian pilgrims to visit Mecca.
1795	11 September	Battle of Krtsanisi: The Persian army demolished the armed forces of Kartl-Kakheti, captured Tbilisi, and reconquered eastern Georgia, which comprised the territories of the Kartli-Kakheti.
1796	April	Persian Expedition of 1796: The tsarina of Russia launched a military expedition to punish Persia for its incursion into the Russian protectorate of Kartl-Kakheti.

== 19th century ==
Year	Date	Event
1804		Russo-Persian War (1804-1813): Russian forces attacked the Persian settlement Ganja.
1813	24 October	Russo-Persian War (1804–1813): According to the Treaty of Gulistan, the Persian Empire ceded all its North Caucasian and swaths of its Transcaucasian territories to Russia, comprising modern-day Dagestan, eastern Georgia, and most of the contemporary Republic of Azerbaijan.
1826	16 July	Russo-Persian War (1826-1828): The Persian army invaded the recently Russian-annexed territories in order to reclaim the lost regions.
1828	21 February	Russo-Persian War (1826–1828) Facing the possibility of a Russian conquest of Tehran and with Tabriz already occupied, Persia signed the Treaty of Turkmenchay; decisive and final cession of the last Caucasian territories of Iran comprising modern-day Armenia, the remainder of the Azerbaijan Republic that was still in Iranian hands, and Igdir (modern-day Turkey).
1881	21 September	Persia officially recognized Russia's annexation of Turkmenistan in the Treaty of Akhal.

== 20th century ==
Year	Date	Event
1905	December	The Persian Constitutional Revolution begins.
1906		The first Persian Constitution was adopted during the Persian Constitutional Revolution.
1911	December	The Persian Constitutional Revolution ends; Russian troops enter Tabriz and force Shah to shut down Majles.
1925		Reza Shah the Great overthrows the Qajar dynasty, becoming the first shah of the Pahlavi dynasty.
1925	31 March	Solar Hijri calendar legally adopted in Iran.
1941	25 August	Anglo-Soviet invasion of Iran: Three Soviet armies began invasion of Iran from the north, while British army invades Khuzestan and Central Iran.
1945	November	The Soviet Union established the Azerbaijan People's Government in Iranian Azerbaijan.
1946	22 January	The Soviet-backed Kurdish Republic of Mahabad declared its independence from Iran.
1946	2 March	Iran crisis: British troops withdrew from Iran. The Soviet Union violated its prior agreement and remained.
1946	9 May	Iran crisis: The Soviet Union withdrew from Iran.
1946	11 December	Iran regained control over the territory of the Azerbaijan People's Government.
1946	15 December	Iran conquered Mahabad.
1953	August	See also: Timeline of the Abadan Crisis Mohammad Mosaddegh is overthrown in a coup engineered by the British and American intelligence services after he nationalizes Iranian oil. Fazlollah Zahedi is proclaimed as prime minister and the Shah returns.
1979	11 February	See also: Timeline of the Iranian Revolution Iranian revolution: The Iranian Monarchy collapsed in a popular revolution.
1979	1 April	A referendum passed which made Iran an Islamic republic.
1979	4 November	Iran hostage crisis
1980	22 September	Iraq launched a full-scale invasion of Iran. The Iran–Iraq War would last until August 1988. The tactics used by both sides were similar to those used during World War I, including large-scale trench warfare with barbed wire stretched across trenches, manned machine-gun posts, bayonet charges, human wave attacks across a no-man's land, and extensive use of chemical weapons such as mustard gas by the Iraqi government against Iranian troops, civilians, and Iraqi Kurds.
1981	9 October	Later Supreme Leader Ali Khamenei assumes office as the President of Iran under Supreme Leader Khomenei.
1988	20 August	The Iran–Iraq War ends in a stalemate. The Iran–Iraq War was the deadliest conventional war ever fought between regular armies of developing countries.
1988		Massacres of Iranian political prisoners, thousands of cases of forced disappearances, executions, torture and inhuman and degrading treatment.
1989	3 June	1st Supreme Leader of Iran and founder of the Islamic Republic, Ruhollah Khomeini, dies.
1989	4 June	Ali Khamenei replaces Ruhollah Khomeini, becoming the second Supreme Leader of Iran.
1989	28 July	A constitutional reform was allegedly approved by 97.6% of voters in a referendum, it was the first and so far only time the Constitution of the Islamic Republic of Iran has been amended. It made several significant changes to the system of government of the Islamic Republic such as eliminating the need for the Supreme Leader (rahbar) of the country to be a marja or chosen by popular acclaim.
1989	16 August	Akbar Hashemi Rafsanjani becomes President of Iran, the first president to assume office under the post-reform constitution.
1994	22 February	Homa Darabi an Iranian pediatrician and women's rights activist immolates herself in protest against compulsory hijab.
1997	3 August	Mohammad Khatami replaces Rafsanjani as president.

== 21st century ==
Year	Date	Event
2001	8 June	Iranian presidential election, 2001: President Mohammad Khatami was reelected with vast majority.
2003	December	40,000 people are killed in an earthquake in southern Iran.
2005	24 June	Iranian presidential election, 2005: Ahmadinejad defeated the more liberal Rafsanjani.
2009	12 June	Iranian presidential election, 2009: Ahmadinejad re-elected for a second time after defeated Mousavi.
2009	13 June	2009–10 Iranian election protests: Protests in Iran over election results.
2013	3 August	Hassan Rouhani replaces Ahmadinejad as president.
2014		My Stealthy Freedom, an online movement in which women in Iran post photos of themselves without hijabs, as a protest against the compulsory hijab laws in the country.
2015	14 July	Signing of Iran nuclear deal between Iran and the P5+1 (the five permanent members of the United Nations Security Council— China, France, Russia, United Kingdom, United States—plus Germany).
2018	8 May	United States withdraws from the Iran nuclear deal
2017–19		Iranian woman protest against compulsory hijab in multiple cities including Tehran, Kangavar, Isfahan and Shiraz. Many are physically assaulted with injuries including broken limbs and imprisoned.
2019	9 September	Self immolation of women's rights activist Sahar Khodayari over six-month prison sentence for attempting to enter a public stadium to watch a football game, against the national ban against women at such events. Leads to widespread protests, and on 10 October 2019, more than 3,500 women attend the Azadi Stadium for a World Cup qualifier against Cambodia.
2020	3 January	Quds Force commander Qasem Soleimani and commander of the Iran-backed Kata'ib Hezbollah militia, Abu Mahdi al-Muhandis, are assassinated in a U.S. drone strike in Baghdad.
2021	3 August	Ebrahim Raisi replaces Rouhani as president.
2022	16 September	22-year-old Iranian woman Mahsa Amini, also known as Jina Amini, died in a hospital in Tehran, Iran, under suspicious circumstances, after her arrest by the Islamic Republic's Guidance Patrol. Eyewitnesses, including women who were detained with Amini, reported that she was severely beaten and that she died as a result of police brutality. Her death sparked widespread antigovernmental protests in Iran.
2022–23		Civil unrest and protests against the Islamic Republic of Iran associated with the death in police custody of Mahsa Amini (Persian: مهسا امینی) began on 16 September 2022 and lasted until 2023.
2024	1 April	Israel bombed the Iranian embassy in Damascus, causing a brief escalation to direct conflict between two countries which lasted for 18 days.
2024	19 May	Varzaqan helicopter crash and death of Iranian president, Ebrahim Raisi.
2024	28 July	Masoud Pezeshkian appointed as the president of Iran.
2024	31 July	Assassination of Ismail Haniyeh, Hamas political leader in Tehran, by an apparent Israel attack, increased tension between the two countries.
2025	13 June	At approximately 4AM local time, Israel launched missiles into Iran, targeting their nuclear plants in an effort to prevent them from developing nuclear weapons. Iran's top military officials, Mohammad Hossein Bagheri and Hossein Salami, were killed in the conflict.
2026	28 February	At about 8:30AM UTC, Israel and the US launched missiles toward Iran, striking military facilities, nuclear hubs, and government buildings. This was a coordinated attack on Iran, dubbed as Operation Roaring Lion, for Israel, and Operation Epic Fury, for the United States. Many other locations were struck from the Iranian retaliation, such as Dubai, Israel, and several other places. Trump had confirmed on Truth Social at around 9:30 PM UTC that Ali Khamenei is dead, calling him "evil."

== See also ==
- List of years in Iran
- List of Islamic years

Cities in Iran:

- Timeline of Bandar Abbas
- Timeline of Hamadan
- Timeline of Isfahan
- Timeline of Kerman
- Timeline of Mashhad
- Timeline of Qom
- Timeline of Shiraz
- Timeline of Tabriz
- Timeline of Tehran
- Timeline of Yazd

== Bibliography ==
- George Henry Townsend (1867). "Persia". A Manual of Dates (2nd ed.). London: Frederick Warne & Co.
- Henry Smith Williams, ed. (1908). "Chronological Summary of the History of Persia". Historians' History of the World. Vol. 24. London: Hooper & Jackson. hdl:2027/njp.32101063964728.
- Benjamin Vincent (1910). "Persia". Haydn's Dictionary of Dates (25th ed.). London: Ward, Lock & Co. hdl:2027/loc.ark:/13960/t89g6g776 – via HathiTrust.
- "Iran". Political Chronology of the Middle East. Europa Publications. 2003. pp. 45–64. ISBN 978-1-135-35673-6.
- Andrew J. Newman (2006). "Key Dates". Safavid Iran: Rebirth of a Persian Empire. I.B.Tauris. pp. 129+. ISBN 978-1-86064-667-6. (Covers 14th–18th centuries CE)
- "Timeline: A Modern History of Iran". PBS Newshour. USA: PBS. 2010. (Covers 1921–2009)
- Bosworth, C.E. (1993). "Muḥammad b. Waṣīf". In Bosworth, C. E.; van Donzel, E.; Heinrichs, W. P. & Pellat, Ch. (eds.). The Encyclopaedia of Islam, Second Edition. Volume VII: Mif–Naz. Leiden: E. J. Brill. ISBN 978-90-04-09419-2.
- Dandamayev, Muhammad A. (1990). "Cambyses II". Encyclopaedia Iranica, Vol. IV, Fasc. 7. pp. 726–729.
- Paul, Ludwig (2000). "PERSIAN LANGUAGE i. Early New Persian". In Yarshater, Ehsan (ed.). Encyclopædia Iranica (Online ed.). Encyclopædia Iranica Foundation.
- Chaumont, M. L.; Schippmann, K. (1988). "Balāš VI". Encyclopaedia Iranica, Vol. III, Fasc. 6. pp. 574–580.
- Shahbazi, A. Sh. (1986). "Arsacids i. Origins". In Yarshater, Ehsan (ed.). Encyclopædia Iranica. Vol. II/5: Armenia and Iran IV–Art in Iran I. London and New York: Routledge & Kegan Paul. p. 525. ISBN 978-0-71009-105-5.
- Yarshater, Ehsan (2021). "Chronological Table of Events in Iranian History". In Yarshater, Ehsan (ed.). Encyclopædia Iranica (Online ed.). Encyclopædia Iranica Foundation.
- Chalisova, Natalia (2000). "Waṭwāṭ, Rašid-al-Din". Encyclopædia Iranica, online edition. New York.
- Luther, K. A. (1987). "Atābakān-e Adharbayjān". Encyclopaedia Iranica, Vol. II, Fasc. 8. pp. 890–894.
