= Timeline of Kerman =

The following is a timeline of the history of the city of Kerman, Iran.

== Prior to 20th century ==
- 3rd century CE – Bardašir/Govāšir founded by Ardashir I.
- 644 – Muslim conquest of Kerman occurs (approximate date). Caliphate rule started.
- 861 – Anarchy at Samarra, decline and end of Caliphate rule (861–870s).
- 932 – Moḥammad b. Elyās in power.
- 1012 – Buyid Qawam al-Dawla in power.
- 1041–1072 - Construction of the Masjid i Malik mosque by Malik Kaverd Seljuk.
- 1048 – Seljuq Qawurd in power.
- 1188 – Seljuqs ousted (approximate date). (see Toghrul III)
- 1222 – Amir Buraq Hajib in power.
- 1349 – Jameh Mosque of Kerman built.
- 1390 – Masjid-i Pa Minar (mosque) built.
- 1596 – Ganj Ali Khan becomes governor.
- 1598 – Ganjali Caravanserai construction begins.
- 1625 – Ganjali Mint built.
- 1631 – Ganjali Bathhouse built.
- 1660s – Offices of English East India Company and Dutch East India Company in business.
- 1758 – Karim Khan in power.
- 1794 – Siege of Kerman by forces of Agha Mohammad Khan Qajar.
- 1801 – Ibrahim Khan becomes governor.
- 1875 – Population: 40,228.
- 1878 – Firuz Mirzā Farmānfarmā becomes governor.

== 20th century ==
- 1905 – Balasari and Shaykhi unrest.
- 1906 – Iranshahr High School of Kerman established.
- 1917 – بیمارستان نوریه (hospital) founded.
- 1956 – Population: 62,157.
- 1966 – Population: 89,700.
- 1969 – خانه شهر (assembly hall) built.
- 1970 – Kerman Airport begins operating.
- 1976 – Population: 145,613.
- 1978 – Friday Mosque of Kerman fire.
- 1986 – Population: 264,560.
- 1996 – Population: 384,991.
- 1998 – Sanat Mes Kerman F.C. (football club) formed.

== 21st century ==
- 2003 – 19 February: Airplane crash occurs near city.
- 2006 – Population: 515,114.
- 2007 – Shahid Bahonar Stadium opens.
- 2011 – Population: 534,441.
- 2012 – Mohammad Mehdi Zahedi becomes Member of the Parliament of Iran from the Kerman and Ravar (electoral district).
- 2013 – 14 June: Local election held.
- 2014 – City becomes part of newly formed national administrative Region 5.
- 2015 – Ali Babayi becomes mayor.
- 2020 – Funeral of Qasem Soleimani which around 62 killed in a stampede crush
- 2024 – Kerman bombings on a commemorative ceremony marking the assassination of Qasem Soleimani which killed 103

== See also ==
- Kerman history (fa)
- Kerman in the Qajar era
- Other names of Kerman (city)
- Category:Monuments in Kerman (city; in Persian)
- List of monuments in Kerman Province
- Kerman Province history (fa)
- Timelines of other cities in Iran: Bandar Abbas, Hamadan, Isfahan, Mashhad, Qom, Shiraz, Tabriz, Tehran, Yazd

== Bibliography ==
=== In English ===
- Edward Balfour (1885), "Kirman", Cyclopaedia of India (3rd ed.), London: B. Quaritch, hdl:2027/mdp.39015068611014
- George Nathaniel Curzon (1892). "(Kerman)". Persia and the Persian Question. Vol. 2. London. pp. 243–246. hdl:2027/hvd.32044022702278.
- Guy Le Strange (1905). "Kirman: (Kirman city)". Lands of the Eastern Caliphate. Cambridge University Press. pp. 302–307.
- "Kerman (town)" . Encyclopædia Britannica. Vol. 15 (11th ed.). 1910. p. 756.
- C. A. Storey (1936). "History of Persia: Kirman". Persian Literature: a Bio-Bibliographical Survey. Vol. 1. London: Luzac & Company. OCLC 1312518.
- Laurence Lockhart (1960). Persian Cities. London. pp. 112–119. OCLC 1370385.
- Paul Ward English, "Cultural Change and the Structure of a Persian City," in Carl Leiden, ed., The Conflict of Traditionalism and Modernism in the Muslim Middle East (Austin: University of Texas Press, 1966), pp. 32–48.
- Paul W. English, City and Village in Iran: Settlement and Economy in the Kirman Basin (Madison: University of Wisconsin Press, 1968).
- W. Barthold (1984). "Quhistan, Kirman, and Makran". An Historical Geography of Iran. Translated by Svat Soucek. Princeton University Press. pp. 133–147. ISBN 978-1-4008-5322-9.
- Ann K. S. Lambton (1986). "Kirman". In C. Edmund Bosworth; et al. (eds.). Encyclopaedia of Islam. Vol. 5 (2nd ed.). Brill. pp. 147–166. via Google Books
- Noelle Watson, ed. (1996), "Kerman", International Dictionary of Historic Places, Fitzroy Dearborn, ISBN 9781884964039
- Stuart D. Sears (2003). "Legitimation of Hakam b. al-'As: Ummayad Government in Seventh-Century Kirman". Iranian Studies. doi:10.1080/021086032000062587. S2CID 161094119.
- C. Edmund Bosworth, ed. (2007). "Kirman". Historic Cities of the Islamic World. Leiden: Koninklijke Brill. p. 284. ISBN 978-9004153882.
- Lisa Golombek (2008). "'Citadel, Town, Suburbs' Model and Medieval Kirman". In Salma K. Jayyusi; et al. (eds.). The City in the Islamic World. Leiden: Koninklijke Brill. pp. 445–465. ISBN 9789004162402.
- C. Edmund Bosworth (2013). "Kerman: From the Islamic Conquest to the Coming of the Mongols". Encyclopædia Iranica.
- James M. Gustafson (2014). "Kerman: Qajar Period". Encyclopædia Iranica. (Covers circa 1795–1925)
- Rudi Matthee (2014). "Kerman in the Safavid Period". Encyclopædia Iranica.
- Xavier de Planhol; Bernard Hourcade [in French] (2014). "Kerman: Historical Geography". Encyclopædia Iranica.
- Ḥabib-Allāh Zanjāni; Moḥammad-Ḥosayn Nejātiān (2014). "Kerman: Population of the province, sub-province, and city". Encyclopædia Iranica.
- James M. Gustafson (2016). Kirman and the Qajar Empire: Local Dimensions of Modernity in Iran, 1794–1914. Routledge. ISBN 978-1-317-42791-9.

=== In other languages ===
- Muhammad b. Ibraham, Tarikh-i Saljuqiyan-i Kirman (Written in 17th century)
- Albert Houtum-Schindler; Heinrich Kiepert (1881). "Reisen im Südlichen Persien 1879". Zeitschrift der Gesellschaft für Erdkunde zu Berlin (in German). 16. Dietrich Reimer Verlag: 327+. "Kerman"
- Mohammad Ebrahim Bastani Parizi (1956). Rahnumā-yi ās̱ ār-i tārīkhī-yi Kirmān [Guide to the historical monuments of Kirman] (in Persian).
- Gianroberto Scarcia [in Italian] (1963). "Kerman 1905: La guerra tra Seihi e Balasari". Annali del Instituto Universitario Orientale di Napoli. New Series (in Italian) (13). Università degli Studi di Napoli "L'Orientale".
- Ahmad Ali Khan Waziri (1966). "Joghrafiy_-ye mamlekat-e Kerm_n". Farhang-e Īrān-zamīn (in Persian) (14). ISSN 0014-7788.
- Heribert Busse. "Kerman im 19. Jahrhundert nach der Geographie des Waziri," Der Islam 50 (1973): 284–312. (Includes translation of: Ahmad 'Ali Vaziri. Jughrafiya-yi mamlakat-i Kirman (in Persian).)
- Aḥmad-ʿAli Khan Waziri (1974). Mohammad Ebrahim Bastani Parizi (ed.). Joḡrāfiā-ye Kermān (in Persian). Tehran. OCLC 165121614. (Written in 17th century CE)
- Aḥmad-ʿAli Khan Waziri (1985). Moḥammad-Ebrāhim Bāstāni Pārizi (ed.). Tāriḵ-e Kermān (in Persian) (3rd ed.). Tehran. OCLC 315437163. (Written in 17th century CE; 2 vols)
- Bastani Parizi. "Principes de l'évolution de la tolérance dans l'histoire de Kerman," in A. Harrak, ed., Contacts Between Cultures (Lewiston: Edwin Mellen Press, 1992)

== Images ==
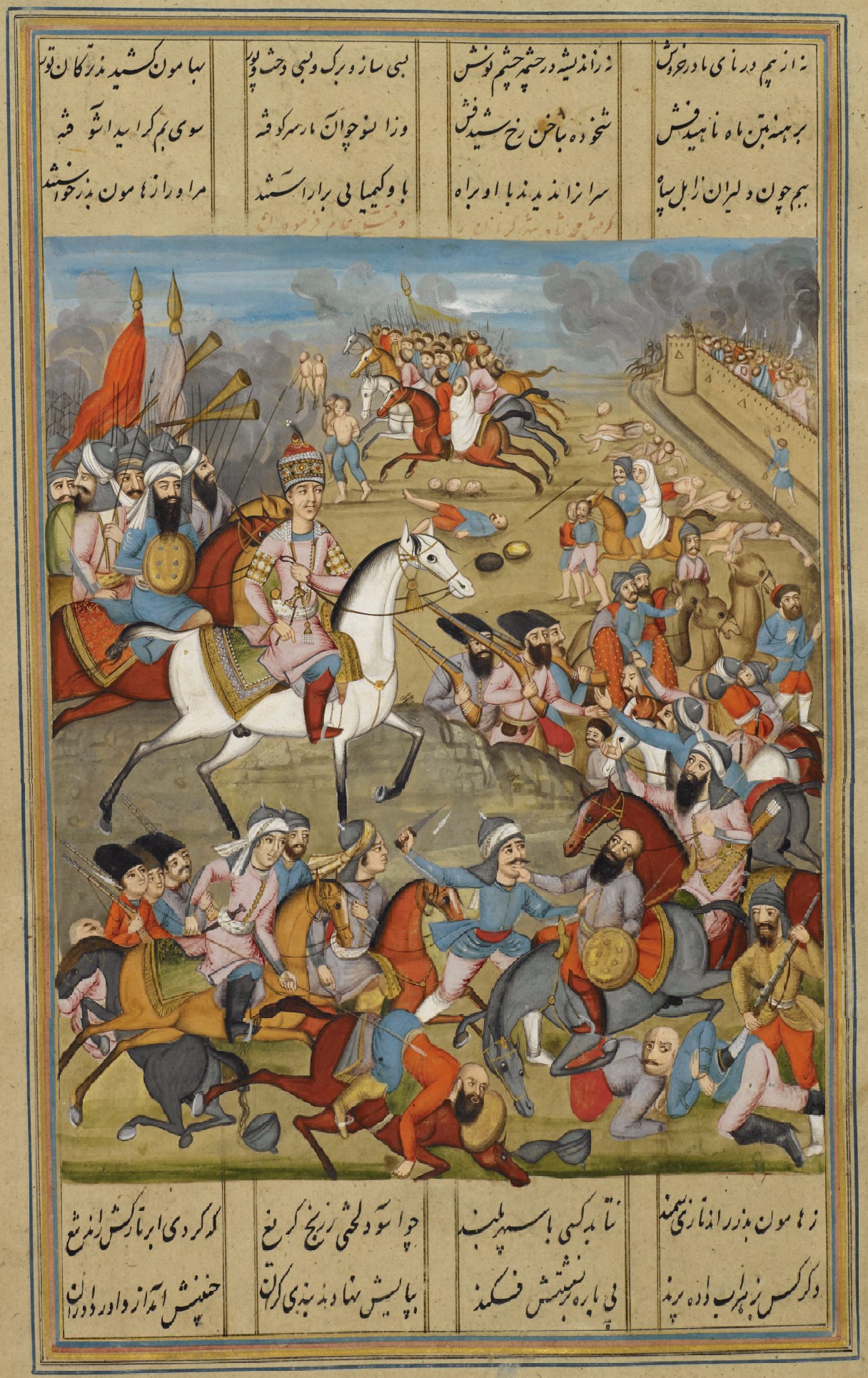
1794 siege of Kerman
