= Timeline of Tehran =

Coordinates: 35°41′46″N 51°25′23″E

The following is a timeline of the history of the city of Tehran, Iran.

== Prior to 20th century ==
Video shows Tehran during years (Tahmasp Fortification 1550s, Naseri Fortification 1850s, current area and gates of the city)

- 1553 – City wall built.
- 1576 – Golestan Palace completed.
- 1660 – Grand Bazaar reported to be open.
- 1723 – Afghans (Pashtuns) occupy the city.
- 1751 – Takht-e Marmar Iwan built.
- 1759 – Khalvat-e Karim Khani built (approximate date).
- 1785 – Town besieged by the forces of Agha Mohammad Khan Qajar.
- 1786 – Agha Mohammad Khan Qajar moves Iran's capital from Sari to Tehran.
- 1790 – Qajar Palace built (later became Qasr Prison).
- 1796 – Population: less than 15,000.
- 1807 – Negarestan Palace built
- 1810–25 – Construction of the Shah Mosque.
- 1829 – 11 February: Russian embassy attacked; Alexander Griboyedov and others killed.
- 1834 – Ali Mirza Zel as-Soltan in power.
- 1835 – Mohammad Shah Qajar in power.
- 1837 – Kaghaz-e Akhbar (newspaper) begins publication.
- 1850 – Sahebgharaniyeh Palace built.
- 1851 – Dar al-Fonun (school) founded.
- 1861 – 1 March: Unrest.
- 1865 – Golestan Palace rebuilt.
- 1867
  - Shams-ol-Emareh built
  - Toopkhaneh Square built
- 1868 – Takyeh Dowlat built
- 1869
  - City expanded by Naser al-Din Shah Qajar.
  - Population: 155,000.
- 1872 – Jolfa–Tabriz–Tehran telegraph begins operating (approximate date).
- 1873
  - City wall rebuilt.
  - Laleh-Zar Street built
  - Museum founded by Naser al-Din Shah.
- 1881 – Baharestan Palace built.
- 1883
  - Abyaze Palace built.
  - Ruby Palace built
- 1888 – Tehran–Rey Railway begins operating.
- 1889 – Imperial Bank of Persia headquartered in Tehran.
- 1896
  - 1 May: Assassination of Naser al-Din Shah Qajar; Mozaffar ad-Din Shah Qajar in power.
  - Tarbiyat newspaper begins publication.
- 1899 – Tehran School of Political Sciences established.

== 20th century ==
=== 1900s–1940s ===
- 1906
  - "Bast of the constitutionalists at the British legation" occurs.
  - 5 August: Mozaffar ad-Din Shah issues the firman proclaiming constitutional monarchy at Sahebgharaniyeh Palace
  - Baharestan parliament building inaugurated.
- 1907
  - 31 August: Assassination of Prime Minister Mirza Ali Asghar Khan Amin al-Soltan.
  - German School established.
- 1908
  - Khalil-Khan Saghfi Alam-Edoleh becomes mayor.
  - Bombardment of the Iranian parliament by Russian forces.
- 1909
  - 13–15 July: City taken by nationalist forces of Ali-Qoli Khan Bakhtiari.
  - 18 July: Ahmad Shah Qajar in power.
- 1910 – Mirza Abbaskhan Mohandes Bashi Hodud becomes mayor.
- 1911 – Population: approximately 280,000.
- 1914 – Ebrahim-Khan Yomn-Olsaltaneh Monaghah becomes mayor.
- 1915 – The Battle of Robat Karim was fought by the Iranian people, near Tehran, during World War I and Persian campaign under the command of Heydar Latifiyan against the occupation of Iran by Russian forces.
- 1918
  - School of Law established.
  - Conservatory of Music founded.
- 1919 – Armaḡān literary journal begins publication.^{(fa)}
- 1920 – Iran Club (football) founded.
- 1921
  - 21 February: Persian Cossack forces occupy city during the 1921 Persian coup d'état.
  - Zia ol Din Tabatabaee becomes mayor.
- 1923 – Karim Buzarjomehri becomes mayor.
- 1925 / 1304 SH – 31 March: Solar Hijri calendar legally adopted in Iran.
- 1926
  - 25 April: Coronation of Reza Shah held at the Salam Hall of Golestan Palace
  - Ettela'at newspaper begins publication.
- 1929
  - Governmental Technical Institute founded.
  - Qasr prison, Iran's first modern prison, opens on the site of Qajar Palace
- 1931 – University of Tehran Botanical Garden founded.
- 1932 – The Second Eastern Women's Congress takes place in Tehran in Iran.
- 1943 – Valiasr Street construction finished
- 1934
  - University of Tehran inaugurated.
  - Gholi Hooshmand becomes mayor.
- 1937
  - National Library of Iran inaugurated.
  - Marble Palace completed.
- 1938
  - Trans-Iranian Railway (Bandar Shah-Tehran-Bandar Shahpur) in operation.
  - Beginnings of Mehrabad International Airport as an airfield for aviation club planes
  - Ghasem Soor-Esrafil becomes mayor.
- 1939
  - Rangsazi Iran was founded
- 1940
  - Ali Asghar Foruzan becomes mayor.
  - Population: 400,000.
- 1941 – Mostafa Gholi Ram becomes mayor, succeeded by Mohammad Sajjadi.
- 1942
  - Seyed Mehdi Emadolsaltaneh becomes mayor.
  - Bread riot.
- 1943
  - Tehran Conference held.
  - Fazlollah Bahrami becomes mayor, succeeded by Abbasgholi Golshaeeyan.
- 1944 – Gholam-Hossein Ebtehaj becomes mayor.
- 1945
  - Fada'iyan-e Islam (political group) founded.
  - Mahmood Nariman becomes mayor, succeeded by Mehdi Mashayekhi.
- 1947
  - Institut français d'iranologie de Téhéran founded.
  - Mohammad Khalatbari becomes mayor, succeeded by Hesamedin Dolatabadi.
- 1949
  - Apadana art gallery opens.
  - Mohammad Mehran becomes mayor.

=== 1950s–1960s ===
- 1950 – Mehdi Namdar becomes mayor.
- 1951
  - Arsalan Khalatbari becomes mayor, succeeded by Mohammad Mehran.
  - Embassy of the United States, Tehran built.
- 1952 – Nostratollah Amini becomes mayor.
- 1953
  - August – Coup d'état.
  - Mohsen Nasr becomes mayor.
  - City Park created.
- 1954 – Mohammad-Ali Saffari becomes mayor, succeeded by Gholam-Hossein Ebtehaj.
- 1955
  - Nosratollah Montasser becomes mayor.
  - Alavi Institute founded.
- 1956
  - Allameh Tabataba'i University established.
  - Population: 1,512,032.
  - Mahmood Davaloo becomes mayor.
- 1957 – Mousa Maham becomes mayor.
- 1958
  - Tehran Polytechnic and Tehran Zoo established.
  - Tehran Biennial art exhibit begins.
  - Mousa Maham becomes mayor.
  - Ekbatan Town (Persian: شهرک اکباتان - Shahrak e Ekbātān).
- 1959
  - Nasser Zolfaghari becomes mayor.
  - World Wrestling Championships held.
- 1960
  - Fathollah Forood becomes mayor.
  - Central Bank of Iran established.
- 1961
  - Mohsen Nasr becomes mayor.
  - German Speaking Evangelical Church, Tehran built.
- 1962
  - Ahmad Nafisi becomes mayor.
  - Tehran War Cemetery built.
- 1963
  - Ali Akbar Tavana becomes mayor, succeeded by Ziaeddin Shademan.
  - Persepolis Athletic and Cultural Club established.
  - Population: 2,317,116 (estimate).
- 1964
  - Higher Educational Institute For Girls founded.
  - International Regional Cooperation for Development headquartered in Tehran.
- 1965
  - Mohandes Taghi Sarlak becomes mayor.
  - Aryamehr Technical University and Hosseiniyeh Ershad (institute) founded.
- 1966
  - Rey and Tajrish become part of Tehran.
  - Malek National Museum and Library opens.
  - Laleh Park created.
  - Population: 2,719,730.
- 1967
  - Mohammad-Ali Saffari becomes mayor, succeeded by Manouchehr Pirooz.
  - 26 October: Coronation of Mohammad Reza Pahlavi held at the Salam Hall of Golestan Palace
- 1968
  - April–May: International Conference on Human Rights held in city.
  - Tehran Derby (football contest) begins.
  - National Botanical Garden of Iran established.
  - Niavaran Palace built.
  - Javad Shahrestani becomes mayor.
- 1969 – Gholamreza Nikpey becomes mayor.

=== 1970s–1990s ===
- 1970 – Saint Sarkis Cathedral built as the new cathedral of the Armenian Diocese of Tehran.
- 1971
  - February: International OPEC meeting held in city; "Tehran Agreement" signed.
  - Azadi Tower and Azadi Stadium built.
- 1972
  - City Theater of Tehran and National Arts Museum inaugurated.
  - Evin Prison built.
  - Sister city relationship established with Los Angeles, USA.
- 1973
  - Apadana Stadium opens in Ekbatan.
  - Population: 4,002,000 (approximate).
- 1974 – September: 7th Asian Games (sport contest) held in city.
- 1976
  - 16 September: Alleged UFO sighting.
  - Carpet Museum of Iran founded.
- 1977 – Reza Abbasi Museum, Jamshidieh Stone Garden, and Tehran Museum of Contemporary Art open.
- 1978
  - 8 September: Protesters shot in Zhaleh Square.
  - Javad Shahrestan becomes mayor again.
- 1979
  - 1 February: Ayatollah Khomeini returns.
  - 30–31 March: National Iranian Islamic Republic referendum held.
  - 4 November: Students seize United States embassy and its occupants; Iran hostage crisis begins.
  - Mohammad Tavasoli becomes mayor.
  - Tehran Times newspaper begins publication.
- 1980
  - Reza Zavarehi becomes mayor, succeeded by Seyed amal ol-din Neek Ravesh.
  - Iranian legislative election, 1980 (Tehran, Rey, Shemiranat and Eslamshahr) held.
  - German Embassy School Tehran inaugurated.
- 1981
  - 28 June: Haft-e Tir bombing.
  - Apadana Residential Complex built.
  - Gholam-Hossein Deljoo becomes mayor.
- 1982
  - Mohammad Kazem Seyfian becomes mayor.
  - Population: 5,734,000 (estimate).
- 1983
  - Center for the Great Islamic Encyclopedia and Institut Français de Recherche en Iran established.
  - Hossein Bonakdar becomes mayor, succeeded by Mohammad-Nabi Habibi.
  - Musala of Tehran built.
- 1985 – Abrar newspaper begins publication.
- 1986 – Concept of "Greater Tehran" in use.
- 1987 – Morteza Tabatabaei becomes mayor.
- 1988
  - Tehran International Book Fair begins.
  - Gholamhossein Karbaschi becomes mayor.
- 1989
  - 11 June: Funeral of Ayatollah Khomeini.
  - Mausoleum of Khomeini built.
  - Tehran International Puppet Theatre Festival begins.
- 1991 – Bahman Cultural Center opens.
- 1992
  - February: International Economic Cooperation Organisation summit held in Tehran.
  - Hamshahri newspaper begins publication.
  - Trolleybus begins operating.
  - Iranian Crown Jewels on display at the Central Bank.
- 1996 – Population: 6,758,845.
- 1997 – November: 1st West Asian Games (sport contest) held in city.
- 1999
  - February: Local election held
  - July: Student protest.
  - Tehran Metro begins operations.
  - City Council of Tehran begins.
  - Morteza Alviri becomes mayor.
  - Time Museum founded

== 21st century ==
=== 2000s ===
- 2002
  - Mohammad-Hassan Malekmadani elected mayor, succeeded by acting mayor Mohmmad-Hossein Moghimi.
  - Shahid Dastgerdi Stadium and Shahid Derakhshan Stadium built.
  - Film Museum of Iran in Ferdows Garden and Iranian National Museum of Medical Sciences History open.
- 2003
  - February: Local election held.
  - June: Protest against clerics.
  - Al Alam television begins broadcasting.
  - Mahmoud Ahmadinejad becomes mayor.
- 2004
  - February: Asian Indoor Athletics Championships held in city.
  - Tehran Imam Khomeini International Airport opens.
- 2005
  - 6 December: Iranian Air Force C-130 crash occurs.
  - Tehran International Tower and Bank Markazi Tower built.
  - Ali Saeedlou becomes mayor, succeeded by Mohammad Bagher Ghalibaf.
- 2006
  - Population: 7.5 million (approximate).
  - Iran Dokht magazine headquartered in Tehran.
- 2007
  - Milad Tower built.
  - Tehran Peace Museum opens.
  - International Festival of Peace Poetry begins.
- 2008
  - Tehran Bus Rapid Transit begins operating.
  - Safir Office Machines Museum and Mellat Cinema Complex open.
- 2009
  - Iranian presidential election protests.

=== 2010s ===
- 2010
  - January: Assassination of scientist Masoud Alimohammadi in Gheytarieh.
  - April: International Conference on Disarmament and Non-Proliferation held in city.
  - May: International 14th G-15 summit held in city.
  - Election protests.
  - Disappeared statues.
- 2011
  - Protests.
  - November: British Embassy attacked.
  - Population: 8,154,051.
- 2012
  - August: International 16th Summit of the Non-Aligned Movement held in city.
- 2013
  - Local election.
- 2014
  - June: Sandstorm.
  - City becomes part of newly formed national administrative Region 1.

=== 2020s ===
- 2021
  - Alireza Zakani becomes the mayor of Tehran.
- 2022
  - Mahsa Amini protests
- 2024
  - July: Assassination of Ismail Haniyeh, Hamas political leader
- 2025
  - June: Tehran is attacked in the Twelve-Day War
  - December: Beginning of the 2025–2026 Iranian protests with Tehran's shopkeepers
- 2026
  - January: Iran massacres
  - February–present: Tehran is attacked in the 2026 Iran war
  - February–present: Assassinations of Iranian officials
    - February: Assassination of Ali Khamenei
    - March: Assassination of Ali Larijani
  - March: Golestan Palace damaged from Israeli airstrike shockwaves

== See also ==
- Tehran history
- List of mayors of Tehran
- List of members of City Council of Tehran
- List of religious centers in Tehran
- List of museums in Tehran
- Timeline of the Iranian Revolution
- Timelines of other cities in Iran: Bandar Abbas, Hamadan, Isfahan, Kerman, Mashhad, Qom, Shiraz, Tabriz, Yazd

== Bibliography ==
=== in English ===
- "Shah of Persia", Quarterly Review, no. 269, London: John Murray, pp. 258+, 1873, hdl:2027/njp.32101076533361. (includes brief description of Tehran)
- Edward Balfour (1885), "Teheran", Cyclopaedia of India (3rd ed.), London: B. Quaritch
- S.G.W. Benjamin (1885). "The City of Teheran". Century Magazine. 31 (2).
- Samuel Greene Wheeler Benjamin (1887), "The City of Teheran", Persia and the Persians, London: J. Murray
- George Nathaniel Curzon (1892), "Teheran", Persia and the Persian Question, London: Longmans, Green & Co., OCLC 3444074
- "Teheran", Chambers's Encyclopaedia, London: W. & R. Chambers, 1901, hdl:2027/njp.32101065312959
- "Teheran", Jewish Encyclopedia, vol. 12, New York, 1906, hdl:2027/mdp.49015002282441
- Abraham Valentine Williams Jackson (1906), "Tehran", Persia Past and Present: a Book of Travel and Research, New York: Macmillan
- Houtum-Schindler, Albert (1910). "Teheran (city)" . Encyclopædia Britannica. Vol. 26 (11th ed.). pp. 506–507.
- "Teheran", Russia with Teheran, Port Arthur, and Peking, Leipzig: K. Baedeker, 1914, OCLC 1328163
- "Teheran". Encyclopaedia of Islam. E.J. Brill. 1936. p. 713?+. ISBN 9004097961.
- Stephen L. McFarland (1985). "Anatomy of an Iranian Political Crowd: The Tehran Bread Riot of December 1942". International Journal of Middle East Studies. 17 (1): 51–65. doi:10.1017/S0020743800028762. JSTOR 163309. S2CID 153740042.
- Ferydoon Firoozi (1974). "Tehran: A Demographic and Economic Analysis". Middle Eastern Studies. 10 (1): 60–76. doi:10.1080/00263207408700263. JSTOR 4282511.
- Hushang Bahrambeygui (1977), Tehran: an urban analysis, Sahâb, OCLC 5672777
- Mansoureh Ettehadieh Nezam-Mafi. "Patterns in Urban Development: the Growth of Tehran (1852–1903)", in Edmund Bosworth and Carole Hillenbrand, eds., Qajar Iran: Political, Social and Cultural Change 1800–1925 (Costa Mesa: Mazda, 1992), pp. 199–212.
- Ali Madanipour. Tehran: The Making of a Metropolis (New York: John Wiley, 1998).
- Xavier de Planhol (2004). "Tehran". Encyclopædia Iranica.
- C. Edmund Bosworth, ed. (2007). "Tehran". Historic Cities of the Islamic World. Leiden: Koninklijke Brill. pp. 503–519. ISBN 978-9004153882.
- Michael R.T. Dumper; Bruce E. Stanley, eds. (2008), "Tehran", Cities of the Middle East and North Africa, Santa Barbara, USA: ABC-CLIO, pp. 348+, ISBN 9781576079195
- Aḥmad Monzawī; ʿAlī Naqī Monzawī (2012). "Bibliographies and Catalogues in Iran: Tehran". Encyclopædia Iranica.

=== in other languages ===
- Xavier de Planhol. "De la ville islamique à la métropole iranienne: quelques aspects du développement contemporain de Téhéran," dans Recherches sur la géographie humaine de l'Iran septentrional (in French) (Paris: 1964).
- Paul Vieille and K. Moheni, "Ecologie culturelle d'une ville islamique: Téhéran," Revue Géographique de l'Est 9:3–4 (1969): 315–359. (in French)
- Paul Vieille. Marché des terrains et société urbaine. Recherche sur la ville de Tehran (in French) (Paris: Anthropos, 1970).
- Bernard Hourcade [in French] (1974). "Téhéran: évolution récente d'une métropole". Méditerranée (in French). 16 – via Persée.
- Martin Seger [in German] (1975). "Strukturelemente der Stadt Teheran und das Modell der modernen orientalischen Stadt". Erdkunde (in German) (29). ISSN 0014-0015.
- Martin Seger (1978). Tehran: Eine stadtgeographische Studie (in German). Springer. ISBN 0387813683.
- Chahryar Adle; Bernard Hourcade, eds. (1992). Téhéran capitale bicentenaire. Bibliothèque Iranienne (in French and English). Paris: Institut français de recherche en Iran. ISBN 2-87723-055-4.
- Bernard Hourcade (2005). "L'émergence des banlieues de Téhéran". Cahiers d'études sur la Méditerranée orientale et le monde turco-iranien (in French) (24: Métropoles et métropolisation).
- Mina Saïdi-Sharouz, ed. (2013). Le Téhéran des quartiers populaires: Transformation urbaine et société civile en République islamique (in French). Paris: Éditions Karthala. ISBN 978-2-8111-0931-8.
