= Timeline of Qom =

The following is a timeline of the history of the city of Qom, Iran.

== Prior to 20th century ==
- 685 - Arab Shia refugees settle in Qom.
- 804/805 - Qom gains "administrative independence from Isfahan."
- 816 - Death of Fātimah bint Mūsā (sister of 8th Imam of Twelver Shia faith); shrine develops thereafter.
- 825 - Qom "attacked."
- 988 - Hasan ibn Muhammad Qumi writes Tarikh-i Qum (city history).
- 1050s - Hassan-i Sabbah born in Qom (approximate date).
- 1224 - City besieged by Mongol forces.
- 1393 - Timur in power.
- 1442 - City becomes seat of government of Timurid monarch Sultan Muhammad bin Baysonqor.
- 1447/1448 - City sacked by Qara Qoyunlu forces.
- 1469 - Ağ Qoyunlu in power.
- 1501 - Twelver Shia Islam declared official state religion in Iran, a development beneficial to Qom as a holy city (approximate date).
- 1722 - Qom sacked by Afghans.
- 1883 - "New court" built at the Fatima shrine.

== 20th century ==
- 1920 - Population: 30,000-40,000 (approximate estimate).
- 1922 - Qom Seminary (hawza) established.
- 1923 - Printing press in operation.
- 1950 - Population: 83,235 (estimate).
- 1960 - Population: 105,272 (estimate).
- 1963
  - Mar'ashi Najafi library established.
  - Religious leader Khomeini arrested and exiled.
- 1966 - Population: 134,292.
- 1974 - Mohemmat Sazi Football Club formed.
- 1975 - "Riots involving 'Muslim Marxists.'"
- 1976 - Population: 246,831.
- 1978 - 7–9 January: Iranian Revolution against Pahlavis begins in Qom.
- 1982 - Population: 424,000 (estimate).
- 1996
  - Center for the Revival of Islamic Heritage established.
  - Population: 777,677.
- 1999 - February: Local election held.

== 21st century ==
- 2008 - Yadegar-e Emam Stadium opens.
- 2009
  - December: Funeral of religious leader Hussein-Ali Montazeri.
  - Qom Monorail construction begins.
- 2011 - Population: 1,074,036.
- 2013 - 14 June: Local election held.
- 2014 - City becomes part of newly formed national administrative Region 1.
- 2020 - 19 February: The first two cases of COVID-19 were detected in Iran.

== See also ==
- Qom history
- History of Qom
- Category:Monuments in Qom (in Persian)
- Timelines of other cities in Iran: Bandar Abbas, Hamadan, Isfahan, Kerman, Mashhad, Shiraz, Tabriz, Tehran, Yazd

== Bibliography ==
=== in English ===
- George Nathaniel Curzon (1892). "(Kum)". Persia and the Persian Question. Vol. 2. London. pp. 6–12. hdl:2027/hvd.32044022702278.
- Albert Houtum-Schindler (1897). "Province of Kom". Eastern Persian Irak. London: J. Murray and Royal Geographical Society. pp. 56+. hdl:2027/mdp.39015000658461.
- "Kum" . Encyclopædia Britannica. Vol. 15 (11th ed.). 1910. p. 945.
- C. A. Storey (1936). "History of Persia: Qum". Persian Literature: a Bio-Bibliographical Survey. Vol. 1. London: Luzac & Company. OCLC 1312518.
- Laurence Lockhart (1960). Persian Cities. London. pp. 127–131. OCLC 1370385.
- Jean Calmard (1980). "Kum". In C. Edmund Bosworth; et al. (eds.). Encyclopaedia of Islam. Vol. 5 (2nd ed.). Brill. pp. 369–372. via Google Books
- W. Barthold (1984). "Isfahan, Kashan, and Qum". Historical Geography of Iran. Translated by Svat Soucek. Princeton University Press. pp. 178–179. ISBN 978-1-4008-5322-9.
- Ernst Hunziker (April 1994). "Qom: Holy City of the Mullahs". Swiss Review of World Affairs. Neue Zürcher Zeitung. ISSN 0039-7490.
- Noelle Watson, ed. (1996), "Qom", International Dictionary of Historic Places, Fitzroy Dearborn, pp. 600+, ISBN 9781884964039
- Andreas Drechsler (2005). "Tāriḵ-e Qom". Encyclopædia Iranica. (About city history written in 10th century)
- Michael R.T. Dumper; Bruce E. Stanley, eds. (2008), "Qom", Cities of the Middle East and North Africa, Santa Barbara, US: ABC-CLIO, pp. 301+, ISBN 9781576079195
- Andreas Drechsler (2009). "Qom: History to the Safavid Period". Encyclopædia Iranica. (Includes bibliography)
- Graeme Wood (2010), "Among the Mullahs", The Atlantic, US
- Aḥmad Monzawī; ʿAlī Naqī Monzawī (2012). "Bibliographies and Catalogues in Iran: Qom". Encyclopædia Iranica.

=== in other languages ===
- António Baião (1923). Itinerarios da India a Portugal por terra (in Portuguese). Coimbra – via Digital Library of India. (Includes information about Qom)
- Ḥasan ibn Muḥammad Qummī (1934). Jalāl al-Dīn Ṭihrānī (ed.). Tarikh-i Qumm (in Persian). Tehran. OCLC 54247737. (Written in 10th century in Arabic)
- Fredy Bemont (1969). Les Villes de l'Iran (in French). Paris. pp. 179–182. OCLC 489929494.
- Hossein Modarressi Tabataba'i (1971), Qom dar qarn-e nohom-e hejri, 801-900 (in Persian), Qom, OCLC 21745342
- Marcel Bazin (1973). "Qom, ville de pèlerinage et centre régional". Revue Géographique de l'Est (in French). 13 (1–2). ISSN 0035-3213 – via Persée.
- M. Tabataba’i. Turbat-i Pākān [Monuments and buildings of Qom], 2 vols (Qom, 1976)
- Andreas Drechsler (1999), Geschichte der Stadt Qom im Mittelalter (650-1350): politische und wirtschaftliche Aspekte, Islamkundliche Untersuchungen (in German), Berlin: Klaus Schwarz Verlag, ISBN 3879972761 – via Martin-Luther-Universität Halle-Wittenberg, Universitäts- und Landesbibliothek Sachsen-Anhalt Menadoc
- Djamileh Zia (2011). "Qom, la plus ancienne ville chiite de l'Iran". La Revue de Téhéran (in French) (72).
