= Timeline of Bandar Abbas =

The following is a timeline of the history of the city of Bandar Abbas, Iran.

== Prior to 20th century ==
- 1514 – Portuguese in power; settlement named "Comorão".
- 1614 – Shah Abbas the Great expels the Portuguese.
- 1622
  - Settlement renamed "Bandar Abbas".
  - Bandar Abbas economy affected by capture of nearby Hormuz by Persian/English forces.
- 1623 – Dutch East India Company trade mission established.
- 1664 – French East India Company conducts business in town (approximate date).
- 1727 – Town sacked by Afghan forces.
- 1741 – "Cannon foundry" established.
- 1762 – British and Dutch businesspeople relocate to Bushire.
- 1790s – Population: 12,000 (approximate estimate).
- 1793 – Bandar Abbas "leased to the sultan of Oman" (approximate date).
- 1830 – Population: 5,000 (approximate estimate).
- 1852 – Persians expelled the Muscat authorities.
- 1868 – Salim bin Thuwaini expelled and Qajars in power.
- 1872 – Gwadur-Jask-Bandar Abbas telegraph begins operating (approximate date).
- 1879 – مسجد گله‌داری (mosque) built.
- 1892 – مسجد صحراباغی (mosque) built.
- 1900 – Population: 10,000. (approximate estimate).

== 20th century ==
- 1902 – Earthquake.
- 1925 – مسجد ناصری (بندر عباس) (mosque) built.
- 1930s – Population: 8,000 (approximate estimate).
- 1947 – "Fish canning plant" built.
- 1956 – Population: 17,710.
- 1959 – حمام گله‌داری (bath house) refurbished.
- 1966 – Population: 34,627.
- 1967 – Deepwater port opens.
- 1973 – "Iranian naval headquarters" relocated to Bandar Abbas from Khorramshahr.
- 1976 – Population: 89,103.
- 1982 – Population: 175,000 (estimate).
- 1988 – 3 July: United States military shoots down civilian Iran Air Flight 655 in vicinity of Bandar Abbas during the Iran–Iraq War.
- 1996 – Population: 273,578.

== 21st century ==
- 2006 – Aluminium Hormozgan F.C. (football club) formed.
- 2008
  - 10 September: 2008 Qeshm earthquake.
  - موزه مردم شناسی خلیج فارس (museum) opens.
- 2010 – Takhti Stadium (Bandar Abbas) opens.
- 2011 – Population: 435,751.
- 2013
  - June: Local election held.
  - Abbas Aminizadeh becomes mayor.
- 2014 – City becomes part of newly formed national administrative Region 2.
- 2021 - 2021 Hormozgan earthquakes
- 2022 - 2022 Hormozgan earthquakes

== See also ==
- Bandar Abbas history
- Other names of Bandar Abbas
- List of mayors of Bandar Abbas
- Hormozgan Province history
- Timelines of other cities in Iran: Hamadan, Isfahan, Kerman, Mashhad, Qom, Shiraz, Tabriz, Tehran, Yazd

== Bibliography ==
- William Milburn; Thomas Thornton (1825). "Gulph of Persia: Gombroon, or Bender Abassi". Oriental Commerce. London: Kingsbury, Parbury, and Allen.
- J. R. Wellsted (1840), "(Gambrun)", Travels to the City of the Caliphs, along the Shores of the Persian Gulf and the Mediterranean, London: H. Colburn, OCLC 5395027
- James Horsburgh (1852). "Persian Gulf: Bunder Abbas". India Directory: Or, Directions for Sailing to and from the East Indies, China, Australia, and the Interjacent Ports of Africa and South America (6th ed.). London: William H. Allen & Co. – via Google Books.
- Lewis Pelly (1864). "Visit to Lingah, Kishm and Bunder Abbass". Journal of the Royal Geographical Society. 34: 251–258. hdl:2027/uc1.$b530482 – via HathiTrust.
- Edward Balfour (1885), "Bandar Abbas", Cyclopaedia of India (3rd ed.), London: B. Quaritch, hdl:2027/mdp.39015068610990
- Arthur W. Stiffe (1900). "Ancient Trading Centres of the Persian Gulf. VI. Bandar Abbas". Geographical Journal. 16 (2): 211–215. Bibcode:1900GeogJ..16..211S. doi:10.2307/1774559. hdl:2027/inu.30000099853925. JSTOR 1774559.
- John Gordon Lorimer (1908). "Abbas (Bandar)". Gazetteer of the Persian Gulf. Calcutta: Superintendent Government Printing, India. hdl:2027/uc1.31158009868174.
- Houtum-Schindler, Albert (1910). "Bander Abbāsi" . Encyclopædia Britannica. Vol. 3 (11th ed.). pp. 311–312.
- "Bandar Abbas". Persian Gulf Pilot. Washington DC: Government Printing Office. 1920.
- Xavier de Planhol (1988). "Bandar Abbas: the City". Encyclopædia Iranica.
- Shabnam Holliday (2008), "Bandar Abbas", in Michael R.T. Dumper; Bruce E. Stanley (eds.), Cities of the Middle East and North Africa, Santa Barbara, USA: ABC-CLIO, pp. 69+, ISBN 9781576079195
