= Timeline of Isfahan =

The following is a timeline of the history of the city of Isfahan, Iran.

== Prior to 16th century ==
- 771 - Friday Mosque established in Yahudiyya (approximate date).
- 1051 - Isfahan besieged by Seljuk forces of Tughril; city becomes capital of the Seljuk Empire.
- 1070 - Nizamiyya Madrasa built (approximate date).
- 1107 - Chihil Dukhtaran (minaret) erected.
- 1194 - Khwarazmian Ala ad-Din Tekish in power.
- 1226 - City sacked by Mongol forces.
- 1228 - City besieged by Mongol forces again.
- 1240/1241 - Isfahan taken by Mongol forces.
- 1325 - Emamzadeh Jafar (tomb/shrine) built.
- 1341/1342 - Shaikh Abu Esḥāq Inju becomes governor of Isfahan.
- 1356 - Amir Mobārez-al-Din Mo-ḥammad Moẓaffari becomes governor of Isfahan.
- 1387 - Isfahan besieged by forces of Timur.

== 16th–19th centuries ==
- 1503 - Safavid Ismail I in power.
- 1598 - Isfahan becomes capital of the Safavid Empire; Abbas the Great in power.
- 1602
  - Si-o-se-pol (bridge) built to newly developed New Julfa.
  - Maydān-e Shāh (square) laid out.
- 1606 - Vank Cathedral established
- 1619 - Sheikh Lotfollah Mosque built.
- 1627 - Armenian Bedkhem Church built in New Julfa.
- 1630 - Shah Mosque built (approximate date).
- 1647 - Chehel Sotoun palace construction begins.
- 1650 - Khaju Bridge built.
- 1655 - Joubi Bridge built
- 1660 - Ali Qapu (palace) built (approximate date).
- 1670 - Hasht Behesht palace built.
- 1680 - Population: 500.000
- 1722 - Siege of Isfahan by Afghan forces.
- 1736 - Persian capital relocated from Isfahan to Mashhad.
- 1804/1805 - Famine.
- 1836/1837 - Unrest.
- 1848/1849 - Unrest.
- 1869 - Isfahan's economy affected by the opening of the Suez Canal in Egypt.
- 1872 - Famine.
- 1874 - Mass'oud Mirza Zell-e Soltan becomes governor of Isfahan.
- 1882 - Population: 73,634.

== 20th century ==
- 1919 - Zaban-e Zanan women's magazine begins publication.
- 1946 - University of Isfahan established.
- 1953 - Sepahan F.C. (football club) formed.
- 1959 - Hamadāniān cement factory in business.
- 1970s - Polyacryl Iran Corporation established.^{(en)}
- 1971 - Āryāmehr steel mill begins operating near city.
- 1973 - Naghsh-e-Jahan Derby (football contest) begins.
- 1977 - Ali Qapu, Chehel Sotoun, and Hasht Behesht palaces restored.
- 1977 - Isfahan University of Technology established.
- 1979 - Naqsh-e Jahan Square designated a UNESCO World Heritage Site.
- 1984 - Isfahan International Airport opens.

== 21st century ==
- 2003 - Naghsh-e Jahan Stadium opens.
- 2014 - City becomes part of newly formed national administrative Region 2.
- 2015 - Isfahan Metro begins operating.
- 2023 - 2023 Iran drone attacks occur.
- 2024
  - 19 April: Isfahan struck by Israeli missiles.
  - Chambers of Commerce of Asia Cooperation Dialogue held.

== See also ==
- Isfahan history (fr)
- Other names of Isfahan
- List of mayors of Isfahan (fa)
- List of historical structures in Isfahan Province
- Timelines of other cities in Iran: Bandar Abbas, Hamadan, Kerman, Mashhad, Qom, Shiraz, Tabriz, Tehran, Yazd

== Bibliography ==
=== in English ===
Published prior to 19th century

- Charles Wilson, ed. (1895), "Isfahan", Handbook for Travellers in Asia Minor, Transcaucasia, Persia, etc., London: John Murray, ISBN 9780524062142, OCLC 8979039, archived from the original on 29 June 2023

Published in the 20th century

- "Ispahan", Jewish Encyclopedia, vol. 6, New York, 1904, hdl:2027/mdp.49015002282268, archived from the original on 29 June 2023
- Guy Le Strange (1905). "Jibal: (Isfahan)". Lands of the Eastern Caliphate. Cambridge University Press.
- Houtum-Schindler, Albert; Rawlinson, Henry Creswicke (1910). "Isfahān" . Encyclopædia Britannica. Vol. 14 (11th ed.). pp. 867–870.
- Huart (1927). "Iṣfahān". In M.T. Houtsma; et al. (eds.). Encyclopaedia of Islam. Brill.
- C. A. Storey (1936). "History of Persia: Isfahan". Persian Literature: a Bio-Bibliographical Survey. Vol. 1. London: Luzac & Company. OCLC 1312518.
- Wilfred Blunt (1966). Isfahan: Pearl of Persia. OCLC 711992.
- Renata Holod, ed. (1974), Studies on Isfahan, Iranian Studies, OCLC 4762427
- John E. Woods (1977). "Note on the Mongol Capture of Iṣfahān". Journal of Near Eastern Studies. 36 (1): 49–51. doi:10.1086/372531. JSTOR 544126. S2CID 161867404.
- W. Barthold (1984). "Isfahan, Kashan, and Qum". An Historical Geography of Iran. Translated by Svat Soucek. Princeton University Press. pp. 169–179. ISBN 978-1-4008-5322-9.
- Eckart Ehlers. "Capitals and spatial organization in Iran: Esfahân, Shirâz, Tehran," in Chahryar Adle and Bernard Hourcade, eds., Téhéran: Capitale bicentenaire, (Paris and Teheran: Institut Français de Recherche en Iran, 1992), pp. 155–172.
- Andrew Petersen (1996). "Isfahan". Dictionary of Islamic Architecture. Routledge. ISBN 978-1-134-61365-6. Archived from the original on 29 June 2023.
- Noelle Watson, ed. (1996), "Esfahan", International Dictionary of Historic Places, Fitzroy Dearborn, ISBN 9781884964039, archived from the original on 29 June 2023
- Stephen P. Blake. Half the World: A Social Architecture of Safavid Isfahan, 1590-1722 (Costa Mesa, Cal.: Mazda, 1999)
- Heidi Walcher (2000). "Face of the Seven Spheres: Urban Morphology and Architecture in Nineteenth-century Isfahan". Iranian Studies. 33 (3/4): 327–347. doi:10.1080/00210860008701985. JSTOR 4311377. S2CID 144016605. + part 2 Archived 2017-02-07 at the Wayback Machine, 2001

Published in the 21st century

- Philip Mattar, ed. (2004), "Isfahan", Encyclopedia of the Modern Middle East and North Africa, NY: Macmillan Reference USA – via Global Issues In Context
- Josef W. Meri, ed. (2006). "Isfahan". Medieval Islamic Civilization: an Encyclopedia. Routledge. ISBN 978-0-415-96691-7. Archived from the original on 29 June 2023.
- Jürgen Paul [in German] (2006). "Isfahan: Local Historiography". Encyclopædia Iranica. Archived from the original on 15 March 2017.
- Sussan Babaie (2007). "Isfahan: Monuments: Bibliography". Encyclopædia Iranica. Archived from the original on 15 March 2017.
- C. Edmund Bosworth, ed. (2007). "Isfahan". Historic Cities of the Islamic World. Leiden: Koninklijke Brill. pp. 167–179. ISBN 978-9004153882. Archived from the original on 29 June 2023.
- Sussan Babaie. Isfahan and Its Palaces: Statecraft, Shiʿism, and the Architecture of Conviviality in early modern Iran. Edinburgh: Edinburgh University Press, 2008
- Heidi A. Walcher (2008). In the Shadow of the King: Zill al-Sultān and Isfahān under the Qājārs. I.B. Tauris. ISBN 9781850434344.
- David Durand-Guédy (2010). Iranian Elites and Turkish Rulers: A History of Iṣfahān in the Saljūuq Period. Routledge. ISBN 9780415457101.
- Habib Borjian (2012). "Isfahan: Modern Economy And Industries: Isfahan City". Encyclopædia Iranica. Archived from the original on 8 February 2017.
- Masashi Haneda; Rudi Matthee (2012). "Isfahan: Safavid Period". Encyclopædia Iranica. Archived from the original on 17 May 2018.
- Hossein Kamaly (2012). "Isfahan: Medieval Period". Encyclopædia Iranica. Archived from the original on 27 December 2012.
- Aḥmad Monzawī; ʿAlī Naqī Monzawī (2012). "Bibliographies and Catalogues in Iran: Isfahan". Encyclopædia Iranica. Archived from the original on 14 February 2017.
- Habibollah Zanjani (2012). "Isfahan: Population: Isfahan City". Encyclopædia Iranica. Archived from the original on 8 December 2015.
- Kheirandish, Elaheh. Baghdad and Isfahan: A Dialogue of Two Cities in an Age of Science CA. 750-1750 (Harvard UP, 2021) excerpt Archived 2023-06-01 at the Wayback Machine

=== in other languages ===
- Abu'l-Šayḵ ʿAbd-Allāh b. Moḥammad, Ṭabaqāt al-moḥaddeṯin be-Eṣfahān wa'l-wāredin ʿalayhā (in Arabic) (Biographical dictionary written in 10th century CE)
- Mafarrukhi, Maḥāsen Eṣfahān (in Arabic) (Written in 11th century CE)
- Abu Noʿaym Eṣfahāni, Ḏekr akbār Eṣfahān (in Arabic) (Biographical dictionary written in 11th century CE)
- Jean-Baptiste Tavernier (1676). "Description d'Ispahan ville capitale des Estats du Roy de Perse". Les Six Voyages (in French). Paris. Archived from the original on 29 June 2023.
- Jean Chardin (1811) [1686]. "(Ispahan)". Voyages du chevalier Chardin en Perse (in French). Vol. 7. Paris. pp. 289+. hdl:2027/nyp.33433082406509. Archived from the original on 29 June 2023.
- Claude Anet (1906). "Une semaine a Ispahan". La Perse en automobile: à travers la Russie et le Caucase (in French). Paris: Félix Juven. pp. 233+.
- Sayyid Ali Al-Jinab. al-Iṣfahān (in Persian). circa 1920s?
- André Godard (1937). "Isfahan". Āthār-é Īrān / Annales du Service archéologique de l'Iran (in French) (2): 7–176. OCLC 3230219.
- Helga Anschütz [in German] (1967). "Persische Stadttypen. Eine vergleichende Betrachtung der Städte Teheran - Isfahan - Abadan - Chorramschahr, und Buschir in Iran". Geografische Rundschau (in German). 19. ISSN 0016-7460.
- H. Gaube and E. Wirth. Der Bazar von Isfahan, Tübinger Atlas des Vorderen Orients, Beihefte B/22, Wiesbaden, 1978.
- Rosemarie Quiring-Zoche (1980). Isfahan im 15. und 16. Jahrhundert: Ein Beitrag zur persischen Stadtgeschichte. Islamkundliche Untersuchungen (in German). Berlin: Klaus Schwarz Verlag.
- Quaderni del Seminario di iranistica dell'Università di Venezia (in Italian), 1981 (Special issue on Isfahan)
