= Timeline of Yazd =

The following is a timeline of the history of the city of Yazd, Iran.

== Prior to 20th century ==
- 749 - Abu-Moslem Khorasani in power.
- 1051 - Kakuyid Faramurz in power.
- 1070 - Ali ibn Faramurz in power (approximate date).
- 1119 - Masjed-e ʿAtiq (Friday Mosque) built by ʿAlāʿ-al-Dawla Garšāsp.
- 1141 - Atabegs of Yazd in power.
- 1228/1229 - Mahmud Shah in power.
- 1271/1272 - Ala al-Dawla in power.
- 1274/1275 - Flood.
- 14th century CE - Muin al-Din Yazdi writes history of Yazd.
- 1307/1308 - Duvazdah Imam (tomb) built.
- 1318 - Muzaffarid Mubariz al-Din Muhammad becomes governor.
- 1320 - Shah Kamal madrasa built.
- 1324 - Jame Mosque of Yazd built.
- 1325
  - Madrasa-ye Rokniya built.
  - Italian traveller Odoric of Pordenone visits city.
- 1346/1347 - City walls expanded.
- 1365 - Tomb of Šams-al-Din Moḥammad built (approximate date).
- 1368/1369 - Masjed-e Rig (mosque) built.
- 1385/1386 - Mosque of Ḵᵛāja Ḥāji Abu’l-Maʿāli built.
- 1395 - Fortifications built.
- 15th century CE - Historians Ahmad ibn Husain Ali Katib and Jafar ibn Muhammad ibn Hasan Jafari each write histories of Yazd.
- 1405/1406 - Iskandar b. Umar Shaykh becomes governor.
- 1421/1422 - Bazaar built near Mehriz gate.
- 1456 - Flood.
- 1457 - Haji-Qanbar Bazaar built.
- 1720s - Ghalzai Afghans in power.
- 1742/1743 - Mirza Husayn becomes governor.
- 1747 - Mohammad Taqi Khan becomes governor (until 1798).

== 20th century ==
- 1903 - Anti-Baháʼí unrest.
- 1920 - Population: 45,000 (approximate estimate).
- 1931 - Factory in business.
- 1935 - Pahlavi Street constructed.
- 1940 - Yazd Ateshkade (Zoroastrian building) opens.
- 1976 - City Hall built.
- 1982 - Population: 193,000 (estimate).
- 1986 - Population: 234,003.
- 1991 - Shahid Ghandi Yazd (football club) formed.
- 1996 - Population: 326,776.

== 21st century ==
- 2004 - Foolad Yazd F.C. (football club) formed.
- 2009 - Yazd Solar Power Station commissioned near city.
- 2011 - Population: 486,152.
- 2013 - 14 June: Local election held.
- 2014 - Tarbiat Yazd F.C. (football club) active.
- 2026 - 7 April - City hit by several strikes around dawn.

== See also ==
- Yazd history (fa)
- List of mayors of Yazd
- Timelines of other cities in Iran: Bandar Abbas, Hamadan, Isfahan, Kerman, Mashhad, Qom, Shiraz, Tabriz, Tehran

== Bibliography ==
=== in English ===
- Edward Balfour (1885), "Yezd", Cyclopaedia of India (3rd ed.), London: B. Quaritch, hdl:2027/mdp.39015068611022
- N. Malcolm (1905). Five Years in a Persian Town.
- "Yezd (city)" . Encyclopædia Britannica. Vol. 28 (11th ed.). 1910. p. 919.
- Clément Huart (1936). "Yazd". Encyclopædia of Islam. Leiden: E.J. Brill. p. 1161. via Google Books
- C. E. Bosworth (1970). "Dailamīs in Central Iran: The Kākūyids of Jibāl and Yazd". Iran. 8. British Institute of Persian Studies: 73–95. doi:10.2307/4299634. JSTOR 4299634.
- Michael Edward Bonnie (1980), Yazd and its Hinterland, Marburger Geographische Schriften, Universität Marburg
- Michael E. Bonine (1987). "Islam and Commerce: Waqf and the Bazaar of Yazd, Iran". Erdkunde. 41 (3): 182–196. ISSN 0014-0015. JSTOR 25645162.
- Isabel Miller (1989). "Local History in Ninth/Fifteenth Century Yaẓd: The 'Tārākh-i Jadīd-i Yazd'". Iran. 27. British Institute of Persian Studies: 75–79. doi:10.2307/4299819. JSTOR 4299819.
- A. K. S. Lambton (1992). "Qanāts of Yazd". Journal of the Royal Asiatic Society. 2, 3rd series (1): 21–35. doi:10.1017/S1356186300001784. JSTOR 25182446. S2CID 162258668. (History of qanat water technology in the city)
- Noelle Watson, ed. (1996), "Yazd", International Dictionary of Historic Places, Fitzroy Dearborn, pp. 720+, ISBN 9781884964039
- Nile Green (2000). "Survival of Zoroastrianism in Yazd". Iran. 38. British Institute of Persian Studies: 115–122. doi:10.2307/4300587. JSTOR 4300587.
- Ali Modarres (2006). Modernizing Yazd: Selective Historical Memory and the Fate of Vernacular Architecture. Bibliotheca Iranica. Mazda Publishers. ISBN 978-1-56859-140-7.
- C. Edmund Bosworth, ed. (2007). "Yazd". Historic Cities of the Islamic World. Leiden: Koninklijke Brill. pp. 557–566. ISBN 978-9004153882.
- Ali Modarres (2012). "On Politics and the Morphology of the Bazaar in Yazd". In Mohammad Gharipour (ed.). The Bazaar in the Islamic City: Design, Culture, and History. American University in Cairo. pp. 251–274. ISBN 978-977-416-529-0.
- Aḥmad Monzawī; ʿAlī Naqī Monzawī (2012). "Bibliographies and Catalogues in Iran: Yazd". Encyclopædia Iranica.

=== in other languages ===
- Albert Houtum-Schindler; Heinrich Kiepert (1881). "Reisen im Südlichen Persien 1879". Zeitschrift der Gesellschaft für Erdkunde zu Berlin (in German). 16. Dietrich Reimer Verlag: 319+. "(Yezd)"
- Mahmud Mahini (1934). Jughrafiya-yi Tarikhi-yi Yazd [Historical Geography of Yazd] (in Persian).
- ʻAbd al-Ḥusayn Āyatī (1938). Kitāb-i Tārīkh-i Yazd (in Persian). OCLC 123446613.
- Jaʿfar b. Moḥammad Jaʿfārī (1960), Iraj Afshar (ed.), Tārīḵ-e Yazd (in Persian), Tehran, OCLC 776485057 (Written in 15th century CE)
- Iraj Afshar. Yādgārhā-ye Yazd [Monuments of Yazd] (in Persian). Tehran. 1969-1975 (3 volumes)
- Iraj Afshar (1992). Yazd Nameh (in Persian). Tehran.
- Ahmad ibn Husayn ibn 'Ali al-Kateb (2007), Tarikh-i-jedid-i-Yazd [New History of Yazd] (in Persian), Tehran, ISBN 978-9640010655 (Written in 15th century CE?)
