= Timeline of Shiraz =

The following is a timeline of the history of the city of Shiraz, Iran.

== Prior to 14th century ==
- ca.2000 BC – A settlement of the Iranian people is located at or near the current site of the city. Clay tablets referring to this settlements were found in the 1970s.
- ca.1000 BC – The growth of the settlements particularly near the rivers flowing in the area leads to development of a regional power structure among the local tribes. The Medes rotary their rise to power
- ca.750 BC – Cambyses I sets the foundations of the first Persian empire.
- ca.650 BC – Cyrus, son of Cambyses I, defeats all local, regional, and continental wide kingdoms. He forms the Achaemenid empire extending from North Africa and the Mediterranean to India and western China. It encompasses the largest percentage of earth's population under one rule. A record that has never been broken to present day.
- 640–653 CE – Fārs falls to the Arab armies of Umar. Shiraz in 641. Estakhr in 653.
- 693 CE - Shiraz founded by Mahommed b. Yusuf Thakefi.
- 650–869 – Seat of the Arab government of Fārs. Controlled from Baghdad with very limited Persian activity. Other towns in the region decline as Shiraz grows with new immigrants. Turkish tribes are brought to the region to serve as soldiers in the Arab army. Descendants of these tribes form ruling dynasties of the region in the next several centuries.
- 790 – Shiraz scholar Sibawayh publishes his writings. This is the first formal basis of Arabic Grammar.
- 9th C. – Shiraz wine is praised as the best of the Middle East.
- 869 – Saffarid dynasty leader Ya'qub ibn al-Layth al-Saffar liberates Shiraz. Abbasid Caliphate rule weakened. Many Arabs and Turks in the city are eliminated but a significant number choose to stay in Shiraz, as they have adopted Persian culture.
- 894 – Jameh Mosque of Atigh built by Amr ibn al-Layth, Yaqub's brother.
- 933 – Shiraz is capital for the Buyid dynasty. Becomes cultural center under Emad Doleh, the first Buyid amir.
- 937 – Buyids eventually bring down the Abbasid Caliphate and Shiraz gains international prominence. Literature, science, art and culture are promoted. Religious minorities are treated well. Christaians, Jews and Zoroastrians are among the ministers and consultants of the Buyid amirs.
- ca.950 – Subterranean canal made in the mountains to bring fresh water to the city by Rukn al-Dawla, Emmad's brother. The stream, called Ab-e Rokni, still runs today, and is immortalized in poetry of Shiraz.
- ca.1000 – First wall built around Shiraz due to attacks by Seljuk Turks. The Seljuks were supported by the Damascus-based remainder of the Abbasid Caliphate, against the Buyids.
- ca.1010 – Over the next 50 years this war, as well as internal feuds among the Buyids destroys much of the city.
- 1062 – City is eventually captured by Seljuks, However, to the dismay of the Abbasid Caliphate, the new rulers quickly adopt the Persian culture and many settle in Shiraz. The Seljuks actually become great patrons of Persian art and culture, as they build a great empire.
- ca.1075 – Shiraz is rebuilt to splendor by Seljuk Attabak Jalal-ed-din and his sons. Development attracts new immigrants from all corners of Persia, as well as Central Asia.
- 1090 – Revolts within the Seljuk army are prompted and supported by Damascuss and Baghdad as the First Crusade weakens the Seljuk military might, and empire. Successful rebels in Shiraz are the Songhorid Turks.
- 1100 – Shiraz becomes capital of the Songhorid dynasty of Turkish origin (Attabak-ane Fars).
- 1100 – Although they promote Sunni Islam on behalf of Baghdad, the Songhorid also eventually become die hard Persians. They settle in and rebuild Shiraz as their home.
- 1105 – A wall is restored to encircles the city with Eight gates. Influence of the Abbasid Caliphate is contained to mostly ceremonial terms.
- ca.1110 – Sunni Muslims rule the region from Shiraz. Although Judaism, Christianity and Zoroastrianism are still freely practiced among a large minority in the city and the region. This tolerance promotes another migration wave into the city and the region. Many tribes of Turkish and Cacauss regions move to Shiraz, and surrounding areas. Many still live in the region (Qashqai, Lurs).
- ca.1115 – Shiraz is a center of the pious and the Jurists of the nation. Number of religious shrines are built, many of which are still standing, among them: Masjid Atiq, Masjid Now.
- 1170 – Ruzbihan Baqli (1128–1209), establishes own Sufi sect in Shiraz.
- 1150–1195 – Decline of Shiraz as dynastic feuds among the various ruling tribes and a famine ruin the city.
- 1195 – Saad ibn Zangi, a local Attabak, establishes rule and restores the city.
- 1210 – Future poet Saadi Shirazi born in Shiraz (approximate date).
- 1280 – Shiraz saved from Mongol invasion by diplomacy of Abu Bakr ibn Saad. Genghis Khan is so enamoured by the Persian ruler that names him Ktlug Khan and considers him a friend.
- 1281 – Grave site of Ahmad-ibn-Musa (son of the 7th imam of the shiites) is identified by Amir Moqarrab-alDin a Vazir of Abu Bakr, during excavation for a palace.
- 1282 – A shrine is built on the grave site. Today it is the holiest Muslim site in the city and the region, (Shah Cheragh).
- 1284 – Decline of Shiraz due to the high Taxes imposed by Mongols. Corruption and feuds resume.
- 1287 – Drought and Famine kills approximately 100,000 people in Shiraz.
- 1291 – Saadi Shirazi dies and is buried in his garden next to an artesian well. Currently the beautiful gardens are a major tourist attraction, with a still flowing well and stream next to Saadi's tomb.
- 1297 – Measles and Plague kill another 50,000 people in Shiraz and surrounding area.
- 1297 – Female ruler Abish and her daughter Kurdujin save lives and the city by their charitable foundations. They were Salghurids who had married into the Mongols.

== 14th–19th centuries ==
- 1304 – Injuids dynasty takes over and rebuild Shiraz, but their in-fighting eventually causes more destruction.
- 1325
  - Future poet Hafez born in Shiraz.
  - Ilkhanate period. Their rule is marked by warfare and destruction.
- 1353 – The Muzaffarid dynasty captures Shiraz. Once again Shiraz is the capital for Persia.
- ca.1350 – Traveller Ibn Battuta visits Shiraz and documents a great city, rich with gardens, streams, bazaars, and cleanly clothed people.
- 1357 – Muzaffarid Shah Shuja takes reign and revives the city.
- 1360 – Hafiz (1310–1380) is patronized by Shah Shuja and settles in Bage-Mossalla where he establishes a great following. His tomb in the same garden is a revered and major tourist attraction for world travellers and Iranians alike.
- 1382 – Shah Shuja gives Timur's army with gifts and saves the city from Pillage again.
- 1384 – After the death of Shah Shuja in-fighting flares up among the Muzaffarids and leads to several battles in Shiraz and eventual city decline.
- 1387 – Shirāz is occupied for a short period by Timur.
- 1393 – Timur occupies Shirāz for the second time and spent a month there "rejoicing and feasting". He appoints his grandson who has adopted the Persian culture as governor. Rebuilding of the city resumes.
- 1400 – Shiraz is known as the city of Saadi and Hafez. Their tombs, still intact today, become shrines.
- 1410 – Shiraz prospers with a population of 200,000. For a few years it is the capital of the Turkmen Aq Qoyunlu rulers.
- 1470 – Mongols and Turkmen, the invaders, are soon ousted from the city.
- 1503 – Saffavid ruler Shah Ismaeel captures Shiraz and kills or exiles most Sunni leaders to promote Shiism.
- 1550 – Allah-verdi Khan and his son Emam-Qoli-Khan governors of the Saffavid rebuild city.
- 1575 – Shiite followers grow in numbers, schools and shrines are built. Many are still standing, Madrese Khan.
- ca.1590 – Period of relative prosperity. Arts flourish. Shiraz artists and craftsmen are famous and utilized worldwide. See Taj Mahal
- ca.1600 – Shiraz wine discovered by the British and reported to be one of the best in the world.
- 1621 – British and French merchants frequent the city. Grapes are taken to Europe.
- 1630 – A flood destroys large parts of the town.
- 1634 – Mulla Sadra, a well known philosopher from Shiraz is prosecuted for heretical writings and opinions. He promotes the idea of a free thinking Moslem and writes against the practice of blindly following the edicts of the clergy (Thaghlid).
- 1668 – Another flood hits Shirāz.
- 1724 – Shirāz is sacked by Afghan invaders.
- 1744 – Nader Shah of the Afsharid dynasty captures Shiraz. Large sections of the city destroyed during wars.
- 1747–1800 – Three way power struggle in Iran between Afsharid dynasty, Zand, and the Qajars
- 1750s
  - Karim Khan Zand moves to Shiraz and takes the title People's Representative, (Vakil-ol-Roaya). He establishes the Zand Dynasty.
  - Shirāz becomes capital of the Zand dynasty. City is rebuilt. Structured into 11 quarters (10 Muslim and one Jewish). Huge moat and wall surround the city, with six gates. Culture, Arts and minorities flourish.
- 1794 – End of the Zand dynasty, and Shirāz' status as capital.
- 1794 – Shiraz captured by Agha Mohammad Khan Qajar, pillaged and destroyed.
- 1800 – Decline of the city under the Qajar dynasty
- 1822 – Plague and Cholera epidemics kill thousands.
- 1824 – An earthquake destroys parts of the town.
- 1830 – Plague of locusts destroys the crops, local agriculture and creates famine. Tens of thousands die and many more move out of the city. Population decreases to only about 19000 by diseases and outmigration.
- 1844 – A young merchant, Sayyid `Alí Muhammad and given the title of 'The Báb' (Arabic, meaning 'The Gate'), declared His Messianic mission and founded the Bábí Faith.
- 1853 – Another major earthquake hits Shirāz.
- 1860 – British influence prevails in southern Iran and Shiraz. The British are actively opposed by the native Qashqai tribes in the mountains outside the city.
- 1869 – Shiraz economy affected by opening of the Suez Canal in Egypt.
- 1872 – Fars newspaper begins publication.
- 1880 – Qavam family suppresses local unrests with the help of the British Indian Rifelmen.
- 1883 – First official census shows a population of 53,607.

== 20th century ==
- 1903 - Becomes the residence of a British consul.
- 1907 – Sur-e Esrafil, a widely circulated newspaper published in Shiraz by Mirza Jahangir Khan Shirazi, supports the Persian Constitutional Revolution. Qashqai leaders support Mirza Jahangir Khan in revolt against the government.
- 1908 – Mirza Jahangir Khan is executed and his paper shut down.
- 1910 – Shiraz blood libel: local people destroy the entire Jewish quarter during a pogrom
- 1911 – Seyyed Zia'eddin Tabatabaee, a local shiite leader publishes newspaper Banaye-Islam with the help of the British consulate in Shiraz.
- 1913 – The Fars newspaper begins publication.
- 1918 – Qashqai tribesmen with leader Naser Khan besiege the city. Central government power declines in Iran. British influence increases with the discovery of oil. They help local associates to suppress tribal revolts throughout the region.
- 1919 – Influenza epidemic kills 10,000. Iran is falling apart with Russian and British invasions from the north and south respectively. Shiraz belongs to the British.
- 1921 – Qajar dynasty ends. Reza Shah Pahlavi takes over, with Seyyed Zia'eddin Tabatabaee at his side.
- 1945 – Shiraz University opens.
- 1962 – Pahlavi University founded.
- 1963 – Population: 229,761 (estimate).
- 1967 – Shiraz Cultural Festival begins.
- 1982 – Population: 800,000 (estimate).
- 1996 – Population: 1,053,025.

== 21st century ==
- 2005 – Census reports show a population of 1,255,955.
- 2011 – Population: 1,460,665.
- 2013 – 14 June: Local election held.
- 2014
  - City becomes part of newly formed national administrative Region 2.
  - Shiraz Metro officially commenced operations.

== See also ==
- History of Shiraz
- Timeline of Shiraz (in Russian)
- List of mayors of Shiraz
- History of Fars province
- Timelines of other cities in Iran: Bandar Abbas, Hamadan, Isfahan, Kerman, Mashhad, Qom, Tabriz, Tehran, Yazd

== Bibliography ==
- William Francklin (1790). Observations Made on a Tour from Bengal to Persia in the Years 1786-7. London: Printed for T. Cadell. (includes information about "Shirauz")
- Josiah Conder (1830), "Shiraz", Persia and China, Modern Traveller, London: James Duncan, OCLC 8888382
- Edward Balfour (1885), "Shiraz", Cyclopaedia of India (3rd ed.), London: B. Quaritch
- Charles Wilson, ed. (1895), "Shiraz", Handbook for Travellers in Asia Minor, Transcaucasia, Persia, etc., London: J. Murray, ISBN 9780524062142, OCLC 8979039
- A.V. Williams Jackson (1906), "Shiraz", Persia Past and Present: a Book of Travel and Research, New York: Macmillan
- Houtum-Schindler, Albert (1910). "Shiraz" . Encyclopædia Britannica. Vol. 24 (11th ed.). p. 989.
- Arthur J. Arberry. Shiraz, Persian City of Saints and Poets, Norman, Okla., 1960
- John Innes Clarke (1963), The Iranian City of Shiraz, Department of Geography Research Paper Series, University of Durham, OCLC 609645
- Noelle Watson, ed. (1996), "Shiraz", International Dictionary of Historic Places, Fitzroy Dearborn, ISBN 9781884964039
- A.K.S. Lambton (1997). "S̲h̲īrāz". Encyclopaedia of Islam (2nd ed.). Brill.
- John W. Limbert (2004). Shiraz in the Age of Hafez: The Glory of a Medieval Persian City. University of Washington Press. ISBN 978-0-295-80288-6.
- Alireza Shapour Shahbazi (2004), "Shiraz: History to 1940", Encyclopædia Iranica
- C. Edmund Bosworth, ed. (2007). "Shiraz". Historic Cities of the Islamic World. Leiden: Koninklijke Brill. pp. 476+. ISBN 978-9004153882.
- Mahvash Alemi (2008). "Shiraz: the City of Gardens and Poets". In Salma K. Jayyusi; et al. (eds.). The City in the Islamic World. Leiden: Koninklijke Brill. pp. 525–554. ISBN 9789004162402.
- "Shiraz". Grove Encyclopedia of Islamic Art & Architecture. Oxford University Press. 2009. ISBN 978-0-19-530991-1.
- Setrag Manoukian (2012). City of Knowledge in Twentieth Century Iran: Shiraz, History and Poetry. Routledge. ISBN 978-1-136-62717-0.
