= Timeline of Mashhad =

History

The following is a timeline of the history of the city of Mashhad, Iran.

== Prior to 20th century ==
- 330 BCE - Passage and residence of Alexander the Great during his Persian campaign. Probably the first settlement in the modern city area.
- 818 CE - Death of Ali al-Ridha (8th Imam of Twelver Shia Islam) at Sanābādh; Imam Reza shrine established.
- 970s-990s - Imam Reza Shrine demolished "in an act of fanaticism" by Ghaznavid Nāṣer-al-dawla Sübüktigin.
- 1009 - Imam Reza Shrine rebuilt.
- 1121 - Town wall built.
- 1161 - Mashhad sacked by Ghuzz Turks.
- 1389 - Nearby Tus besieged and "left a heap of ruins" by forces of Timurid Miran Shah; refugees flee to Mashhad.
- 1418 - Goharshad Mosque built.
- 1426 - Bala-yi sar madrasa built at the Imam Reza shrine.
- 1439 - Du-dar madrasa built by Shah Rukh at the Imam Reza shrine.
- 1457 - Central Library of Astan Quds Razavi established.
- 1501 - Twelver Shia Islam declared official state religion in Iran, a development beneficial to Mashhad as a holy city (approximate date).
- 1507 - Mashhad taken by forces of Uzbek Muhammad Shaybani.
- 1544 - Mashhad sacked by Uzbek forces.
- 1589 - Mashhad besieged by forces of Shaybanid Abd al-Mumin.
- 1598 - Mashhad taken by forces of Abbas I of Persia; Uzbeks defeated.
- 1722 - Afghan Abdalis in power.
- 1726 - Mashhad besieged by Persian forces.
- 1753 - Mashhad besieged by forces of Afghan Ahmad Shah Durrani.
- 1803 - Mashhad besieged by forces of Fath Ali Shah.
- 1849 - Mashhad taken by forces of Husam al-Saltana.
- 1876 - Palace of Abbas Mirza built.
- 1889 - British and Russian governments maintain consulates-general.

== 20th century ==
- 1912 - 29 March: Bombing of city by Russians.
- 1918
  - Mashhad municipality (administrative entity) formed.
  - Mirza Abdol-Raheem Khan Zand Kashef ol-Molk (میرزا عبدالرحیم خان زند کاشف الملک) becomes the city's first mayor.
- 1920 - Population: 70,000-80,000 (approximate estimate).
- 1925 / 1304 SH - 31 March: Solar Hijri calendar legally adopted in Iran.
- 1949 - Razavi University established.
- 1959 - Nader Shah Mausoleum erected.
- 1963 - Population: 312,186 (estimate).
- 1964 - Astan Quds Razavi Central Museum inaugurated.
- 1966 - Mashhad railway station opens.
- 1968 - سینما هویزه (cinema) established.
- 1970 - سینما قدس (مشهد) (cinema) established.
- 1971 - سینما آفریقا (مشهد) (cinema) established.
- 1980 - باغ‌وحش وکیل‌آباد (zoo) established.
- 1982 - Population: 1,120,000 (estimate).
- 1983 - Samen Stadium opens.
- 1995 - Central Library of Astan Quds Razavi new building opens.
- 1996 - Population: 1,887,405.

== 21st century ==
- 2004
  - Proma Hypermarket in business.
  - City becomes part of the newly formed Razavi Khorasan Province.
- 2011
  - Mashhad Urban Railway begins operating.
  - Siah Jamegan Aboumoslem Khorasan F.C. (football club) formed.
  - پیست دوچرخه‌سواری مشهد (velodrome) opens.
  - Imam Reza Stadium construction begins.
  - Population: 2,766,258.
- 2013 - 14 June: Local election held.
- 2014
  - Sowlat Mortazavi becomes mayor.
  - City becomes part of newly formed national administrative Region 5.

== See also ==
- History of Mashhad
- List of mayors of Mashhad
- Timelines of other cities in Iran: Bandar Abbas, Hamadan, Isfahan, Kerman, Qom, Shiraz, Tabriz, Tehran, Yazd

== Bibliography ==
=== in English ===
- James Baillie Fraser (1825). "(Mushed)". Narrative of a Journey into Khorasan in the Years 1821 and 1822. London: Longman, Hurst, Rees, Orme, Brown, and Green.
- Edward Balfour (1885), "Meshed", Cyclopaedia of India (3rd ed.), London: B. Quaritch, hdl:2027/mdp.39015068611014
- Guy Le Strange (1905). "Khurasan: (Mashhad)". Lands of the Eastern Caliphate. Cambridge University Press.
- Houtum-Schindler, Albert (1910). "Meshed" . Encyclopædia Britannica. Vol. 18 (11th ed.). pp. 177–178.
- M. Streck [in German] (1934). "Meshhed". In M.T. Houtsma; et al. (eds.). Encyclopaedia of Islam. Brill. pp. 467–477. 1993 reprint
- Noelle Watson, ed. (1996), "Mashhad", International Dictionary of Historic Places, Fitzroy Dearborn, ISBN 9781884964039
- C. Edmund Bosworth, ed. (2007). "Mashhad". Historic Cities of the Islamic World. Leiden: Koninklijke Brill. pp. 332–338. ISBN 978-9004153882.
- ʿA.-Ḥ. Mawlawī, M. T. Moṣṭafawī, and E. Šakūrzāda (2011). "Āstān-e Qods-e Rażawī". Encyclopædia Iranica. (Article about the shrine)
- Aḥmad Monzawī; ʿAlī Naqī Monzawī (2012). "Bibliographies and Catalogues in Iran: Mašhad". Encyclopædia Iranica.

=== in other languages ===
- Muhammad Hasan Khan Sani al-Dawla, Matla' al-shams (in Persian), Tehran, OCLC 45141226 1883-1885
- M. P. Pagnini Alberti (1971), Strutture commerciali di una città di pelligrinaggio: Mashhad (Iran nord-orientale) (in Italian), Università degli Studi di Trieste, Istituto de Geografia, OCLC 492722329
