= Timeline of Hamadan =

The following is a timeline of the history of the city of Hamadan, Iran.

== Prior to 20th century ==
- 640s - Arabs in power.
- 806 - City besieged by forces of al-Amin.
- 931 - City besieged by forces of Ziyarid Mardāvij.
- 956 - Earthquake.
- 976 - Buyid Mu'ayyad al-Dawla in power.
- 997 - Shams al-Dawla in power.
- 1021 - Sama' al-Dawla in power.
- 1221 - City sacked by Mongols.
- 1224 - City sacked by Mongols again.
- 1315 - Gunbad-i Alayvian built (approximate date).
- 1724 - City sacked by forces of Ahmad Pasha of Baghdad.
- 1732 - City taken by forces of Nāder Shah Afšār; Ottomans ousted.
- 1789 - Agha Mohammad Khan Qajar takes Hamadan.
- 1838 - Congregational mosque built.
- 1883 - Imamzadeh Hossein, Hamadan (shrine) built.

== 20th century ==
- 1920 - Population: 30,000-40,000 (approximate estimate).
- 1932 - Hamadan power plant built.
- 1933 - City redesigned to accommodate motorcars; central Meidun-e Emam Khomeini and 6 radiating boulevards laid out.
- 1940 - Population: 103,874.
- 1952 - Avicenna Mausoleum erected.
- 1963 - Population: 114,610 (estimate).
- 1970 - Baba Tahir Mausoleum erected.
- 1973 - Bu-Ali Sina University established.
- 1976 - Population: 164,785 city; 229,977 urban agglomeration.
- 1986 - Population: 272,499.
- 1996 - Population: 401,281.

== 21st century ==
- 2007 - PAS Hamedan F.C. (football club) formed.
- 2009 - Shahid Mofatteh Stadium opens.
- 2011 - Population: 525,794.
- 2013 - 14 June: Local election held.
- 2014 - Syed Mustafa Rasul becomes mayor.

== See also ==
- History of Hamadan (de)
- Ecbatana, ancient city at site of present-day Hamadan
- Hamadan Province history
- Timelines of other cities in Iran: Bandar Abbas, Isfahan, Kerman, Mashhad, Qom, Shiraz, Tabriz, Tehran, Yazd

== Bibliography ==
=== in English ===
- "Hamadan", Persia: Report for the Year 1903-04 on the Trade of Kermanshah and District, Diplomatic and Consular Reports, London: H.M. Stationery Office, 1904, hdl:2027/uc1.b2872050
- Guy Le Strange (1905). "Jibal: (Hamadan)". Lands of the Eastern Caliphate. Cambridge University Press. pp. 194–196.
- A.V. Williams Jackson (1906), "(Hamadan)", Persia Past and Present: a Book of Travel and Research, New York: Macmillan, pp. 146–150
- W. Barthold (1984). "Ray and Hamadan". An Historical Geography of Iran. Translated by Svat Soucek. Princeton University Press. pp. 121–132. ISBN 978-1-4008-5322-9.
- Noelle Watson, ed. (1996), "Hamadan", International Dictionary of Historic Places, Fitzroy Dearborn, pp. 319+, ISBN 9781884964039 (Mostly about ancient Ecbatana)
- Parviz Aḏkāʾi (2012). "Hamadan: History, Islamic Period". Encyclopædia Iranica.
- Abdolhamid Eshragh (2012). "Hamadan: Urban Plan". Encyclopædia Iranica.
- Ali Mousavi (2012). "Hamadan: Monuments". Encyclopædia Iranica.
- Habibollah Zanjani (2012). "Hamadan: Population". Encyclopædia Iranica.

=== in other languages ===
- Farhad Khosrokhavar [in French] (1979). "Le Comité dans la révolution iranienne: le cas d'une ville moyenne, Hamadan". Peuples Méditerranéens (in French) (9): 85–100. ISSN 0399-1253 – via Internet Archive.
- Parviz Aḏkāʾi (1994). Ketābšenāsi-e Hamadān (in Persian). Hamadān. OCLC 863471613. (Bibliography)

== Images ==
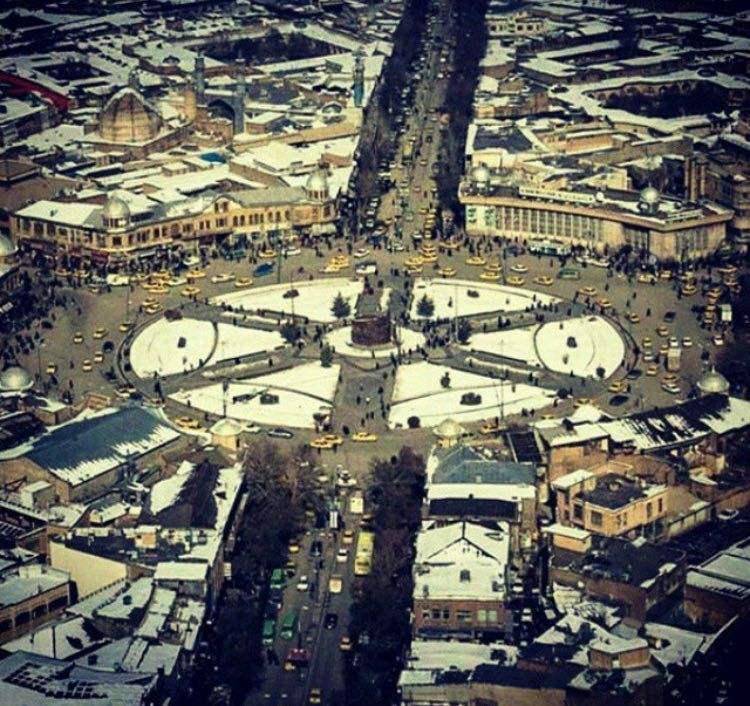
Imam Khomeini Square, Hamadan, laid out in 1933
