= List of mayors of Shiraz =

This is a list of mayors of Shiraz. It is the sixth most populous city in Iran and is the capital of Fars province. The city's 2009 population was 1,455,073. Shiraz is located in the southwest of Iran on the Roodkhaneye Khoshk (Dry river).

== Qajar dynasty ==
1. Habib Allah Khan Haj Ghavam Divan (1911)
2. Mostashir-o-Saltaneh Ghavami (1917–1923)
3. (?) Ghavami (1923)

== Pahlavi dynasty ==
1. Mirza Khan Sheibani (1926–1927)
2. Amir Nosrat Khajeh Noori (1927)
3. Lotf-Ali Moadel (Moadel-o-Saltaneh) (1927–1928)
4. Ghasem Nam-Avar (1928–1929)
5. Ali Asghar Hejazi (1941)
6. Mohammad Kazem Hakimi (1941)
7. Ahmad Ali Bani-Adam (1943–1944)
8. Hesam-o-Din Arefi (1944–1945)
9. Seyed Mohammad Taghi Golestan (1945–1946)
10. Ahmad Khosro Pisheh (1946)
11. Mohammad Hassan Khan Behbahani (1946)
12. Morteza Khan Hekmat (1947–1950)
13. Mohammad Gholi Khan Ghavami (1950–1954)
14. Siavash Kargar (1954)
15. Heshmat-Allah Emami (1954–1955)
16. Aziz Allah Ghavami (1955)
17. General (?) Ghavami (1956)
18. General Seyf Allah Hemmat (1956–1960)
19. Seyed Ali Atri (1960–1961)
20. Gholam Reza Dabiran (1961–1963)
21. Iraj Merzad (1963)
22. Mohammad Ali Pour-Babaei (1966–1967)
23. Aman Allah Safaei (1967–1968)
24. Habib Allah Behbahani (1968–1970)
25. Ezzat Allah Tir-Andaz (1970)
26. Fath-Ali Amir Ebrahimi (1970–1972)
27. Iraj Atarod (1972)
28. Rahmat Allah Izedi (1972–1973)
29. Hadi Shapourian (1973–1975)
30. Fereydoun Movahhedi (1976–1977)
31. Seyed Mehdi Abtahi (1977–1979)

== Islamic Republic ==
1. Enayatollah Khaledi (1979)
2. Mohammad Ali Mo'takef (1979–1980)
3. Enayat Allah Sanaee (1980–1981)
4. Abol Ghasem Kharazmi (1981–1982)
5. Seyed Hossein Faghihi (1982–1983)
6. Mohammad Javad Ranaee Far (1983–1985)
7. Mohammad Kasraee (1985)
8. Mohammad Javad Ranaee Far (1985–1986)
9. Asad Alah Abedi (1986–1988)
10. Samad Raja (1988)
11. Mohammad Sadegh Kiyani Nejad (1988)
12. Samad Raja (1988–1993)
13. Mohammad Mehdi Ghahramani (1993–1995)
14. Mohammad Zand Vakili (1995–1997)
15. Faraj Alah Rajabi (1997–2003)
16. Samad Raja (2003–2005)
17. Jafar Ghaderi (2005–2007)
18. Reza Kheir Andish (2007)
19. Mehran Etemadi (2007–2010)
20. Alireza Pakfetrat (2010–2017)
21. Heydar Eskandarpour (2017–2021)
22. Ehsan Asnafi (2021–2022)
23. Mohammad Hassan Asadi (2022-Present)

== See also ==
- Timeline of Shiraz
