= Rangsazi Iran =

Iranian paint manufacturer

- Type: Private
- Industry: Coatings, Paint, Petrochemicals
- Founded: Tehran, Iran (1939)
- Founder: Ahmad Sanei
- Headquarters: 5th km Saveh road, Tehran, Iran
- Key people: Farhad Sanei, CEO
- Services: Coating, Paint
- Owner: Selective Shareholders
- Number of employees: 150+
- Website: www.rangsazi.com

Rangsazi Iran - Iran Paint Manufacturing Company (Persian: شرکت رنگسازی ایران) was founded in 1939 as the first paint producer in Iran as well as the Middle East. Rangsazi Iran was as of 2008 the top producer in decorative and industrial paints within the country in terms of volume of sales and quality.

== History ==
The company was founded by Ahmad Sanei in 1939. Ahmad Sanei is the founder of the paint industry in Iran. The first factory was set up in Zargande in the Shemiran district of Tehran. In 1959, a larger facility was acquired by the company on Saveh road in Tehran.

== Products ==
=== Paint ===
- High gloss enamel alkyd paint
- Matt alkyd paint
- Alkyd undercoat paint
- Emulsion paint
- Emulsion paint (Distemper)
- Emulsion acrylic paint
- Pool paint
- Alkyd anti rust
- Alkyd varnish
- Aluminum paint
- Traffic paint
- Nitrocellulose putties
- Nitrocellulose sealer
- Nitrocellulose clear
- Epoxy paint
- Thinner

=== Resin ===
- Long oil alkyd
- Medium oil alkyd
- Quick air drying alkyd
- Coconut Short oil alkyd
- Soya short oil alkyd
- Curt acid short oil alkyd
- Palm kernel short oil alkyd
- Castor short oil alkyd
- Kardura short Oil alkyd
- Butylated melamine resin
- Butylated urea resin
- Maleic resin

=== Driers ===
- Cobalt octoate
- Lead octoate
- Calcium octoate
