= KhabarOnline =

Iranian news agency

- Type: News agency
- Founded: 2008
- Headquarters: Iran
- Key people: Alireza Moezzi (owner); Hassan Lasjerdi (managing director)
- Website: khabaronline.ir

KhabarOnline (Persian: خبرآنلاین) is an Iranian news agency.

== History and management ==
KhabarOnline was established in 2008 under the ownership of Hossein Vahedipour. Various sources described the agency after its creation as being close to Parliament speaker Ali Larijani, which the parliamentary public relations office publicly denied in 2012. The current owner is Alireza Moezzi and the managing director is Hassan Lasjerdi.

In 2015, the Prosecutor-General of Iran filed a complaint against KhabarOnline for publishing an article on the extent of Islamic Revolutionary Guard Corps corruption. In 2020, KhabarOnline's director was prosecuted after KhabarOnline published an article that, quoting Euronews, stated Quds Force commander Qasem Soleimani had been "killed" instead of "martyred".

== Content ==
KhabarOnline has been editorially described as both moderate and conservative or principlist. Reporters Without Borders referred to the publication in 2026 as "pro-regime independent". KhabarOnline states it is principlist but avoids "party and factional tendencies", and different political factions and personalities are represented in its coverage.

The outlet publishes content in Persian, English and Arabic.
