= 530s BC =

This article concerns the period 539 BC – 530 BC.

== Events and trends ==
- 539 BC—Babylon is conquered by Cyrus, defeating Nabonidus.
- 538 BC— The Babylonian Captivity ends when Cyrus, king of Persia, allows Jews in Babylon to return to Jerusalem.
- 535 BC—Phocaean Greek colonists clash at sea with Carthaginians and Etruscans in Battle of Alalia (Corsica).
- 534 BC
  - Lucius Tarquinius Superbus becomes seventh King of Rome, after murdering the sixth king Servius Tullius.
  - Competitions for tragedy are instituted at the City Dionysia festival in Athens.
- 530 BC
  - Cyrus II is killed in war against obscure tribes.
  - Cambyses II starts to rule in Persia.
  - Royal Arch Masons take this year as the epoch for dating their documents Anno Inventionis after the beginning of the Second Temple by Zerubbabel.
- c. 530 BC—Temple of Apollo at Delphi is built.
- c. 530 BC—Peplos Kore, from the Acropolis, Athens, is made. It is now at Acropolis Museum, Athens.
- c. 530 BC—Kroisos Kouros, from a cemetery at Anavysos, near Athens is made. It is now on display at the National Archaeological Museum, Athens.
- c. 530 BC—525 BC—Siphnian Treasury, Delphi, is built.
- c. 530 BC—525 BC—Battle between the Gods and the Giants, fragments of the north frieze of the Siphnian Treasury, from the Sanctuary of Apollo, Delphi, is made. It is now at the Delphi Archaeological Museum.

== Significant people ==
- 539 BC—Death of Belshazzar, the last king of Babylon?
- c. 535 BC—Birth of Heraclitus of Ephesus, Greek philosopher
- c. 531 BC—Death of Laozi, founder of Taoism (traditional date)
