= Erdkunde =

Erdkunde – Archive for Scientific Geography
- Discipline: Geography
- Language: English, German

Publication details
- Former name: Erdkunde – Archiv für Wissenschaftliche Geographie
- History: 1947–present
- Frequency: 4/year
- Impact factor: 2.184 (2020)

Standard abbreviations
- ISO 4: Erdkunde

Indexing
- ISSN: 0014-0015 (print); 2702-5985 (web)

Links
- Journal homepage; Online access

Erdkunde – Archive for Scientific Geography is a quarterly peer-reviewed academic journal of geography published at the University of Bonn (Germany). Articles have been published in English since 2008. Since September 2016, the journal is available online and open access. All articles are available for free immediately and publication fees are not charged. Archived volumes are available via the journal's website. The printed version of the journal is distributed worldwide via subscriptions. Erdkunde publishes scientific articles covering the whole range of physical geography and human geography. The journal offers state of the art reports on recent trends and developments in specific fields of geography and comprehensive and critical reviews of new geographical publications. High-quality maps and large-format supplements are of particular importance. Since 2021, the journal offers the option of publishing data publications.

== Editors ==
The journal is edited by Carl Beierkuhnlein (Bayreuth), Jörg Bendix (Marburg), Andreas Dittmann (Gießen), Uta Hohn (Bochum), Hermann Kreutzmann (Berlin), Jörg Löffler (Bonn, editor-in-chief), Heike Mayer (Bern) und Harald Zepp (Bochum). Editorial management: Dirk Wundram. Former editors: Hans Heinrich Blotevogel, Julius Büdel, Bernd Diekkrüger, Richard Dikau, Eckart Ehlers, Helmut Hahn, Wolfgang Hartke, Peter Höllermann, Wolfgang Kuls, Wilhelm Lauer, Hermann Lautensach, Herbert Lehmann, Herbert Louis, Horst Mensching, Hans Mortensen, Gottfried Pfeiffer, Winfried Schenk, Carl Troll, Matthias Winiger. Former editorial management: Hans Böhm, Andreas Dittmann, Helmut Hahn, Hans Dieter Laux, Hans Voigt.

== History ==
The journal was first published in 1947 under the German title "Erdkunde Archiv für Wissenschaftliche Geographie". As Carl Troll wrote in 1964 in a retrospective, the foundation of a new journal for geography resulted rather unintentionally out of the uncertain situation of the first post-war years. The main idea was to continue Petermanns Geographische Mitteilungen as well as the "Zeitschrift der Gesellschaft für Erdkunde zu Berlin" as the two oldest and internationally most respected geographical journals. Since the continuation of the "Zeitschrift der Gesellschaft für Erdkunde zu Berlin" in Berlin was initially very uncertain, Carl Troll initiated the plan to continue the journal or a successor journal from Bonn. Even before the first issue was published, however, the Gesellschaft für Erdkunde zu Berlin expressed reservations about relocating the editorship. Subsequently, the relaunch of "Zeitschrift der Gesellschaft für Erdkunde zu Berlin" was pursued from Berlin and the publication was finally resumed in 1949 under the title "DIE ERDE, Zeitschrift der Gesellschaft für Erdkunde zu Berlin". However, since preparations for the new journal were already well advanced in Bonn, the plan was pursued and the first issue of the journal "Erdkunde Archiv für Wissenschaftliche Geographie" was published in 1947. The title of the journal emerged from the original plan to continue the "Zeitschrift der Gesellschaft für Erdkunde zu Berlin". The abbreviated form "Erdkunde" resulted from the fact that the licensing regulations initially did not permit designations such as "Zeitschrift", "Gesellschaft" and "Berlin". When it became clear that a continuation of the "Zeitschrift der Gesellschaft für Erdkunde zu Berlin" was intended, the subtitle "Archiv für Wissenschaftliche Geographie" was added for the purpose of clear identification. In the following years, the newly founded journal underwent a quite changeful development, as was well documented in a review of its 50-year history by Hans Böhm and Eckart Ehlers. His successors also felt committed to the claim already pursued by Carl Troll to develop the journal from a voice of German geography to an organ of international geography. In line with this, it was finally decided in 2007 to publish the papers in English, thus opening the journal more clearly to an international reader- and authorship. Since 2008, the journal has been published under the English title "Erdkunde – Archive for Scientific Geography". In 2010/2011, the archive of Erdkunde has been digitized and all content is now accessible for free. At the beginning of 2021, the copyrights and licensing regulations were adjusted and all content is now published under the creative commons BY license.

== Abstracting and indexing ==
The journal is abstracted and indexed by the Science Citation Index Expanded, Social Sciences Citation Index, Current Contents/Physical, Chemical & Earth Sciences, Current Contents/Social and Behavioral Sciences, and Scopus. According to the Journal Citation Reports, the journal has a 2020 impact factor of 2.184.

== Articles ==
Most cited articles since 2005:

- Markus Keck und Patrick Sakdapolrak: "What is social resilience? Lessons learned and ways forward." In: "Erdkunde – Archive for Scientific Geography" 67, 2013, S. 5–19.
- Christian Körner: "Climatic treelines: Conventions, global patterns, causes" In: "Erdkunde – Archive for Scientific Geography" 61, 2007, S. 316–324.
- Wilhelm Barthlott, Alexandra Hostert, Gerold Kier, Wolfgang Koper, Holger Kreft, Jens Mutke, M. Daud Rafiqpoor und Jan Henning Sommer: "Geographic patterns of vascular plant diversity at continental to global scales" In: "Erdkunde – Archive for Scientific Geography" 61, 2007, S. 305–315.
- Martin Kehl: "Quaternary climate change in Iran – the state of knowledge" In "Erdkunde – Archive for Scientific Geography" 63, 2009, S. 1–17.
- Leo J. de Haan: "The livelihood approach: a critical exploration" In "Erdkunde - Archive for Scientific Geography" 66, 2012, S. 345–357.
- Joachim Scheiner: "Mobility biographies: elements of a biographical theory of travel demand" In "Erdkunde – Archive for Scientific Geography" 61, 2007, S. 161–173.
