= Xavier de Planhol =

Xavier de Planhol (3 February 1926 – 17 May 2016) was a professor of geography at the University of Paris-Sorbonne and a widely acknowledged authority on political geography. From 1958, when he began to publish monographs and articles during his first fieldwork in Azerbaijan, and later in the Alborz region of Iran, to his monumental and highly acclaimed, Les Nations du Prophète (1993) and Minorités en Islam (1997), he has maintained his deep interest in Persia and the Iranian civilization. He was also a contributor to Encyclopædia Iranica, submitting articles ranging from "Abadan" to "Boundaries", "Cholera", "Darya?", "Earthquakes", "Famines", and a series of forthcoming articles on "Geography". A bibliography of de Planhol's wide-ranging publications up to 1995 has been compiled and published by Professor Daniel Balland in Geographie Historique et Culturelle de l’Europe: Hommage au Professor Xavier de Planhol, by Jean-Robert Pitte (1995).
