= Charles Ambrose Storey =

British Arabist and academic

Charles Ambrose Storey (1888–1968) was a British orientalist.

His best known contribution was his Persian Literature: A Bio-bibliographical Survey, published in five volumes between 1927 and 2004. It was envisioned by Storey as a counterpart to Carl Brockelmann's Geschichte der arabischen Litteratur.
