= Svat Soucek =

Svat Soucek (full name Svatopluk Souček) is a Czech-American historian. He is a compiler and author of works in relation to Central Asia, and Central Asian studies. He was born in Prague and has a PhD in Turkish and Arabic studies from Columbia University. He worked in the Oriental Division of the New York Public Library, and as a professor of history at Princeton University, specialising in historical cartography. His works include Piri Reis and Turkish Mapmaking After Columbus (1996), A History of Inner Asia (2000), The Persian Gulf: Its Past and Present (2008), and The History of the Maritime Wars of the Turks (2012).
