= 2013 Iranian local elections =

- 14 June 2013
Alliance	Principlists	Reformists
Swing	▼10≈31 pp	▲0≈10 pp
Provincial capitals	240 / 479 (50%)	88 / 479 (18%)

The Iranian local elections took place on 14 June 2013 to elected members of the fourth council of the City and Village Councils of Iran. This election was held by a general election with the presidential election. The original date of the election was in June 2010 but Parliament of Iran voted to increase age of the councils from 4 to 7 years. The councils began their work one month after the election to elect the new mayors.

== Background ==
The city and village councils are local establishments that are elected by public vote in all cities and villages across the country. Council members in each city or village are elected for a four-year term. The councils are tasked with helping the Islamic republic's social, economic, cultural and educational advancement by encouraging public participation in social affairs. The city councils also elects city mayors.

== Registrations ==
The registration of candidates took place from 15 to 20 April 2013. The Guardian Council announced the final candidates on 16 May 2013. The candidates that failed to enter the election had a four days timeout for protest.

== Members ==
The councils have 124,700 original members; with the allowance members, it reaches to 207,587 members. This is different from the previous election.

Population	Num. of members
20,000 or less	5 (original) +2 (allowance)
20,000 to 50,000	7 + 3
50,000 to 100,000	9 + 4
100,000 to 200,000	11 + 5
200,000 to 500,000	13 + 6
50,000 to 1,000,000	15 + 7
1,000,000 to 2,000,000	21 + 8
2,000,000 or more	25 + 10
Tehran	31 + 12

== Election summary ==
Ministry of Interior have announced that election will be held by electoral vote in fourteen provinces. The candidates can began their publicity from 6 June and it will be end 24 hours before the election. According to Interior Minister, Mostafa Mohammad Najjar a number of 352,165 persons have enrollment.

== Results ==
=== Provincial capitals ===
Khabar Online published the results of the election in 9 major cities, according to electoral lists. Those who did not count as Principlist or Reformist, were Independents:

City	Principlists	Reformists	Independents
Tehran	18 / 31 (58%)	13 / 31 (42%)	0 / 31 (0%)
Mashhad	24 / 25 (96%)	0 / 25 (0%)	1 / 25 (4%)
Isfahan	10 / 21 (48%)	3 / 21 (14%)	8 / 21 (38%)
Shiraz	13 / 21 (62%)	0 / 21 (0%)	8 / 21 (38%)
Karaj	6 / 21 (29%)	0 / 21 (0%)	15 / 21 (71%)
Qom	20 / 21 (95%)	0 / 21 (0%)	1 / 21 (5%)
Tabriz	9 / 21 (43%)	2 / 21 (10%)	10 / 21 (48%)
Arak	10 / 15 (67%)	0 / 15 (0%)	5 / 15 (33%)
Bushehr	3 / 11 (27%)	1 / 11 (9%)	7 / 11 (64%)
Total	113 / 187 (60%)	19 / 187 (10%)	55 / 187 (29%)

Fars News Agency also published a detailed report for province capitals, with the results as following:

Province capital seats won by political factions according to Fars News Agency report.
1. Principlists (50.1%)
2. Reformists (18.4%)
3. Independents (31.5%)

City	Principlists	Reformists	Independents
Tehran	16 / 31 (52%)	13 / 31 (42%)	2 / 31 (6%)
Mashhad	24 / 25 (96%)	0 / 25 (0%)	1 / 25 (4%)
Tabriz	7 / 21 (33%)	2 / 21 (10%)	12 / 21 (57%)
Isfahan	15 / 21 (71%)	3 / 21 (14%)	3 / 21 (14%)
Ahwaz	11 / 21 (52%)	3 / 21 (14%)	7 / 21 (33%)
Qom	20 / 21 (95%)	0 / 21 (0%)	1 / 21 (5%)
Shiraz	16 / 21 (76%)	2 / 21 (10%)	6 / 21 (29%)
Karaj	3 / 21 (14%)	0 / 21 (0%)	18 / 21 (86%)
Rasht	3 / 15 (20%)	8 / 15 (53%)	4 / 15 (27%)
Urmia	9 / 15 (60%)	0 / 15 (0%)	6 / 15 (40%)
Kermanshah	7 / 15 (47%)	4 / 15 (27%)	4 / 15 (27%)
Arak	13 / 15 (87%)	0 / 15 (0%)	2 / 15 (13%)
Hamedan	10 / 15 (67%)	0 / 15 (0%)	5 / 15 (33%)
Kerman	9 / 15 (60%)	3 / 15 (20%)	3 / 15 (20%)
Gorgan	6 / 13 (46%)	7 / 13 (54%)	0 / 13 (0%)
Zanjan	6 / 13 (46%)	2 / 13 (15%)	5 / 13 (38%)
Yazd	2 / 13 (15%)	8 / 13 (62%)	3 / 13 (23%)
Sari	7 / 13 (54%)	3 / 13 (23%)	3 / 13 (23%)
Khorramabad	5 / 13 (38%)	0 / 13 (0%)	8 / 13 (62%)
Sanandaj	8 / 13 (62%)	2 / 13 (15%)	3 / 13 (23%)
Bandar Abbas	9 / 13 (69%)	0 / 13 (0%)	4 / 13 (31%)
Ardabil	6 / 13 (46%)	0 / 13 (0%)	7 / 13 (54%)
Qazvin	9 / 13 (69%)	2 / 13 (15%)	2 / 13 (15%)
Bojnurd	0 / 13 (0%)	0 / 13 (0%)	13 / 13 (100%)
Semnan	7 / 11 (64%)	2 / 11 (18%)	2 / 21 (10%)
Shahrekord	7 / 11 (64%)	2 / 11 (18%)	2 / 11 (18%)
Bushehr	4 / 11 (36%)	4 / 11 (36%)	3 / 11 (27%)
Ilam	2 / 11 (18%)	3 / 11 (27%)	6 / 11 (55%)
Birjand	2 / 11 (18%)	5 / 11 (45%)	4 / 11 (36%)
Yasuj	0 / 11 (0%)	0 / 11 (0%)	11 / 11 (100%)
Zahedan	0 / 9 (0%)	9 / 9 (100%)	0 / 9 (0%)
Total	240 / 479 (50%)	88 / 479 (18%)	151 / 479 (32%)

== Highlights ==
For the first time in Iran, Sepanta Niknam, a Zoroastrian citizen was elected to the city council of Yazd.

In another unprecedented event, Samiyeh Balochzehi, a Baloch Sunni woman was elected as a mayor in Iran, by the council of Kalat in Sistan and Baluchestan province.
