= Regions of Iran =

The Islamic Republic of Iran has been divided into regions in a number of different ways historically. It has been divided into five administrative regions (Note: Persian: مناطق manâteq or Persian: منطقه‌ها mantaqehâ, sg. منطقه mantaqe) since 2014.

== Current administrative regions ==
Iran's thirty-one provinces were grouped into five regions on 22 June 2014, based on a decision by the Ministry of Interior. In this change, the adjacency, geographical location and similarities of the provinces were considered.

The Constitution of Iran does not provide for regions and they are not the constituent units of the country but exist purely for the convenience of governmental administration.

According to Javad Naserian, the Ministry of Interior's Management Development and Human Resources Vice-Minister, the purpose of this grouping of provinces was the creation of synergy, transfer of experience, information exchange, and regional development. Also, it now provides an intermediate level where provinces can discuss their problems among themselves, instead of going immediately to Tehran.

The intention was for each region to have regularly scheduled meetings of the constituent provinces' governors-general, rotating the meeting place through the provincial capitals. The host province would provide the chairman of each meeting. A regional secretariat would be established in the capital city of the main province of each region, with a coordinating bureau in the Ministry of Interior headquarters in Tehran.

Region	Capital	Provinces	Population	Area (km^{2})
Region 1 ۱ منطقه	Tehran	Alborz province Golestan province Mazandaran province Qazvin province Qom province Semnan province Tehran province	23,343,033	193,109
Region 2 ۲ منطقه	Isfahan	Bushehr province Chaharmahal and Bakhtiari province Fars province Hormozgan province Isfahan province Kohgiluyeh and Boyer-Ahmad province	12,973,089	354,885
Region 3 ۳ منطقه	Tabriz	Ardabil province East Azerbaijan province Gilan province Kurdistan province West Azerbaijan province Zanjan province	12,782,820	165,839
Region 4 ۴ منطقه	Kermanshah	Hamadan province Ilam province Kermanshah province Khuzestan province Lorestan province Markazi province	11,739,552	185,978
Region 5 ۵ منطقه	Mashhad	Kerman province North Khorasan province Razavi Khorasan province Sistan and Baluchestan province South Khorasan province Yazd province	13,145,227	734,576

== Historical regions ==
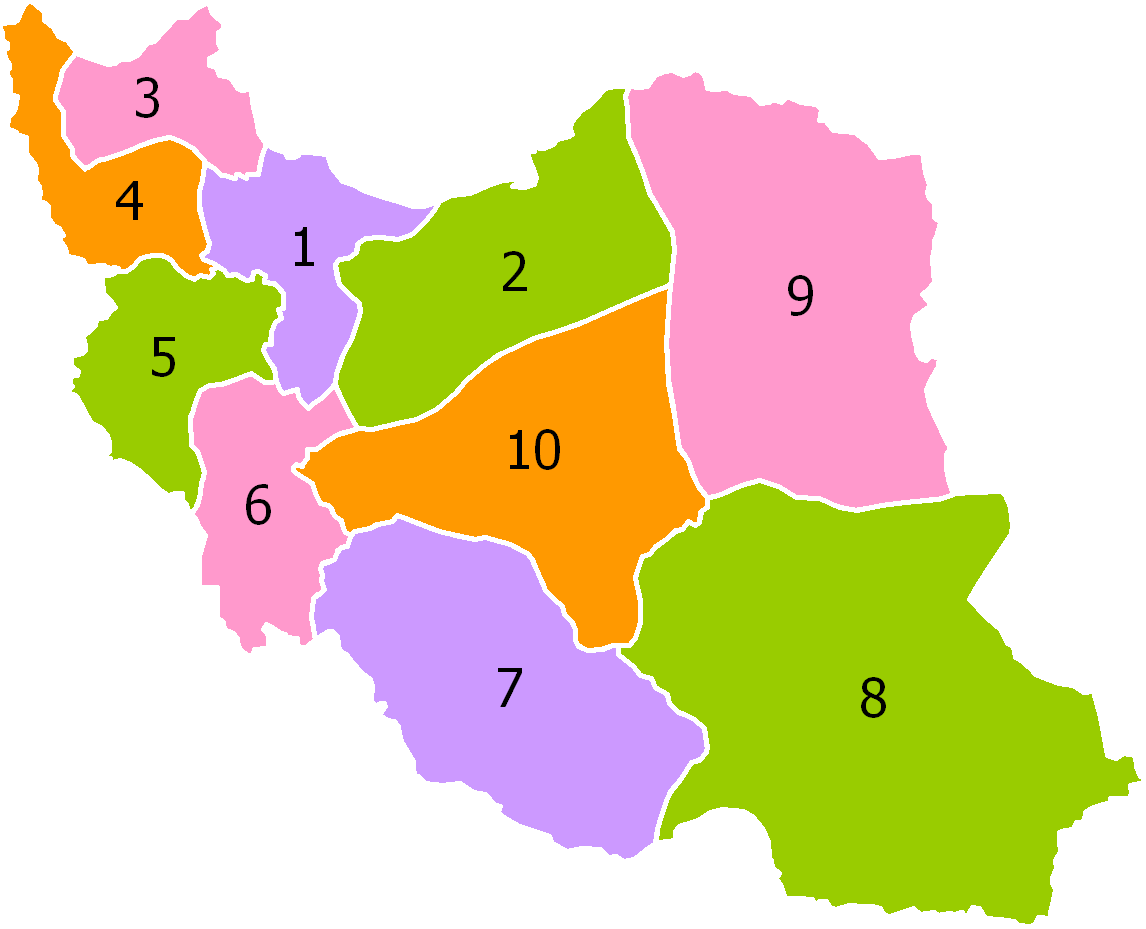
Map of provinces of Iran, 1937–1960

In 1937 the territory of Iran was divided into ten administrative regions: Region 1, Region 2, Region 10, etc.^{(پیشینه تقسیمات کشوری ایران)} For example, Region 7 or "Seventh Province" corresponded to present-day Fars province per the "Territorial Subdivision Act of 1316 Š./1937 (Qānūn-e taqsīmāt-e kešvar)."

Histories, travel books and economic analyses often refer to less formal, more historical or geographical, Iranian regions. The borders of these are not fixed and often have changed over time, and even overlapped at the same time.

- Alamut – in the Alborz mountain range of northern Iran;
- Central Iran: Known as Iraq-i Ajam (Persian Iraq)
- Baluchistan (Southeastern Iran) – sometimes just Sistan and Baluchestan province and sometimes all of Baluchistan;
- Caspian Iran (Northern Iran, Tabaristan or "Mardi and Hyrcania") – Gilan province, Mazandaran province, and Golestan province, and historically sometimes northern Semnan
- Eastern Iran
- Iranian Azerbaijan – approximately the current provinces of Region 3, but often excluding Kurdistan province and often excluding the Caspian province of Gilan;
- Iranian Kurdistan – including Kurdistan province, Kermanshah province and parts of Ilam province and parts of West Azerbaijan province;
- Khorasan – consisting of North Khorasan province, Razavi Khorasan province, South Khorasan province, and sometimes eastern Semnan province
  - Quhistan – southern Khorasan;
- Southern Iran (also known as the Persian Gulf region of Iran) – Fars, Kohgiluyeh and Buyer Ahmad, Hormozgan and Bushehr provinces;
- Southeastern Iran (Carmania) – mostly Kerman province, but often extending to the coast;
- Western Iran (Khuzestan, Elam) – the 'birthplace of Iran', similar to Region 4 (Hamadan province, Ilam province, Kermanshah province, Khuzestan province, Lorestan province, Markazi province), but often including all of or some of Qazvin province, Kurdistan province, Chaharmahal and Bakhtiari province and Kohgiluyeh and Boyer-Ahmad province;

== See also ==
- Geographic history of Iran
