= Albert Houtum-Schindler =

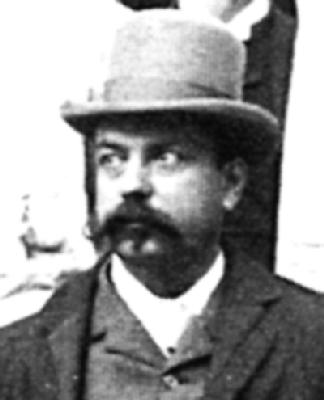
Houtum-Schindler circa 1870

General Sir Albert Houtum-Schindler KCIE (born 24 September 1846, the Netherlands or Germany; died 15 June 1916, Fenstanton, England) was a scholar of Persia and an employee of the Persian government.

== Career ==
Educated in engineering at Leipzig University, Houtum-Schindler was recruited to Persia in 1868 by the Indo-European Telegraph Service. Eight years later he became an inspector-general of the Persian telegraph service, and acquired the honorary rank of general in the Persian army. In 1882 he became the managing director of Khorasan's turquoise mines, and in 1889 became the inspector of branches for the Imperial Bank, as well as inspector-general of mines for the Persian Bank Mining Rights Corporation. However, he was dismissed in 1894 after this failed, which was deemed due to his management. By 1896 Houtum-Schindler had become Director of the Foreign Office Control Department and acted as adviser to the Persian Government on numerous topics. From 1902 to 1911 he held the post of honorary consul-general for Sweden.

Houtum-Schindler married Louise Fagergren in 1870. She died in 1879 and in 1884 he married an English woman, Florence, with whom he had two sons, Alexander and Leonard.

He retired to England in 1911, suffering increasingly from gout, and died in 1916.

== Research and writing ==
During his work at the telegraph and mining operations, Houtum-Schindler travelled much of the country for long periods, during which he accumulated extensive amounts of geographical, archaeological, historical, linguistic, ethnographic, biological and financial data, and produced maps of various regions. The specialist library that he accumulated caused him to be frequently consulted for advice by European companies, foreign legations, and travellers; and he published over fifty articles in leading journals of the time, as well as writing articles for handbooks and reference works, including numerous articles for the 1911 Encyclopædia Britannica.

== Anecdotes ==
In 1879, Houtum-Schindler was ordered by the Persian government to curtail his excursions in Kerman province "because his horses and mules ate up all the stock" of grain in the province, which mostly imported its grain.

== Honours ==
- CIE: Commander of the Order of the Indian Empire
- KCIE: Knight Commander of the Order of the Indian Empire
- Iran Order of the Lion and the Sun
- Kingdom of Prussia: Order of the Red Eagle, 2nd class with star – 1901

== Selected works ==
- "Reisen im Südlichen Persien 1879". Zeitschrift der Gesellschaft für Erdkunde zu Berlin (in German). 16: 307–366. 1881.
- "Die Parsen in Persien: ihre Sprache und einige ihrer Gebräuche". Zeitschrift der Deutschen Morgenländischen Gesellschaft (in German). 36: 54–88. 1882. – an account of the Zoroastrian community in Yazd and Kerman
- Houtum-Schindler, A. (1888). "On the length of the Persian Farsakh". Proceedings of the Royal Geographical Society and Monthly Record of Geography. 10 (9): 584–588. doi:10.2307/1800976. JSTOR 1800976.
- "The Telegraph Department in Persia". The Imperial and Asiatic Quarterly Review and Oriental and Colonial Record. 3 (1): 99–102. 1892.
- Description of the card game Ganjifa, as quoted in Chess and Playing Cards: Catalogue of games and implements for divination exhibited by the United States National Museum in connection with the department of archaeology and paleontology of the University of Pennsylvania at the Cotton States and International Exposition, Stewart Culin, Atlanta, Georgia, 1895
- Eastern Persian Irak, Royal Geographical Society and J. Murray, London, 1896, an account of the region between Isfahan and Tehran. Available from Google books but full view only available in the US.
