= Imperial Bank building, Tehran =

Historic building in Tehran, Iran

Imperial Bank Building
- ساختمان بانک شاهی (Persian)
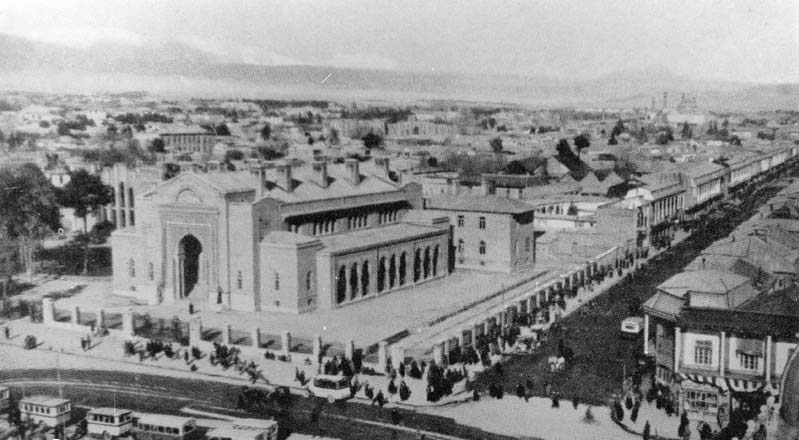
- Interactive map of Imperial Bank Building
- 35.6861°N 51.4231°E
- Location: Tehran, Iran

Site notes
- Architect: Markar Galstiants

The Imperial Bank building (Persian: ساختمان بانک شاهی) is a historic building in Toopkhaneh Square Tehran, Iran. It was constructed in 1929 on a design by architect Markar Galstiants, replacing an earlier building from the late Qajar era. It was the head office of the Imperial Bank of Persia and of its successor entities the Imperial Bank of Iran (1935–1949), British Bank of Iran and the Middle East (1949–1952), and Bank Bazargani (1952–1979). Since the Iranian Revolution in 1979, it has been owned by the Tejarat Bank.

The Imperial Bank building is listed in the national heritage sites of Iran with the number 7440.

== Gallery ==
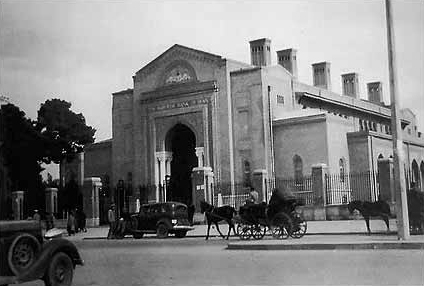

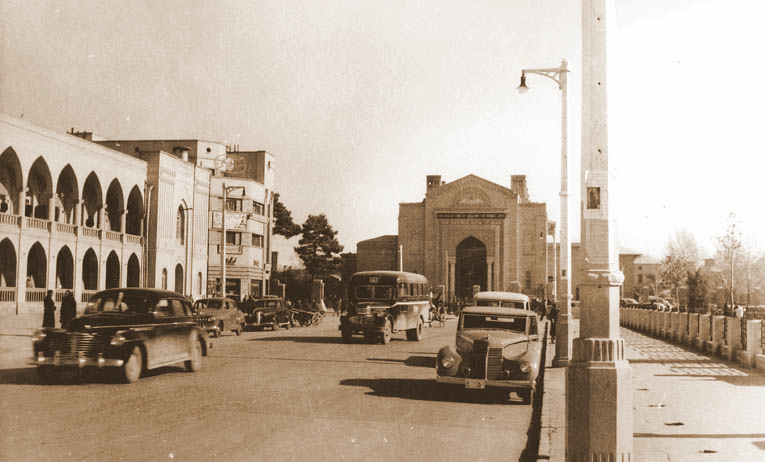

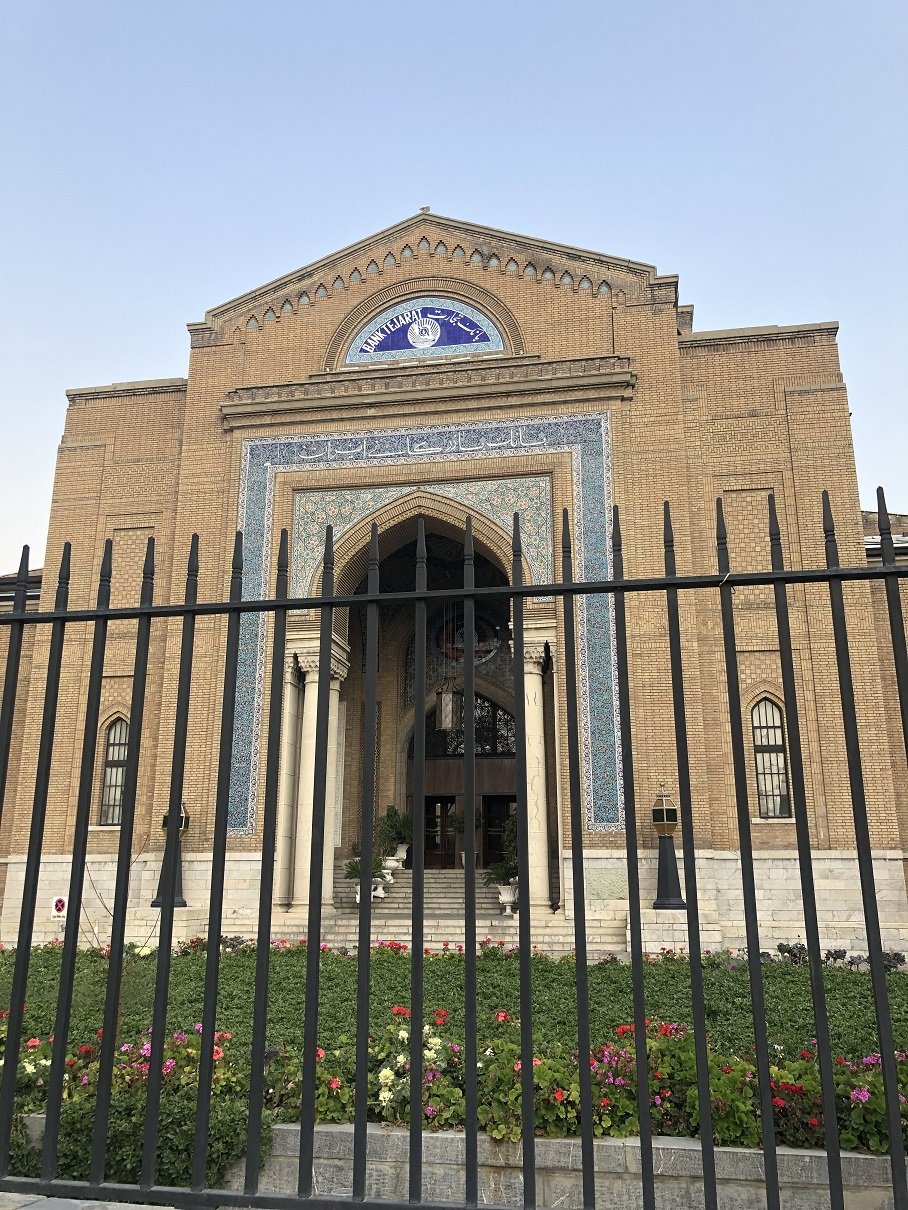

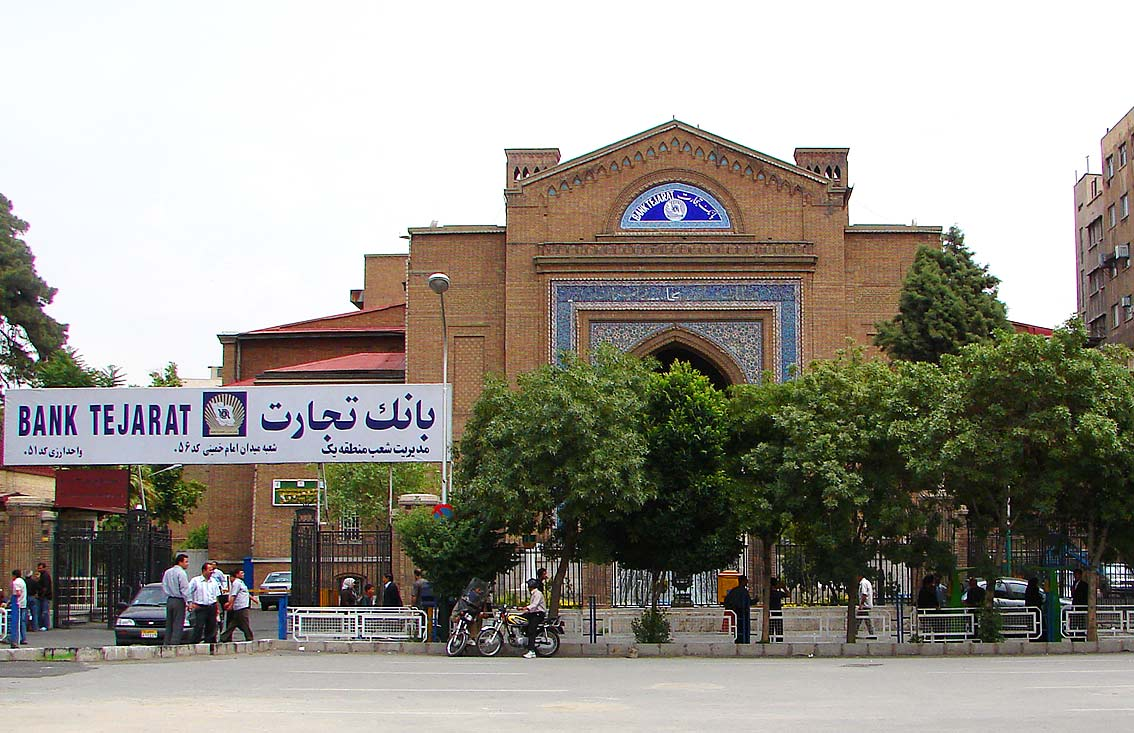

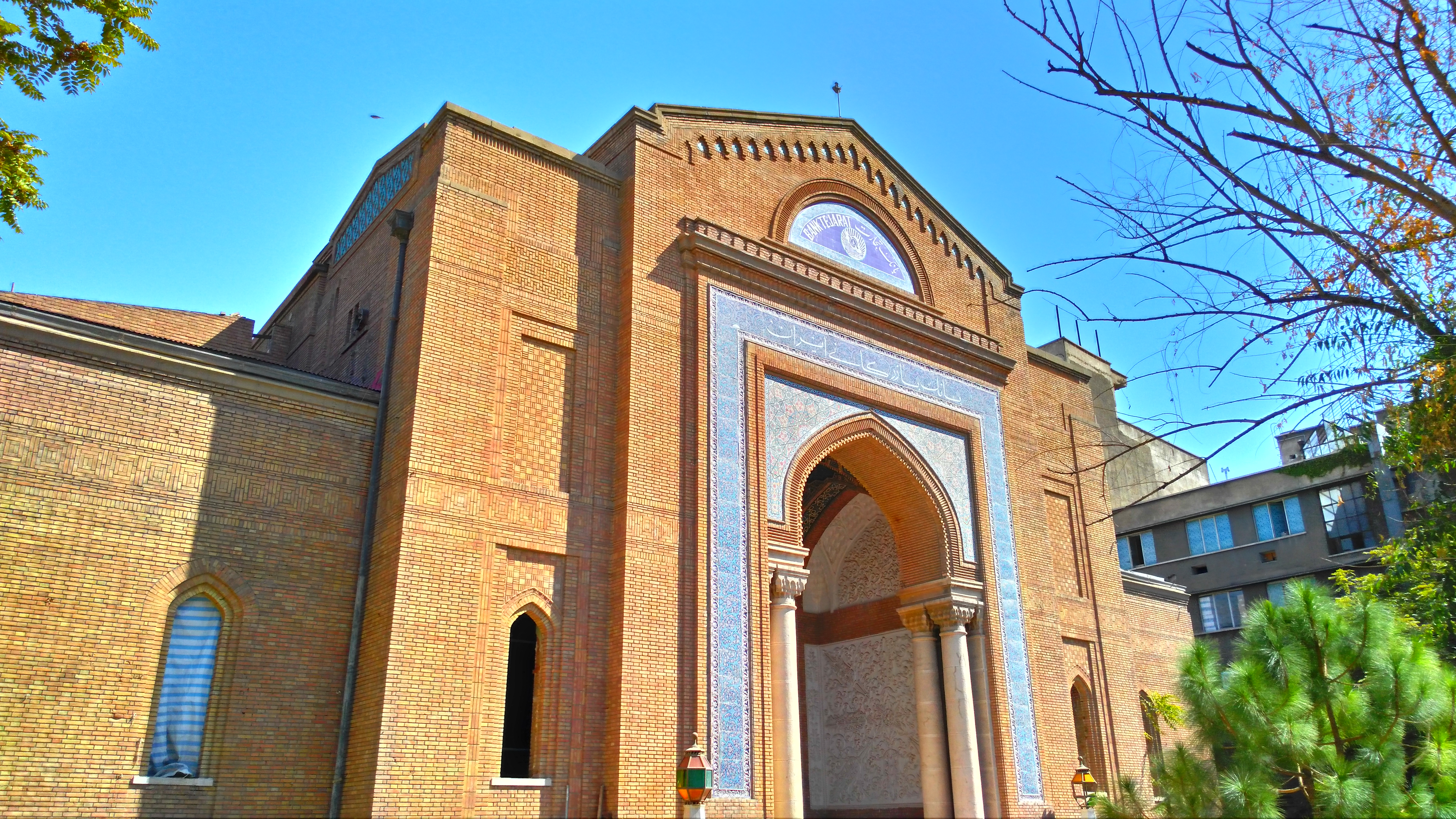

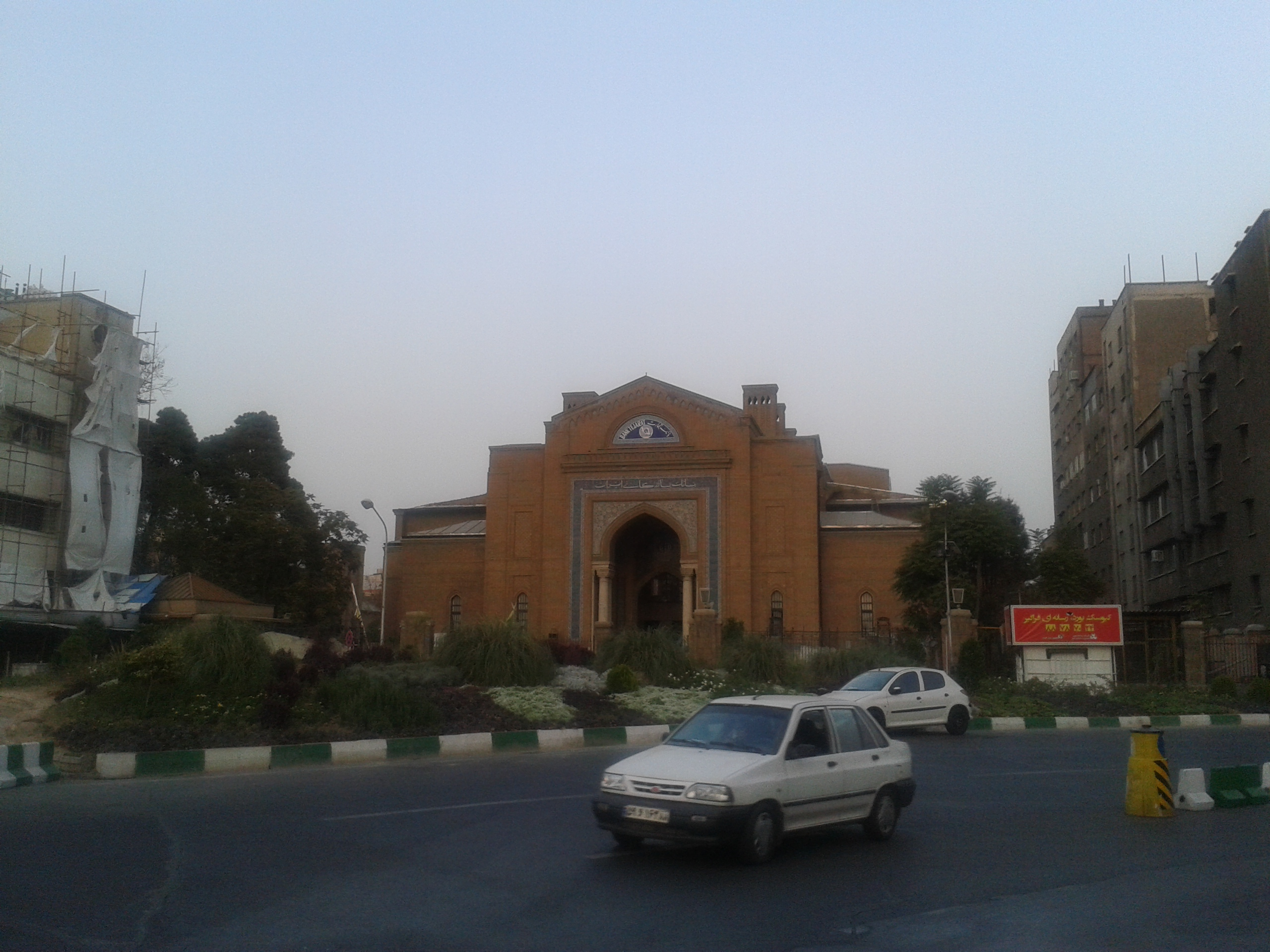

== See also ==
- Telegraphkhane
- Tehran Municipality Palace.
