= Imperial Bank of Persia =

Former London-headquartered bank

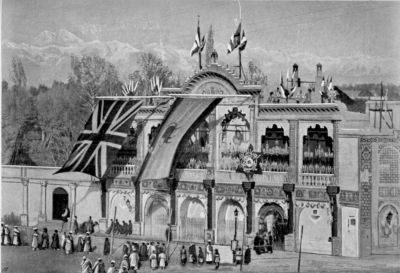
Imperial Bank of Persia head office on the eastern side of Toopkhaneh, Teheran, 1902

The Imperial Bank of Persia (Persian: بانک شاهنشاهی ایران, romanized: Bânk-e Šâhanšâhi-ye Irân), sometimes transcribed as Bank Shahi, was a British bank that played a central role in the financial history of late Qajar Iran, known in English at the time as Persia. The bank was legally established in London and subject to British law, with the bulk of its operations based in Tehran under a concession initially granted by the Qajar government to Paul Julius Reuter. It served as the country's main bank of issue until that role was transferred to Bank Melli Iran in 1932, and introduced European financial practices to a country in which they were previously unknown.

Following political changes in Pahlavi Iran it was renamed the Imperial Bank of Iran in 1935, then the British Bank of Iran and the Middle East in 1949 following expansion into other Middle Eastern countries. In 1952, its operations in Iran were terminated, with some of its former business restructured as Bank Bazargani. The remaining activity outside Iran was renamed British Bank of the Middle East (BBME), which in 1959 was purchased by HSBC and in 1999 was renamed HSBC Bank Middle East. Bank Bazargani in turn was reorganized in 1979 following the Iranian Revolution, to become the nucleus of Bank Tejarat.

== Background ==
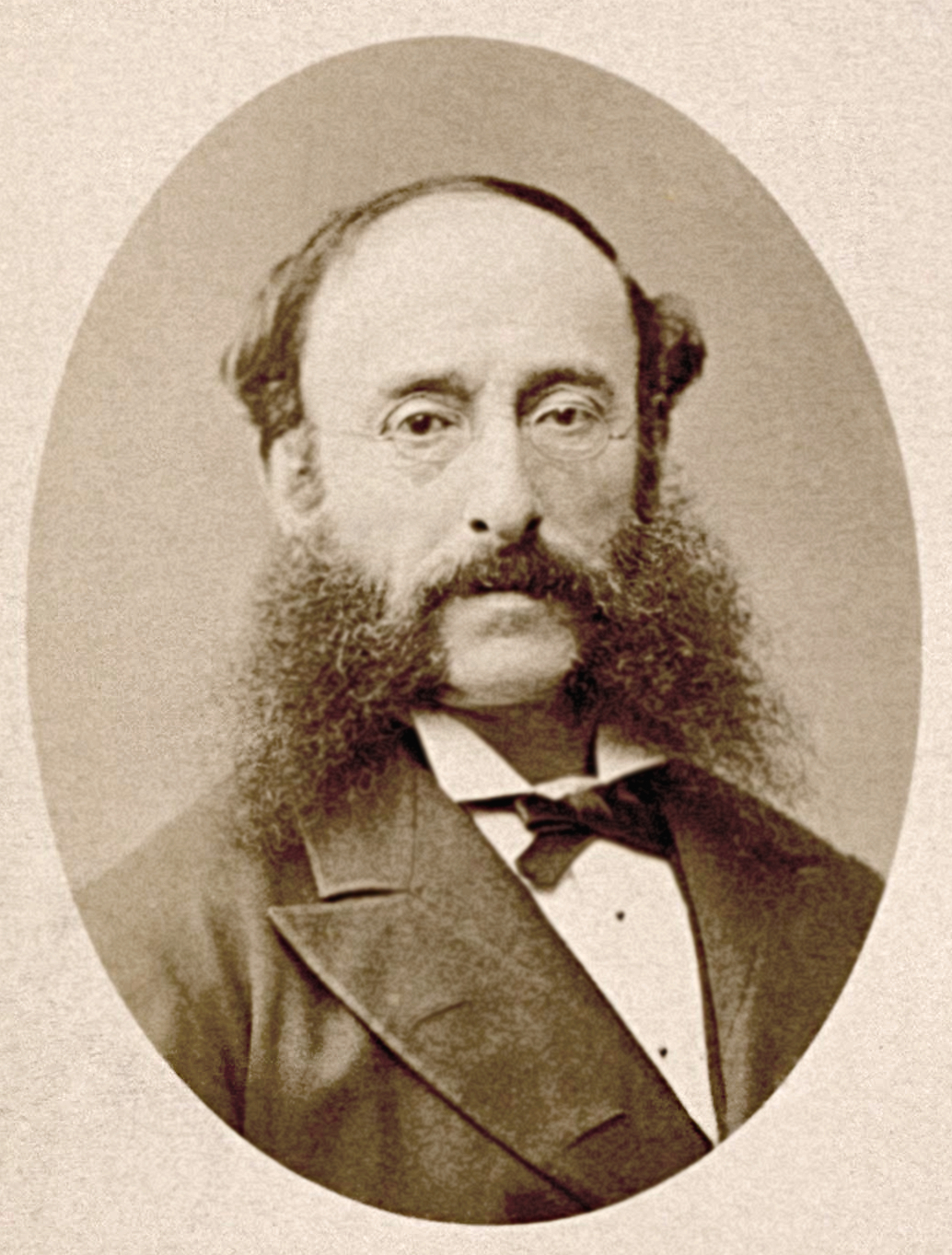
Paul Julius Reuter was the initiator of the Imperial Bank through its advocacy of the Reuter Concession in the 1870s and 1880s

Nineteenth-century Iran has been described as "one of the most backward countries in the world". As usury was forbidden under Islam, the traditional money lenders in Iran were mainly Jewish money-changers or sarrafs. The only form of money in circulation was gold and silver coins. A first attempt to create a modern European-style bank was the Oriental Bank Corporation, a British venture established in 1845 but which did not survive long. A successor entity, the New Oriental Bank Corporation, opened in 1884 but suspended its operations after a year. The New Oriental Bank Corporation (Bank Jadid Sharq) was again established in 1888 and opened branches in Tehran, Tabriz, Rasht, Mashhad, Isfahan, Shiraz, and Bushehr.

Paul Julius Reuter obtained the Reuter concession in 1872, entailing exclusive rights over many resources of Persia. While the main motivation for the concession was in order to develop railroads, it also gave Reuter a monopoly over banking for sixty years. The concession's leonine terms was resented by Iranian public opinion, alarmed Russia, and was also a concern for the British government which had been kept away from Reuter's negotiation until the last minute. Due to mounting pressure, the Shah cancelled the concession in 1873, invoking the fact that Reuter failed to initiate the railway project within 15 months as the text committed him to.

== Imperial Bank of Persia ==
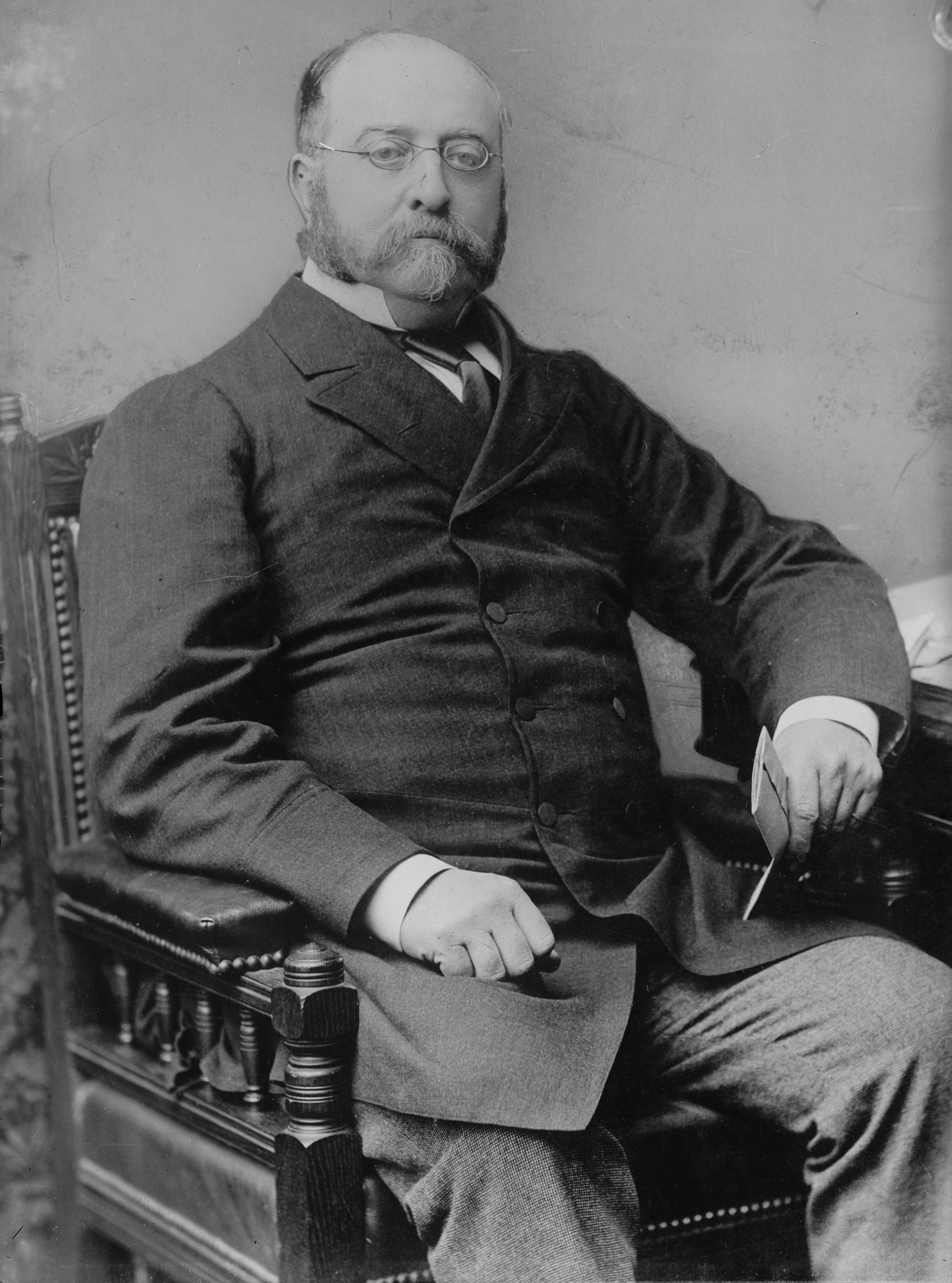
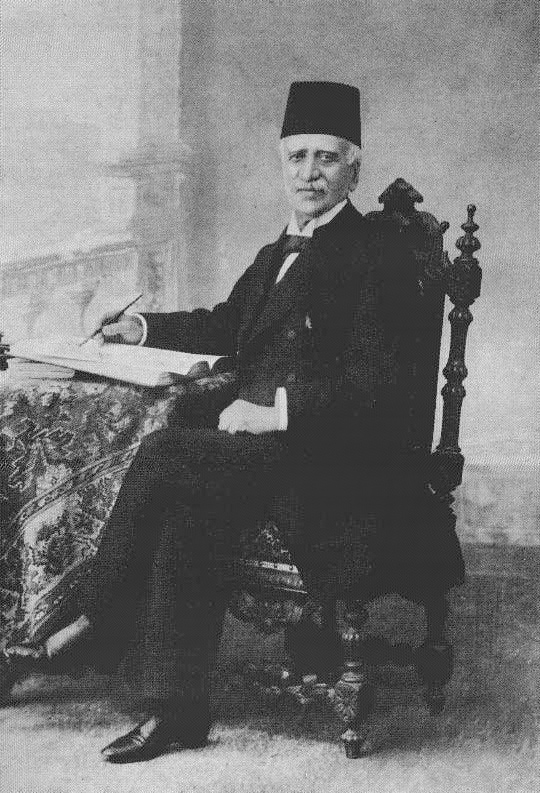
Henry Drummond Wolff and Mirza Malkam Khan, respectively the British minister in Tehran and his Persian counterpart in London, were instrumental in the revival of the Reuter Concession in 1889

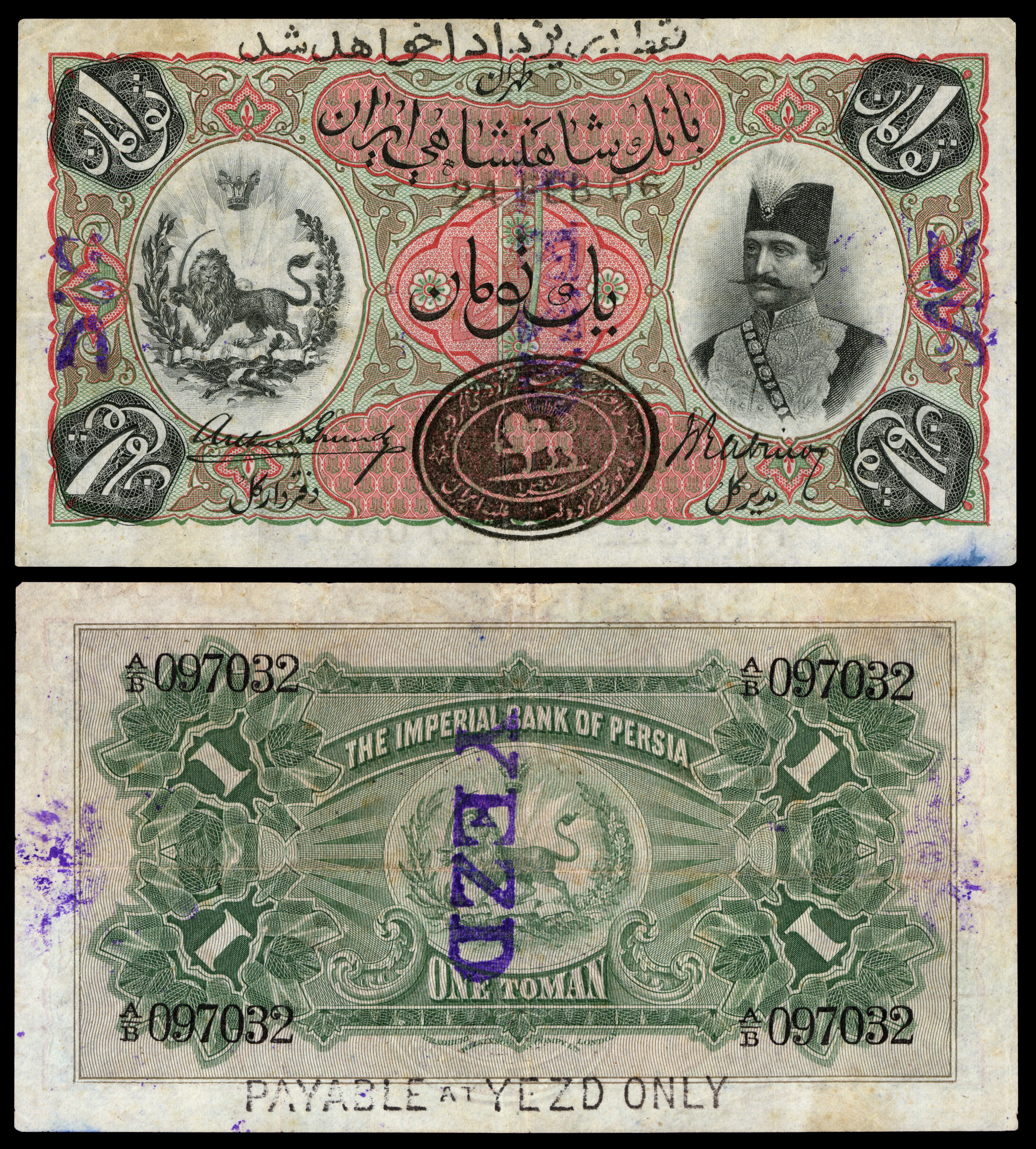
Imperial Bank of Persia "Qajar" note of one toman issued by the Inperial Bank branch in Yazd (1906), depicting Naser al-Din Shah Qajar

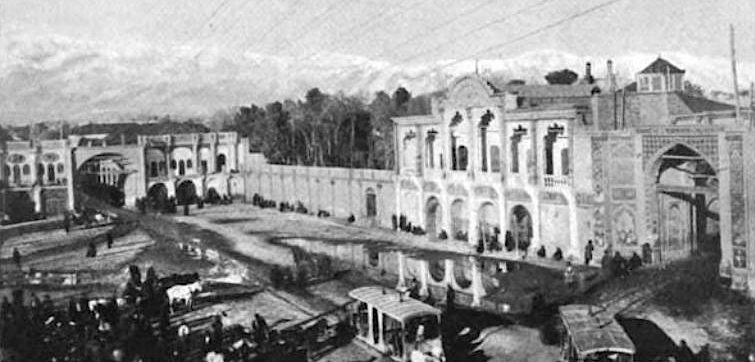
Imperial Bank building on Toopkhaneh (at right), Tehran, 1910

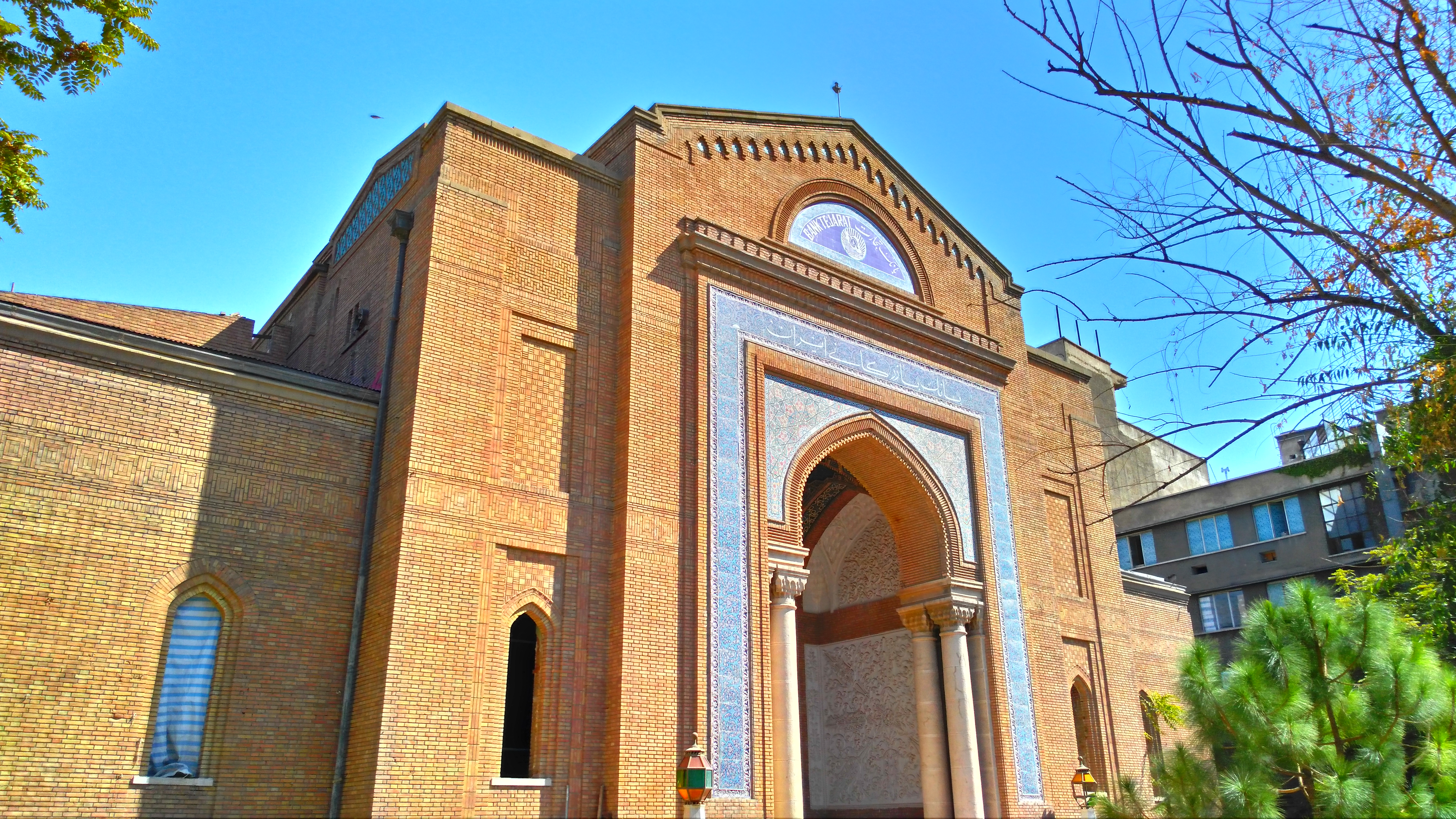
Imperial Bank building, Tehran, as rebuilt in 1929 and currently used by Bank Tejarat

Reuter did not give up however, and the negotiation gained renewed momentum with support of both Mirza Malkam Khan, Persia's minister in London, and Henry Drummond Wolff, the UK's minister in Tehran. Paul Julius Reuter's son George traveled to Tehran in October 1888 to renegotiate the concession on changed terms, downplaying the railways component following a pledge by the Shah in 1887 that he would not engage in railway construction without Russian approval. Eventually, the modified concession was signed on 30 January 1889 with no provisions on railways. Although this new concession was not as vast as the first one, it still granted Reuter valuable control over Persian banking and mining. Reuter then secured a royal charter from the UK government on 2 September 1889, the first such document issued for an overseas British bank since 1864. The Imperial Bank subsequently had its shares publicly floated in London, and started operations by opening its first branch in Tehran in December 1889. On the basis of the concession's terms, the operations of the New Oriental Bank were transferred to the Imperial Bank. The Imperial Bank's first banknotes were issued in 1890, ranging from 1 toman to 1,000 tomans. The oldest known was dated 25 October 1890.

Between 1890 and 1932, the Imperial Bank operated as the only bank of issue in Iran. It was dominant in providing modern financial services in Iran, but it was not alone on that market. To start with, the traditional moneylenders continued to dominate the field for some time after the Imperial Bank's arrival due to greater loan flexibility and cultural ties. In 1890, the Loan and Discount Bank of Persia was established to keep British financial influence in check, even though it never appeared to make profits in its subsequent three decades of operations. In 1907, the Anglo-Russian Convention, which split Iran into Russian and British spheres of influence, assigned to the Russian Loan and Discount Bank the revenues from the amortization of Persian debts in northern Iran, and the same for the British Imperial Bank in southern Iran.

The bank was initially funded mostly by Glyn, Mills & Co., J. Henry Schröder & Co. and David Sassoon & Co. Sir William Keswick was its first chairman. Its first chief executive ("chief manager") was Joseph Rabino, born in London to an Italian father and thus viewed in London as a bit of an outsider. Rabino served eighteen years in Persia and was instrumental in building up the bank's reputation. The Imperial Bank did not employ locals as managers, in contrast with the Imperial Ottoman Bank, but nevertheless played a role in the financial education of business elites in Iran.

At the time, Persians were wary of giving up silver and gold coins for paper notes. Rabino directed all branches to keep enough silver coins to be able to redeem paper notes for silver on demand. Even so, local bank runs did occur in the early years of the bank, sometimes instigated by Russian agents. The bank issued only small notes in the early years to be able to redeem the notes for silver even in the remote areas. With the protection of Persian soldiers, the bank supplied even remote branches with enough silver coins. The bank relied on support from general Albert Houtum-Schindler in Tehran who was, like Reuter, a British subject of German origin. Schindler had lived in Persia for many years and was the most informed member of the European community in Persia at the time; Henry Drummond Wolff tried unsuccessfully to persuade the foreign office to engage him as a member of Legation staff, and Reuter employed him instead.

Beyond Tehran, the Imperial Bank developed a network of branches, most of which issued location-specific banknotes which the bank was only obliged to reimburse in specie at the respective branch; the notes could also be redeemed in other cities but were then discounted, typically by one or two percents. These provisions forced the Imperial Bank to keep large amounts of specie in local branches, often over 60 percent of the respective banknotes' value. The banknotes were printed in London, shipped to Tehran, stamped there with the relevant branch name by the Bank in the presence of a commissioner representing the Persian government, and transported on to the branch. In total, the bank issued notes for twenty-seven different branches from 1890 to 1932. The branch in the Grand Bazaar of Tehran, opened in 1899, was an outlier as it did not issue banknotes of its own. Outside of Tehran, branches opened in Tabriz and Bushehr (April 1890), Isfahan (June 1890), Mashhad (April 1891), Shiraz (May 1891), Yazd and Rasht (May 1893), Kermanshah (September 1902), Zabol (then known as Nasratabad, November 1903), Kerman (March 1904), Hamadan (October 1909), Khorramshahr (then known as Mohammerah, December 1909), Qazvin (January 1911), Ahvaz (March 1911), Arak (then known as Soltân Âbâd, January 1913), Birjand (September 1913), Sabzevar (September 1914), Zanjan (1918), Bandar Abbas (1919), Shushtar (1921), Zahedan (then known as Duzdab, April 1922), Babol (then known as Barforush, May 1923), Masjed Soleyman (then known as Maydan-Nafton, June 1923), Borujerd (February 1926), Bandar-e Anzali (known in the meantime as Pahlavi, August 1926), Abadan (September 1926), and finally Dezful (December 1928). The Imperial Bank also opened agencies abroad in Baghdad, Basra and Calcutta, which however had no banknotes of their own.

Based on its published accounts, the bank was not highly profitable, and struggled to attract professional management from the UK. As academic Geoffrey Jones, a scholar of the bank, has emphasized, however, British banks in this period were allowed to disguise their profits by making transfers to or from "inner" or "secret" reserves before reaching their published profits figure. Thus, the Imperial bank's real profits were on average twice as high as the published profits between 1890 and 1952.

The Imperial Bank was instrumental in providing British loans to the Qajar government between 1892 and 1919. These loans were secured by revenue from Caspian fisheries and the custom dues of the Persian Gulf ports, raising the alarm of Persian nationalists. Beyond providing financial resources, the bank also participated in efforts to reform the Persian financial administration.

Following the turmoil during and after World War I, the Imperial Bank faced a transformed environment. Following the Russian Revolution, the Soviet authorities liquidated the entire Russian banking system and subsequently terminated the activity of the Russian Loan and Discount Bank, whose residual operations they handed over to the Persian authorities in 1921. Conversely, following up on the Ottoman incursions into western Iran during the Persian campaign, the Imperial Ottoman Bank entered the Persian markets in 1919-1922 by opening branches in Kermanshah, then Abadan and Tehran.

The bank contributed to the Iranian economy by mobilizing domestic savings, but many were doubtful of the real use of these savings and the Bank was accused of discriminating against Persians in giving credit. In 1927, 80 percent of the loans granted by the Imperial Bank in Bushehr, Shiraz and Isfahan were to finance Iranian export of opium, whereas most of the loans in the northern cities related to the trade with Russia.

Following the 1921 Persian coup d'état and the 1925 establishment of the Pahlavi dynasty, the nationalist sentiment in Iran favored the creation of a domestic banking system, the first element of which was the army-connected Bank Sepah in May 1925. Already in 1922, the future Reza Shah had disparaged the Imperial Bank as "Lord Curzon's Bank of Persia". Bank Melli Iran was established in 1928 with intent to take over the note-issuing monopoly role. After some delay, Bank Melli issued its first banknotes in March 1932, and the Imperial Bank's banknotes were officially withdrawn in September 1932. Overall, the Imperial Bank's notes were issued in two successive series, one lasting from 1890 to 1924 printed by Bradbury Wilkinson and Company, and the second from 1924 to 1932 printed by Bradbury Wilkinson and by Waterlow and Sons, both in London. Given the shifting Iranian politics, both series bore the portrait of Naser al-Din Shah Qajar even long after he was assassinated in 1896, for which the notes remained known as "Qajar" even after the dynasty's demise. The notes also bore the ancient Persian symbol of the Lion and Sun, with text in Persian on the obverse and English on the reverse.

== Imperial Bank of Iran ==
The bank was renamed Imperial Bank of Iran in 1935, adopting the new name of Iran. In the 1930s, exchange controls and barter agreements severely affected its business in financing foreign trade. The Imperial Bank rapidly lost market share to Bank Melli, and by 1939 it held only 9 percent of Iranian bank deposits. The bank sold off half of its branches in the 1930s.

== British Bank of Iran and the Middle East ==
In the 1940s, the Imperial Bank opened branches in the Persian Gulf States, and was the first bank in Kuwait, Dubai, and Oman. In February 1949, at the expiration of Reuter's 60-year concession, it renamed itself the British Bank of Iran and the Middle East (BBIME). It subsequently continued to operate without its former concessional privileges.

== Bank Bazargani ==
As a result of the anti-colonialism campaigns of the Iranian government led by Mohammad Mosaddegh and the statement of Ayatollah Kashani on 20 September 1951, the environment became increasingly difficult for the BBIME. It stopped business in Iran in August 1952. On 7 November 1952, a new domestically-owned bank named Bank Bazargani purchased its operations for an amount of IRR 36,000,000. The capital of Bank Bazargani was IRR 1,500,000,000 divided into 150,000 registered shares of IRR 10,000 each, all of which were paid.

By 20 March 1978, Bank Bazargani had 102 branches in Tehran, 140 branches in other cities of Iran, two branches outside the country (Hamburg and London), and a total of 3801 employees.

Following the Iranian Revolution in 1979, Bank Bazargani was merged with several other credit institutions to form the state-owned Bank Tejarat.

== British Bank of the Middle East ==
The BBIME renamed itself the British Bank of the Middle East in 1952 following its departure from Iran. In 1960, it was acquired by HSBC in a friendly takeover.

== Aftermath ==
Following its takeover of BBME, HSBC commissioned an in-depth historical review of the Imperial Bank and its successor entities, which was led by scholar Geoffrey Jones and published in 1986-1987.

== Leadership ==
- Joseph Rabino, chief manager October 1889-August 1908
- A.O. Wood, chief manager 1909-1919
- James H. McMurry, chief manager 1919-1925
- Edward Wilkinson, chief manager 1925-1934

== See also ==
- Banking and Insurance in Iran
- Central Bank of Iran
- Ottoman Bank
- History of Iran–United Kingdom relations
