= Bank Mellat =

Iranian banking and financial services corporation

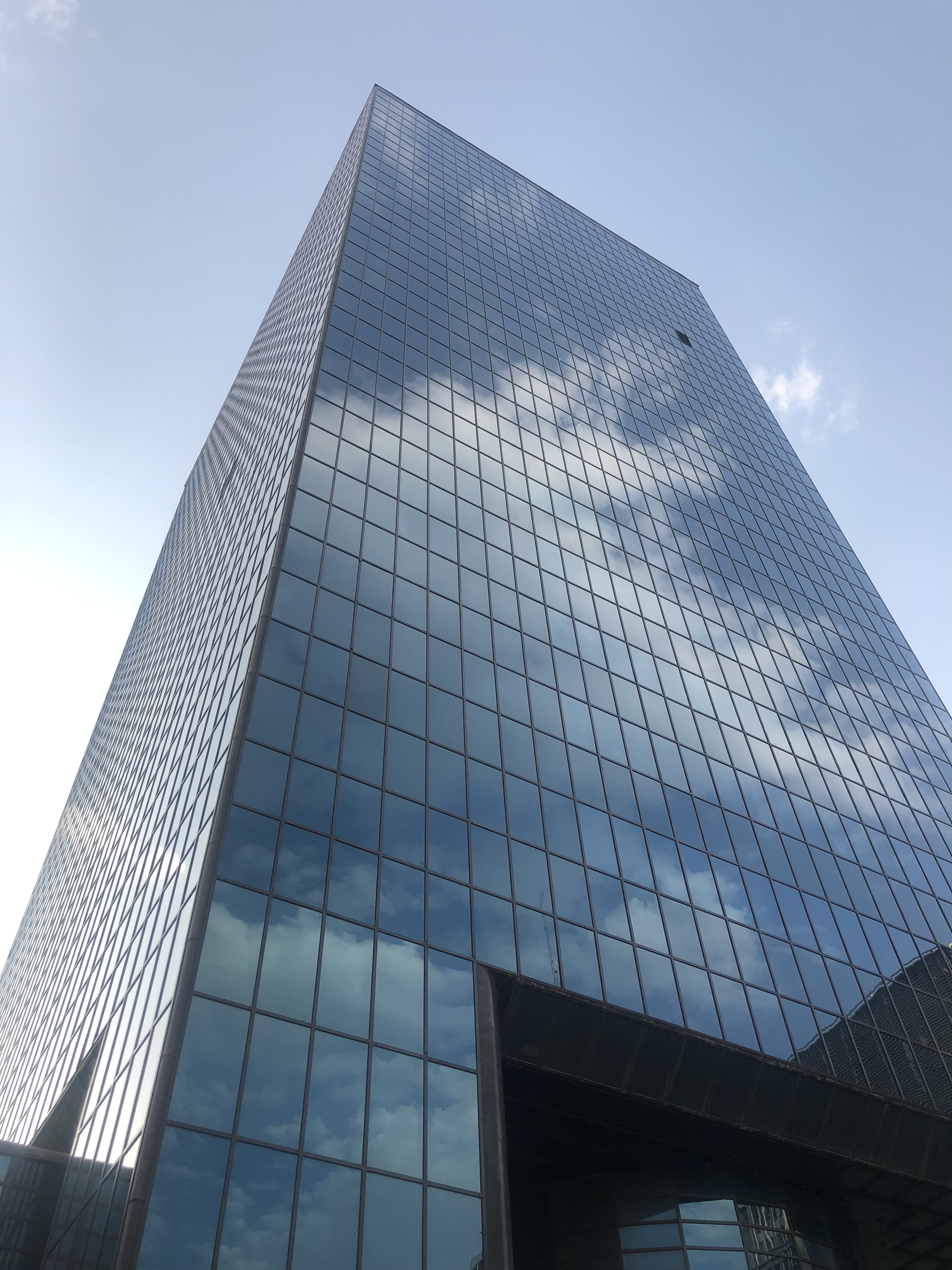
- Bank Mellat's headquarters in Tehran, Iran
- Company type: Public
- Traded as: TSE: BMLT1
- ISIN: IRO1BMLT0007
- Industry: Banking; Financial services Insurance
- Predecessor: Bank Pars; Tehran Bank; Omran Bank; Farhangian Bank; Darius Bank
- Founded: July 22, 1980; 43 years ago
- Headquarters: 327 Takhte Jamshid (Taleqani) St, Tehran, Iran
- Area served: Worldwide
- Key people: Farshid Farrokhnejad (CEO)
- Products: Consumer banking, corporate banking, finance and insurance, investment banking, mortgage loans, private banking, private equity, wealth management, credit cards,
- Revenue: US$6.761 billion (2016)
- Total assets: US$ 280 billion (2023)
- Owner: Government of Islamic Republic of Iran (%16.99) Atieh Mellat Fund (%6.44) Saba Tamin Investment Co. (%5.57)
- Number of employees: 19,876 (2019)
- Subsidiaries: Persia International Bank
- Website: en.bankmellat.ir

Bank Mellat (Persian: بانک ملت, Bānk-e Mellat, lit. People's Bank) is one of the most active Iranian banks. Its name means "Bank of the Nation". The bank was established in 1980, with a paid capital of 33.5 billion Rials as a merger of ten pre-1979 revolution private banks, comprising Tehran, Dariush, Pars, Etebarat Taavoni & Tozie, Iran & Arab, Bein-al-melalie-Iran, Omran, Bimeh Iran, Tejarat Khareji Iran and Farhangian.

The bank's capital amounted to Rls 13,100 billion and it was one of the largest commercial banks in Iran, ranking among the top 1000 banks of the world.

In 2007 the Iranian government started the process of privatising the bank as part of a policy of selling 80% of state-owned stakes in banking, media, transportation and mining companies.

The Bank Mellat London branch was merged with the Bank Tejarat branch to form Persia International Bank PLC.

== Sanctions and court actions ==
The United States Department of the Treasury has mentioned Bank Mellat and Persia International in their watchlist of Iranian banks which may be trading in violation of UN Security Council Resolution 1803.

On 29 January 2013, the European General Court in Luxembourg ruled to annul the European Union sanctions in place since 2010 against Bank Mellat on grounds of supporting the Iranian nuclear and missile programs, stating that the basic rights of the bank had been denied and there was no evidence supporting the claim. Bank Mellat intends to sue for damages. On 18 February 2016, the Court of Justice of the European Union concurred with the General Court decision that the reasons given for sanctions were too vague.

A related action in the British courts was taken to the Supreme Court of the United Kingdom in March 2013, causing the court to hold a closed hearing for the first time. In June 2013, the Supreme Court ruled that the UK government's sanctions on the bank had been unlawful with one justice stating that targeting Bank Mellat was "irrational and disproportionate". Bank Mellat is claiming damages from the UK government for the loss of business between 2009 and 2013. The damages hearing was scheduled for June 2019, with Bank Mellat seeking damages of $1.7 billion. On the first day of the trial the parties agreed a settlement for a confidential sum. The Times later reported that £1.25 billion plus interest was paid to Bank Mellat, through a third country entity to avoid US sanctions. However the British government stated in parliament "the amount paid in respect of the settlement was €91,352,709.35", plus £1 million for legal costs.
