= Russo-Iranian Bank =

Former bank in Iran

- Native name: بانک روس و ایران; Русско-иранский банк
- Formerly: Russo-Persian Banking Office for Credit and Payment Services for Trade Between Iran and the USSR and Assistance to the Development of Iranian Agriculture and Industry
- Company type: State owned enterprise
- Industry: Financial services
- Founded: 1923
- Founder: local merchants and Reza Khan
- Defunct: 1981
- Fate: Merged into Bank Tejarat
- Headquarters: Tehran, Iran
- Area served: Iran
- Products: Banking services, business loans
- Owner: Government of the Soviet Union

The Russo-Iranian Bank (RIB), Russian: Русско-иранский банк, Persian: بانک روس و ایران), also known a Rusiranbank (Русиранбанк), known before 1935 as Banque Russo-Persane (Русско-персидский банк) or Ruspersbank (Русперсбанк), was a Soviet-sponsored bank headquartered in Tehran.

== History ==
A few days after the 1921 Persian coup d'état, the Russo-Persian Treaty of Friendship was signed on 26 February 1921 in Moscow at the instigation of Reza Khan and of the Soviet authorities. Under that treaty, the Russia-owned Loan and Discount Bank of Persia was handed over to the new Persian authorities.

The RIB was originally established in September 1923 as the Russo-Persian Banking Office for Credit and Payment Services for Trade Between Iran and the USSR and Assistance to the Development of Iranian Agriculture and Industry (Russian: Российско-персидское банковское управление по кредитным и платежным услугам для торговли между Ираном и СССР и содействие развитию сельского хозяйства и промышленности Ирана). Its founders were a mix of local merchants and the Russo-Asian Joint-Stock Company (Russian: Русско-Азиатское Акционерное Общество), an entity based in Moscow; its head of security was Reza Khan himself.

In February 1932, the Russo-Persian Banking Office changed its name to Russo-Persian Bank, then in 1935 to Russo-Iranian Bank adopting the new name of Iran. By 1934, it was one of the largest banks in Iran and had an extensive network of branches throughout the country. In 1938, 40% of Iran's trade was with the Soviet Union and the RIB was pivotal to that.

During the Second World War, in connection with the actual cessation of Iranian foreign trade, the RIB's capital sharply was reduced in 1944.

In 1954, all the original Iranian shareholders had been bought out by their Soviet partners; the Foreign Trade Bank of the USSR held an 84 percent stake in the RIB, while the State Bank of the USSR held the remaining 16 percent. The RIB also had correspondent accounts with Deutsche Bank and Chase Manhattan. From 1967, the bank experienced rapid growth with the intensification of Soviet-Iranian relations.

The bank was nationalized in June 1980 in the wake of the Iranian Revolution. On 15 May 1981, it was merged into the recently formed Bank Tejarat.

== See also ==
- Moscow Narodny Bank
- Donau Bank
- Ost-West Handelsbank
- East-West United Bank
- Banque Commerciale pour l'Europe du Nord – Eurobank
- Banking in the Soviet Union
