= Telegraphkhane =

Demolished structure in Tehran, Iran

Telegraphkhaneh building
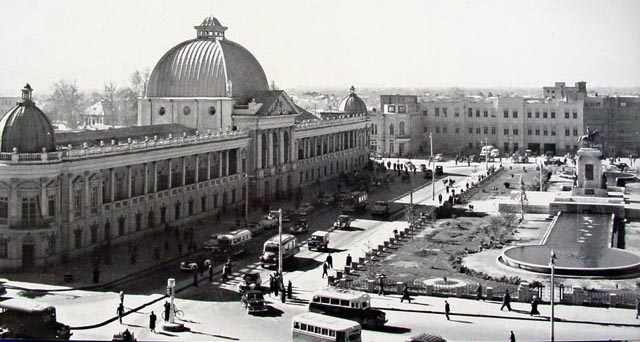

- Location within Tehran Location within Iran
- 35.6851°N 51.4215°E
- Location: Tehran, Iran

History
- Demolished: 1970

The Telegraphkhaneh building (Persian: ساختمان تلگرافخانه), or the Postkhaneh building (ساختمان پستخانه), was a building in Tehran, Iran, that was used as museum of post and telegraph. It was constructed during the reign of Reza Shah in Toopkhaneh square, and was demolished in 1970.

== History ==
After Reza Shah's coronation, Karim Buzarjomehri became the mayor of Tehran. As his first action, he redesigned the Toopkhaneh Square with the help a Russian architect inspired by a city square in Saint Petersburg.

The Telegraphkhaneh building was created in three parts and was around 150 meters long, and faced the Tehran Municipality Palace. It had a columned entrance with a dome that had a square base. The building had 22 decorated columns that gave it a very spectacular look.

It was demolished in 1970 for unknown reasons, just like the Municipality Palace.

== Gallery ==
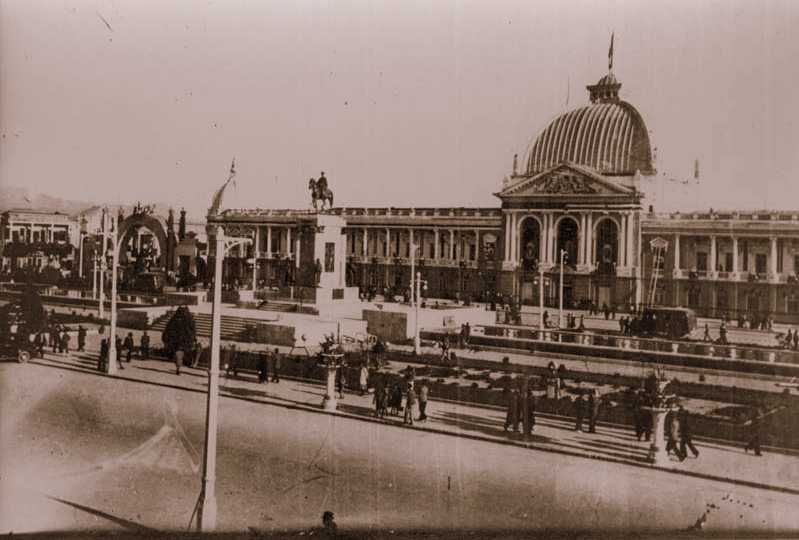

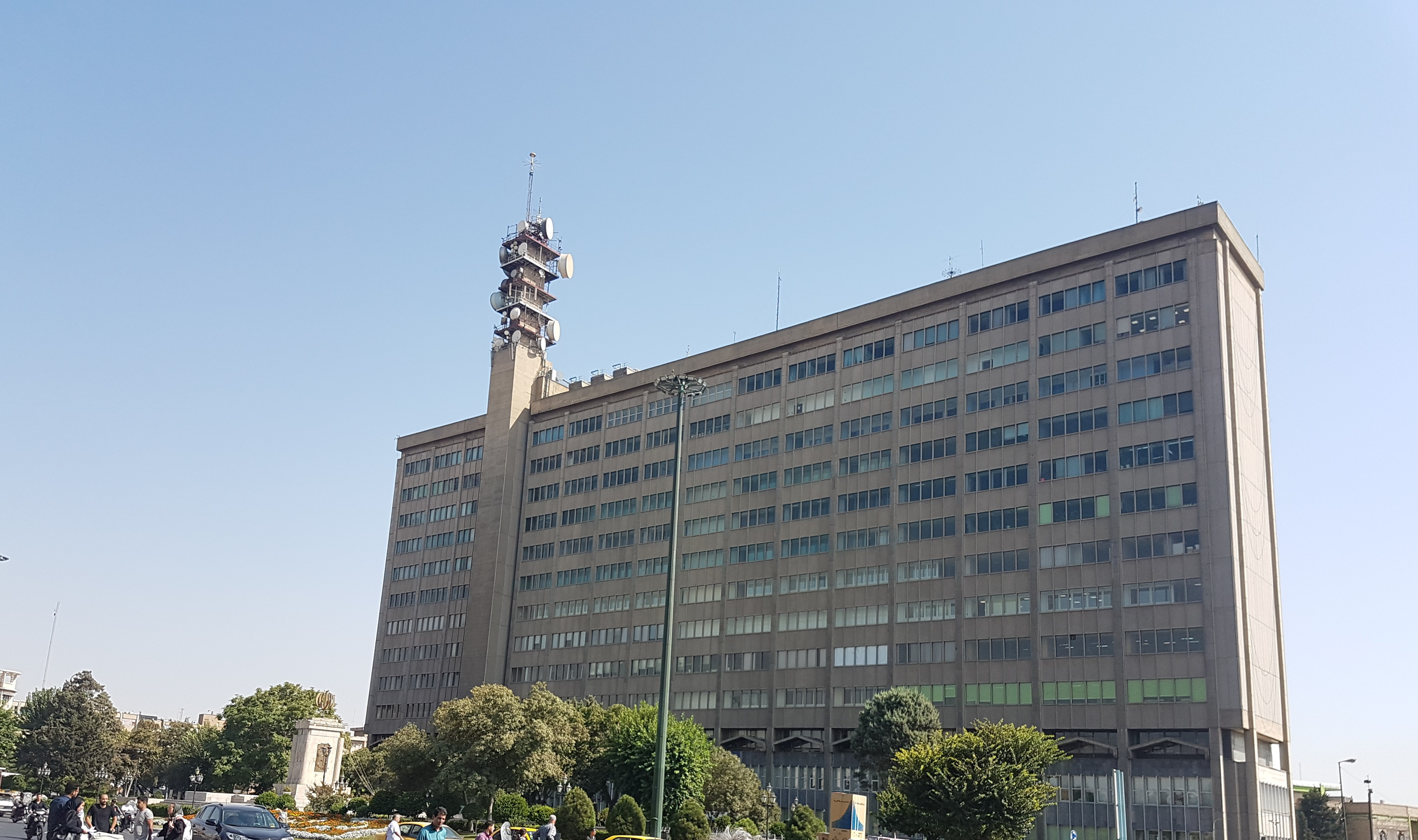
The building that replaced Telegraphkhane after it was destroyed.

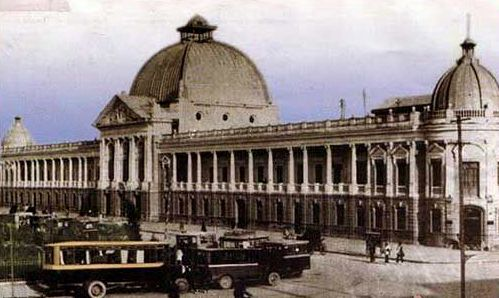

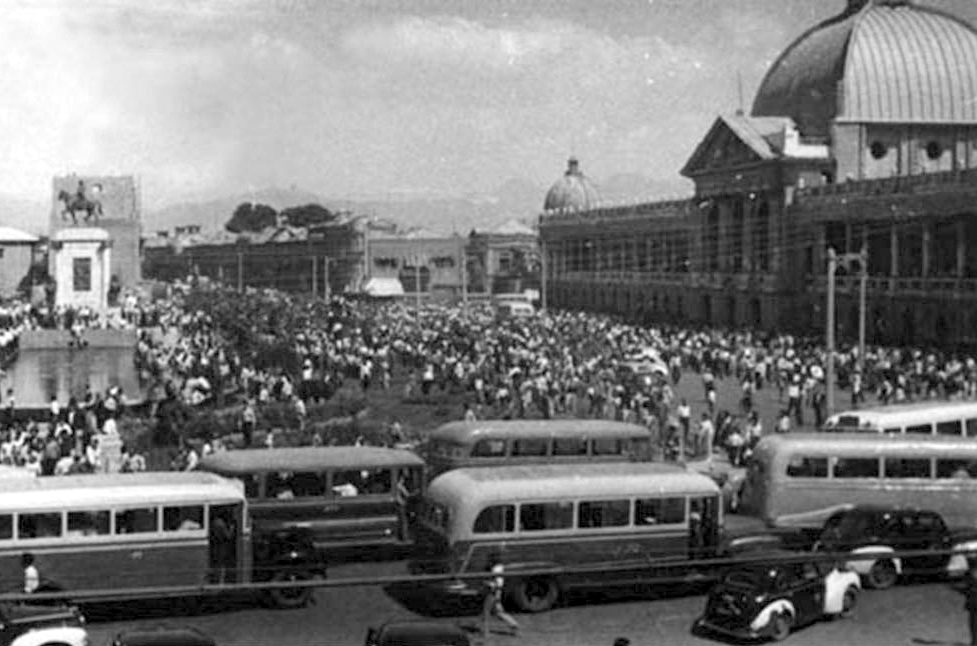
Tudeh Party demonstrations in front of the Telegraphkhaneh, August 1953

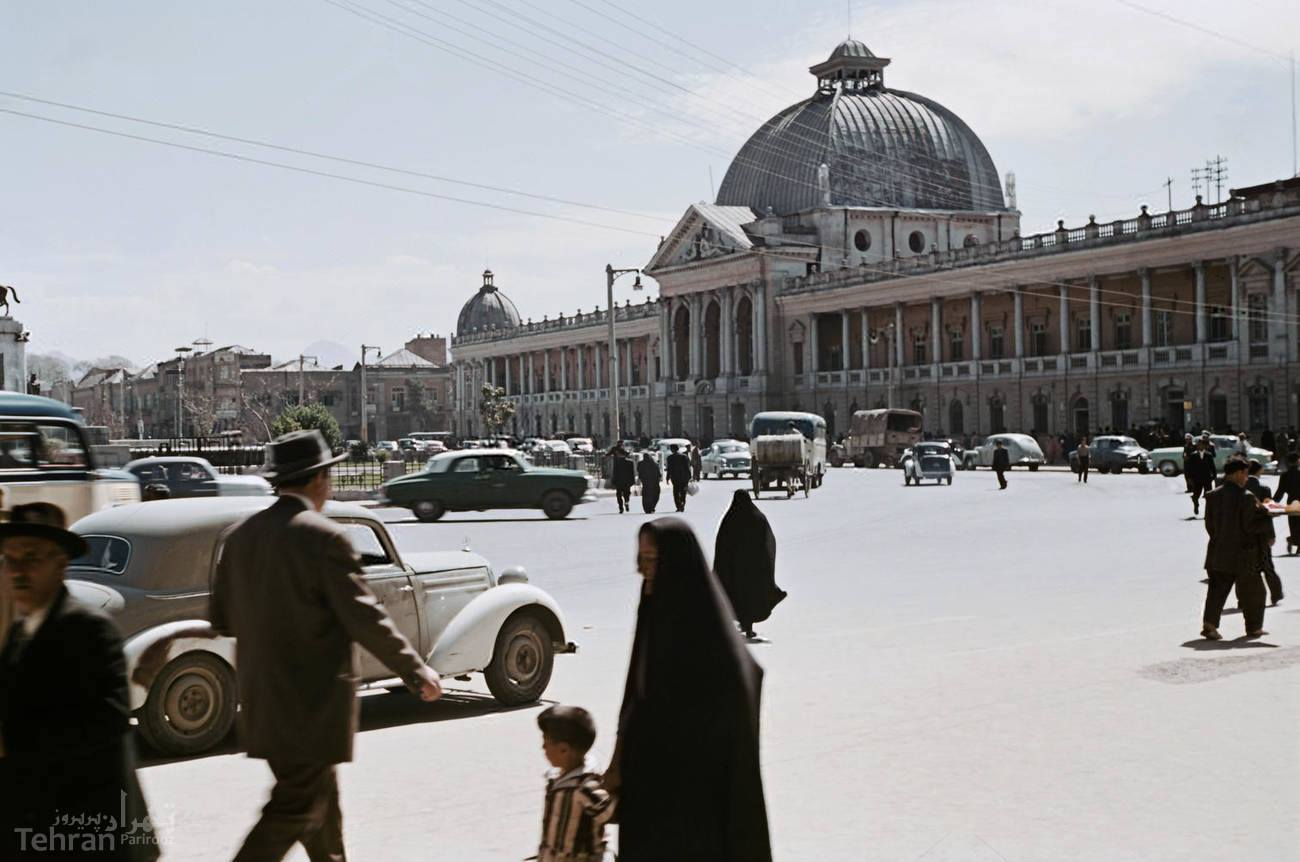
Telegraphkhaneh in the 1950s

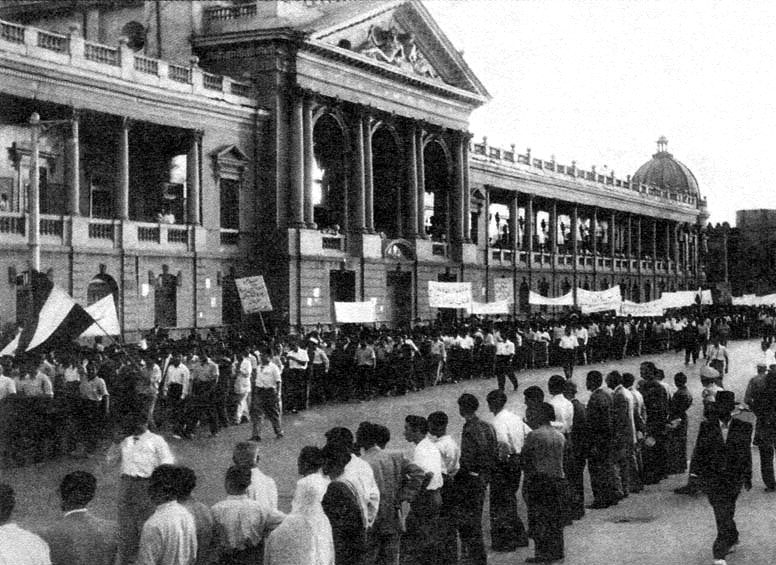
Supporters of nationalisation of Iranian oil demonstrating in front of the building, early 1950s
