= Loan and Discount Bank of Persia =

Former bank in Qajar Iran

- Native name: بانک استقراضی ایران
- Formerly: Loan Society of Persia
- Type: Private company
- Industry: Financial services
- Founded: 1890
- Founder: Yakov Solomonovich Polyakov
- Defunct: 1921
- Fate: Handed over by the Russian government to the government of Persia
- Successor: Bank of Iran and later Bank Keshavarzi Iran
- Headquarters: Tehran, Iran
- Area served: Persia
- Products: Banking services, business loans
- Owner: Russian government

The Loan and Discount Bank of Persia (Persian: بانک استقراضی ایران Bānk-e Esteqrāżī-e Rūs, Russian: Учётно-Ссудный Банк Персии, French: banque de prêts et d'escompte de Perse - the bank was widely referred to by its French name) was a bank established in late Qajar Iran to foster Russian interests in the country in response to British influence and specifically the 1889 establishment of the Imperial Bank of Persia. The bank's activity, concentrated in Northern Iran, lasted until 1921, when its residual operations were reorganized as a domestic institution.

== History ==
The Loan Society of Persia (Russian: Ссудное общество Персии) was created by Russian merchant Yakov Solomonovich Polyakov, who in 1890 negotiated a 75-year concession from the Qajar government to establish a loan bank. It was initially a private-sector company, capitalized with 2 million French francs. Around the same time, Yakov's younger brother Lazar Polyakov opened a branch of his Moscow International Commercial Bank in Tehran.

the Loan Society soon struggled financially, and was purchased in 1894 by the Russian government under the expansionist policy of Sergei Witte who had concluded that the State Bank of the Russian Empire could not open a Persian branch of its own without provoking British pushback. The Russian Empire subsequently owned the bank, renamed as Loan Bank of Persia (Ссудный банк Персии), via the Ministry of Finance, and delegated its management to the Russian embassy in Tehran. In practice, the Loan Bank operated as a foreign branch of Russia's State Bank. It was thus principally an instrument of Russian government policy, and it does not appear to have ever been profitable. In particular, it was a key financial supporter of the Persian Cossack Brigade.

The bank accepted deposits and lent to merchants (mainly for trade with Russia), officials, and to the Iranian government. In the latter capacity, it notably led a major loan to the Qajar government in 1900, for 2.5 million rubles (ca. 2.3 million pounds sterling), refinancing the 1892 loan that had been made by the British-controlled Imperial Bank of Persia. It also engaged in predatory behavior against Russian private-sector business in Persia, effectively leading to much of the latter being nationalized by the Russian state. Its activity, however, was severely curtailed in the aftermath of the Russian Revolution of 1905 which led Russian finances into severe distress.

Following the 1917 revolution in Russia, the Soviet authorities terminated all banking activity in Russia. In 1921, they turned over the Loan and Discount Bank to the Iranian authorities. Then Persian finance minister Mohammad Mosaddegh reorganized it as Bank of Iran and entrusted its management to veteran Qajar official Morteza Khan Momtaz al-Molk. In 1933, the Bank of Iran was absorbed by the Agricultural and Industrial Bank (later branded Bank Keshavarzi Iran), which had just been spun off from Bank Melli Iran.

== See also ==
- Moscow Narodny Bank
- Russo-Iranian Bank
