= Persia International Bank =

- Company type: Public Company
- Industry: Banking; Financial services Insurance
- Founded: 29 April 2002; 24 years ago
- Headquarters: London, United Kingdom
- Area served: Worldwide
- Products: consumer banking, corporate banking, finance and insurance, investment banking, mortgage loans, private banking, private equity, savings, Securities, asset management, wealth management, Credit cards
- Parent: Mellat Bank, Tejarat Bank
- Website: persiabank.co.uk

Persia International Bank plc commenced trading in London on 29 April 2002, following the merger of the London branches of Bank Mellat and Bank Tejarat, which are joint shareholders in Persia International Bank.

== Sanctions and court actions ==
The United States Department of the Treasury mentioned Persia International in their 2008 watchlist of Iranian banks which may be trading in violation of UN Security Council Resolution 1803.

On 6 September 2013, the European General Court in Luxembourg ruled to annul the European Union sanctions in place since 2010 against the bank on grounds of supporting the Iranian nuclear and missile programs, as EU governments had incorrectly assessed the facts and evidence.
