= Iranians' Bank =

Defunct Iranian bank that operated 1960-1979

- Type: Private company
- Industry: Financial services
- Founded: 1960
- Defunct: 1979
- Fate: Nationalised after the 1979 Iranian revolution
- Successor: Bank Tejarat
- Headquarters: Tehran, Iran
- Area served: Iran
- Key people: Ebtehaj Sanee and Azar Sanee
- Products: Banking services

Iranians' Bank, also called Bank Iranian, was an Iranian public private bank based in Tehran. It was established in 1960 and disbanded after the 1979 revolution.

The bank had four general offices and seven branches in principal Iranian cities.

It was headed by Ebtehaj Sanee (considered the father of modern Iranian budget program) and Azar Sanee, his wife and the first Iranian woman banker. All the branches were ordered to display a picture of the Shah by Ebtehaj.

== History ==
Initially Citibank International's First National City Bank had bought 35 percent of the shares for around $1 million; later their share was reduced to 5%.

In 1979, Iranians' Bank was nationalized and merged into Tejarat.
