= Tehran Municipality Palace =

Demolished structure in Tehran, Iran

- عمارت شهرداری تهران
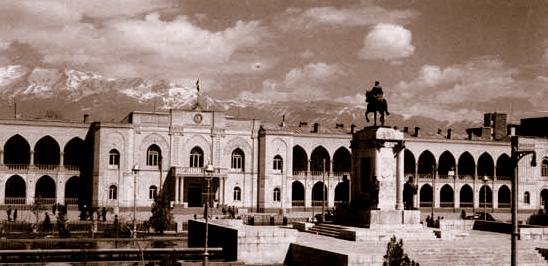
- Interactive map of the Tehran Municipality Palace area

General information
- Status: Demolished
- Location: Tehran, Iran

The Tehran Municipality Palace (Persian: عمارت شهرداری تهران) was a building in Toopkhaneh Square, Tehran, Iran. It served as the office for Tehran municipality for over 4 decades before its demolition in 1969.

== History ==
After the 1921 coup in Iran that led to Zia ol Din Tabatabaee becoming prime minister of Iran, an Armenian named Kasbar Ipegian became the acting mayor of Tehran. Ipegian ordered the construction of a municipality building in Toopkhaneh Square to centralize affairs in the city. After Reza Khan was crowned Shah of Iran in 1925, Karim Buzarjomehri became the mayor of Tehran and the building was completed. The building was demolished in 1969 for unknown reasons.

== Gallery ==
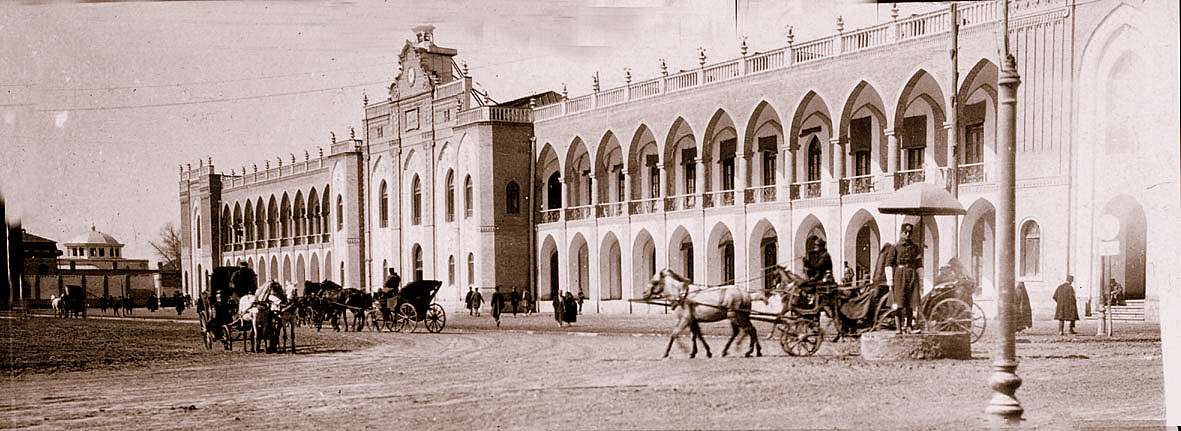
The Municipality Palace in the 1930s and 40s

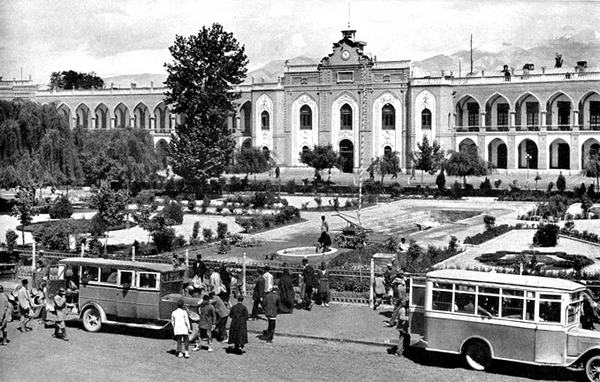

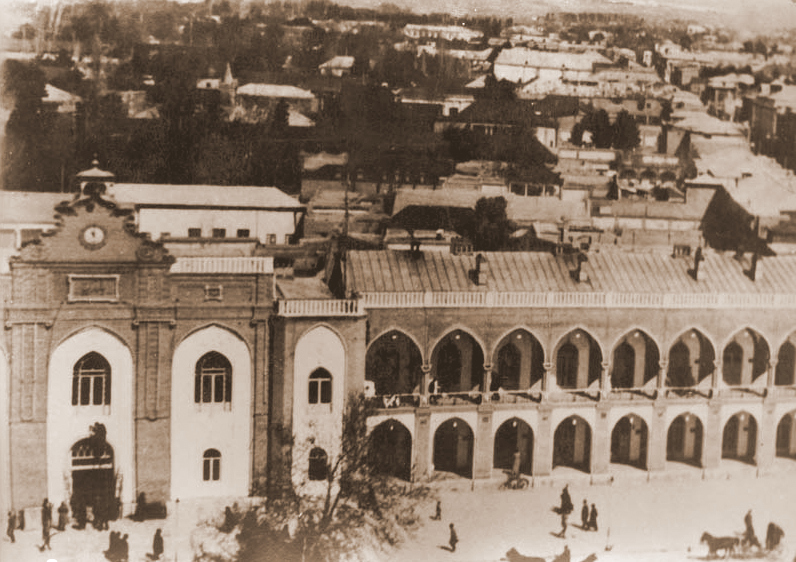
The Municipality Palace in the 1930s
