= Karim Buzarjomehri =

Imperial Iranian General

Timsar Karim Buzarjomehri
- کریم بوذرجمهری
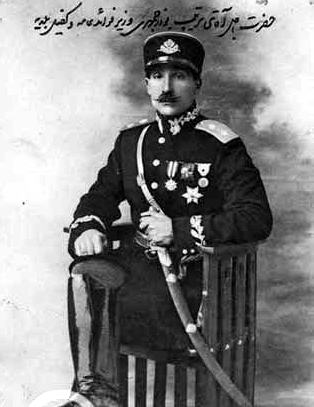
- Karim Buzarjomehri (between 1923 and 1933)

Commander of the Imperial Iranian Air Force (acting)
- In office 31 August 1941 – 22 November 1941
- Monarchs: Reza Shah; Mohammad Reza Pahlavi
- Prime Minister: Mohammad Ali Foroughi
- Preceded by: Ahmad Mirza-Khosravani
- Succeeded by: Abdul-Majid Firouz

Mayor of Tehran
- In office October/November 1923 – 15 January 1934
- Monarchs: Ahmad Shah Qajar; Reza Shah
- Prime Minister: Reza Khan; Mohammad Ali Foroughi; Mostowfi ol-Mamalek; Mehdi Qoli Hedayat; Mohammad Ali Foroughi
- Preceded by: Kasbar Ipegian
- Succeeded by: Gholi Hooshmand

Minister of Public Works
- In office 7 September 1929 – March/April 1930
- Monarch: Reza Shah
- Prime Minister: Mehdi Qoli Hedayat
- Preceded by: Mahmoud Djam
- Succeeded by: ?

Personal details
- Born: 1886 Natanz, Qajar Iran
- Died: 1952 (aged 65–66) Tehran, Pahlavi Iran
- Awards: Order of Zolfaghar

Military service
- Allegiance: Qajar Iran (1899–1925); Pahlavi Iran (1925–1941)
- Branch/service: Persian Cossack Brigade (1899–1921); Imperial Iranian Ground Forces (1921–1941)
- Years of service: 1899–1941
- Rank: Major General
- Commands: First Division of Tehran (1933–1941); Army Freight and Transport Department; Central Infantry Brigade; Bahadur Infantry Regiment
- Battles/wars: Persian Constitutional Revolution; 1921 Persian coup d'état; Luri tribal insurgency in Pahlavi Iran; World War II; Anglo-Soviet invasion of Iran

Karim Agha Khan Bouzarjomehri (Persian: کریم آقا خان بوذرجمهری; 1886–1952) was a leading Iranian military general and supporter of Reza Pahlavi.

Buzarjomehri started military training at 13, and later became one of Reza Shah's most trusted figures.

He was exiled from Tehran along with Reza Shah following the Anglo-Soviet invasion of Iran during World War II, and later carried out his last mission of accompanying the dead body of Reza Shah back to Iran.

== Early life and military career ==
Buzarjomehri was born in Natanz in 1886. Before entering military service, he worked manual jobs as a brickmaker and mortar carrier in Natanz and Kashan. During the Persian Constitutional Revolution, he moved to Tehran and enlisted as a private in the Persian Cossack Brigade through a recommendation by Habibullah Riahi.

He was assigned to the machine gun company commanded by Captain Reza Khan (later Reza Shah). Buzarjomehri earned Reza Khan's trust through his work ethic, eventually becoming his warehouse keeper and personal valet. By the time of the 1921 Persian coup d'état, he held the rank of First Lieutenant. Following the coup, he graduated from the sergeant school and was tasked with arresting political dissidents who opposed the new regime.

== Military advancement ==
Following the 1921 coup, Buzarjomehri was promoted to Captain and appointed head of Qasr Prison. Over the next two years, he rose rapidly through the ranks, reaching the rank of Full Colonel by 1924. He was appointed commander of the Bahadur Infantry Regiment, a core unit of the Central Infantry Brigade in Tehran.

During the military campaigns in Luristan, Reza Khan dispatched Buzarjomehri to rescue Brigadier General Muhammad Shahbakhti, who was encircled by rebel forces at the Tang-e Zahedshir pass. Following the military success of the Bahadur Regiment in western Iran, Buzarjomehri was awarded the Order of Zolfaghar—Iran's highest military honor—on 2 July 1924, alongside Shahbakhti, Colonel Abbas Alborz, and Major Ebrahim Khazaeni.

== Mayor of Tehran (1923–1933) ==
In mid-1923, when Reza Khan became Prime Minister, Buzarjomehri was appointed supervisor of the Tehran Municipality (Baladiyeh), a position he held for a decade. During his tenure, he oversaw the rapid architectural transformation of the capital using European urban planning models:

- Taxation: He restructured municipal finances by introducing new urban taxes while abolishing older levies on automobiles and horse carriages.
- Infrastructure: He spearheaded the widespread asphalt paving of city streets and established Tehran's first modern fire department, municipal hospital, and public asylum.
- Urban Demolition: He ordered the destruction of Tehran's twelve historic defensive gates to facilitate outward urban expansion.
- Urban Planning: He modeled the redesign of Toopkhaneh Square after public squares in Saint Petersburg. He also extended Valiasr Street north toward Tajrish and mandated the planting of its signature sycamore trees.
- Monuments: He constructed Hasanabad Square, featuring its characteristic eight surrounding architectural domes. He also ordered the removal and destruction of the equestrian statue of Naser al-Din Shah Qajar—the first modern public statue in Iran—to melt it down for manufacturing ammunition.

Following his retirement from the municipality, a major commercial boulevard passing the Tehran Grand Bazaar was named Buzarjomehri Street in his honor (later renamed 15 Khordad Street).

== Other official roles and controversies ==
Alongside his municipal duties, Buzarjomehri directed the Army Freight and Transport Department and maintained command of the Central Infantry Brigade.

In September 1929, he joined the cabinet of Prime Minister Mehdi Qoli Hedayat as the Minister of Public Works. In this role, he enforced mandatory uniforms and strict bureaucratic hierarchies. He installed a disciplinary cell inside the ministry to imprison or physically punish insubordinate staff. These methods caused widespread employee protests and parliamentary backlash. Consequently, the ministry was permanently dissolved in April 1930 and split into the Ministry of National Economy and the Ministry of Roads and Communications, ending his ministerial term. He concurrently managed the private palaces and personal estates of the Shah.

== Later life and death ==
In 1933, Buzarjomehri fell severely ill due to overwork. Unable to find effective treatment in Tehran, Reza Shah sent him to Europe for medical care. Upon his recovery and return to Iran, he was promoted to Major General (Sarlashkar) and appointed commander of the First Division of Tehran, the army's largest and most equipped division.

Following the Anglo-Soviet invasion of Iran in September 1941, Buzarjomehri retired from active military service. He later joined the official delegation that successfully repatriated the body of the abdicated Reza Shah back to Iran from exile. In 1950, he served as the Chief of Inspection and Financial Overseer of the Royal Court. Buzarjomehri died in Tehran in 1952.

== References used ==
The following reference was used for the above writing: 'Alí Rizā Awsatí (عليرضا اوسطى), Iran in the Past Three Centuries (Irān dar Se Qarn-e Goz̲ashteh - ايران در سه قرن گذشته), Vols. 1 and 2 (Paktāb Publishing - انتشارات پاکتاب, Tehran, Iran, 2003). ISBN 964-93406-6-1 (Vol. 1), ISBN 964-93406-5-3 (Vol. 2).
