= Imam Khomeini Square =

Square in Tehran, Iran

Coordinates: 35°41′09″N 51°25′17″E

- Toopkhaneh Square
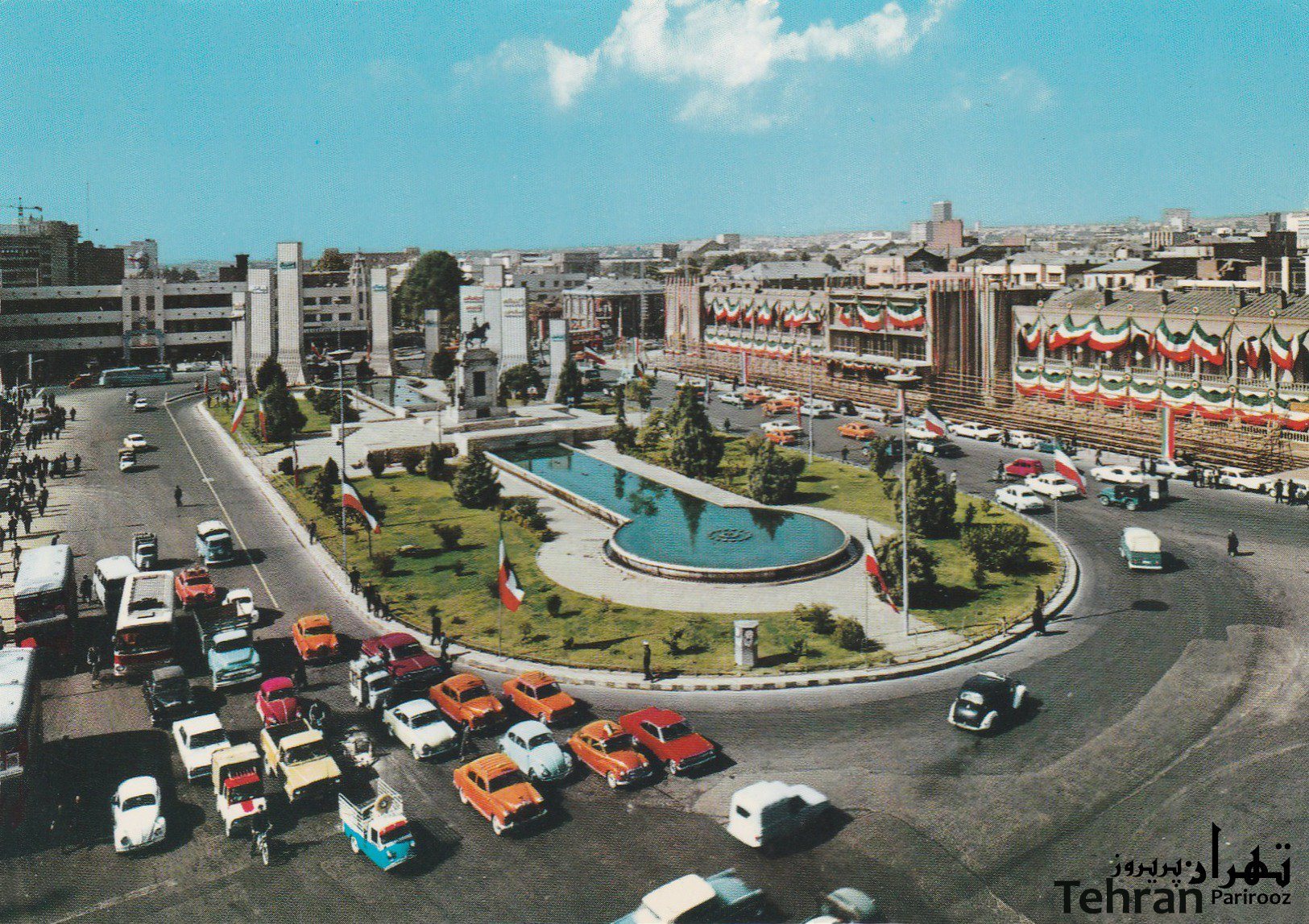
- The Square in 1967
- Interactive map of Imam Khomeini Square
- Former name: Sepah Square
- Location: Tehran, Iran

The Imam Khomeini Square (Persian: میدان امام خمینی) also known as Toopkhaneh Square (میدان توپخانه) is a major town square in Central Tehran, Iran.

== History ==
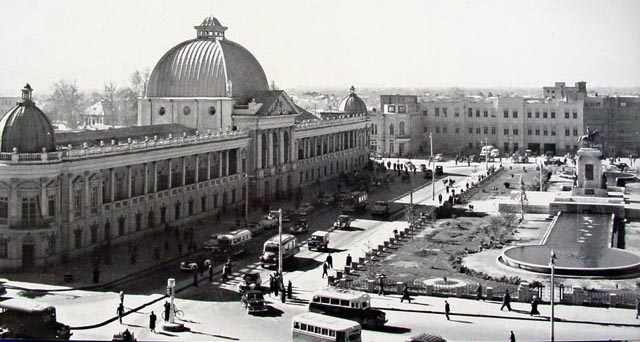
Telegraph building

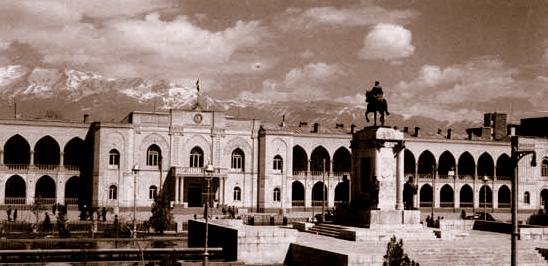
Tehran Municipality Palace in the 1950s

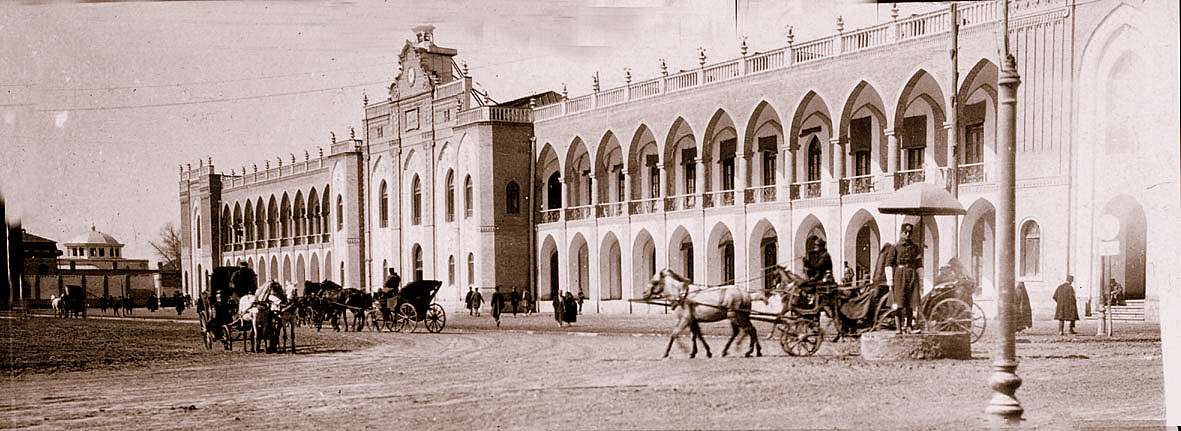
Municipality Palace of Tehran in the 1930s to 1940s

The city square that is known as Imam Khomeini was built in 1867 after the expansion of Tehran during the reign of Naser al-Din Shah Qajar, on the north of the former site of Dowlat Gate. First, it was called ToopKhāneh (Persian: توپخانه; which literally means "Artillery Barracks"), because of the many cannons (In Persian, توپ, pronounced Toop) and soldiers there, protecting the main residence of the Qajar Shah (see Golestan Palace).

After the 1921 coup, it was renamed Sepah Square, after the building that Reza Khan worked as War Minister on one corner of the area. After the fall of the Qajars and emergence of the Pahlavis, the name remained Sepah Sq, this time with a huge statue of Reza Shah in the center. During the 1979 Iranian Revolution, the statue was brought down by the revolutionaries. The square took its current name, Imam Khomeini Square (میدان امام خمینی), after the first leader of the revolution, like many other city squares in the Islamic Republic of Iran.

== Layout ==
The square has a distinctive rectangular shape, with six streets ending at its four corners. Those streets are: Amir Kabir (formerly Cheragh Gaz and Cheragh Bargh), Naser Khosrow (Naserieh), Bob Homayoun, Imam Khomeini (Sepah), Ferdowsi and Lalé Zar. This layout of a city square can be found in the more recent Republic Square of Yerevan, there with oval buildings facing the plaza.

== Famous sites ==
Buildings like Telegraphkhane, Municipality Palace and the Imperial bank building once surrounded the square. The Telegraphkhane and the Municipality Palace were demolished in 1970 and 1969 respectively. the former was replaced by a huge brutalist building, housing Mokhaberat-e Iran. the latter's site was a flat parking lot for nearly five decades, and as of now (August 2025), a replica of the Municipality Palace is being built there which is going to host art galleries, cafes and a conference hall.

== Gallery ==
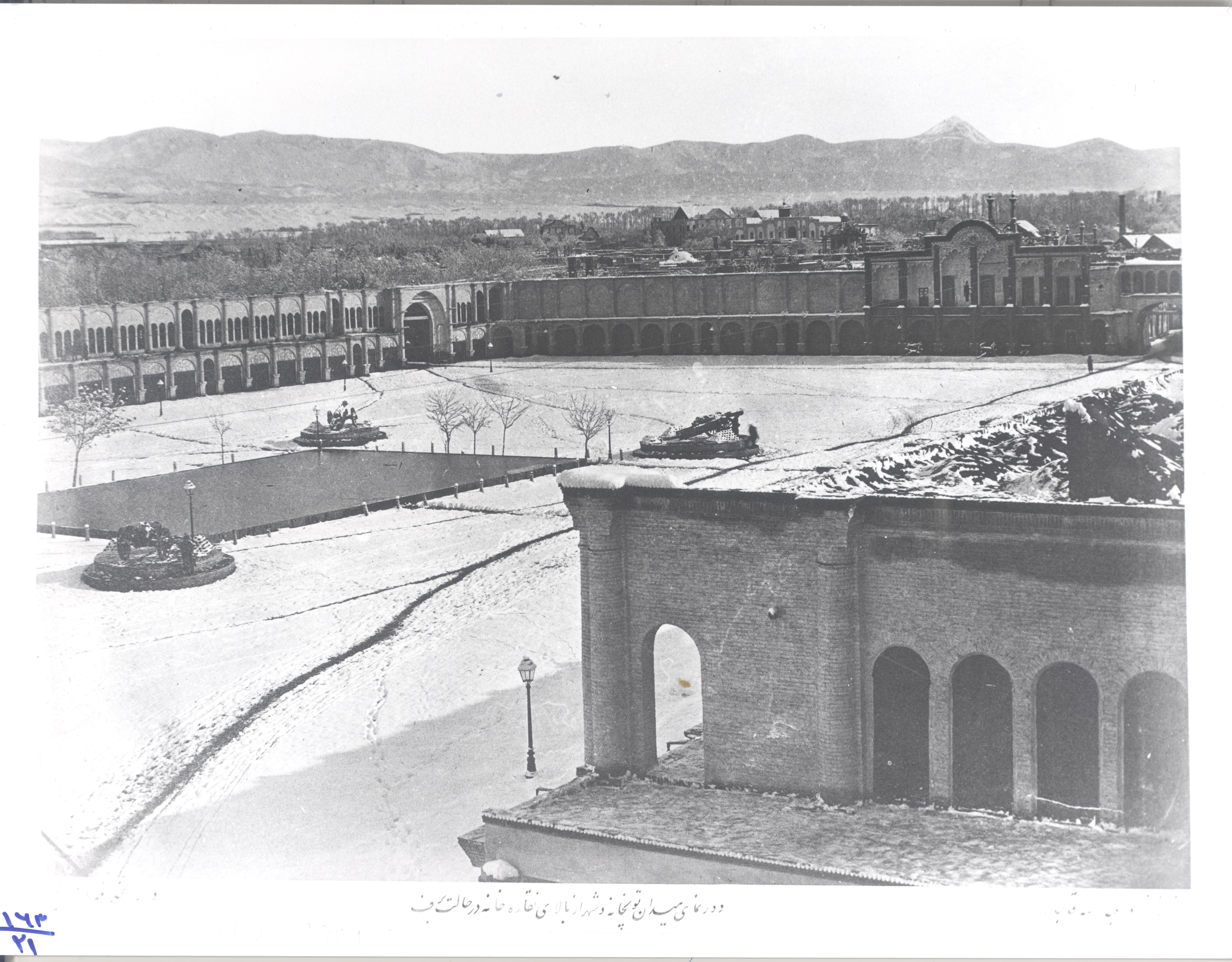
Snow covered Toopkhaneh Square, Qajar era

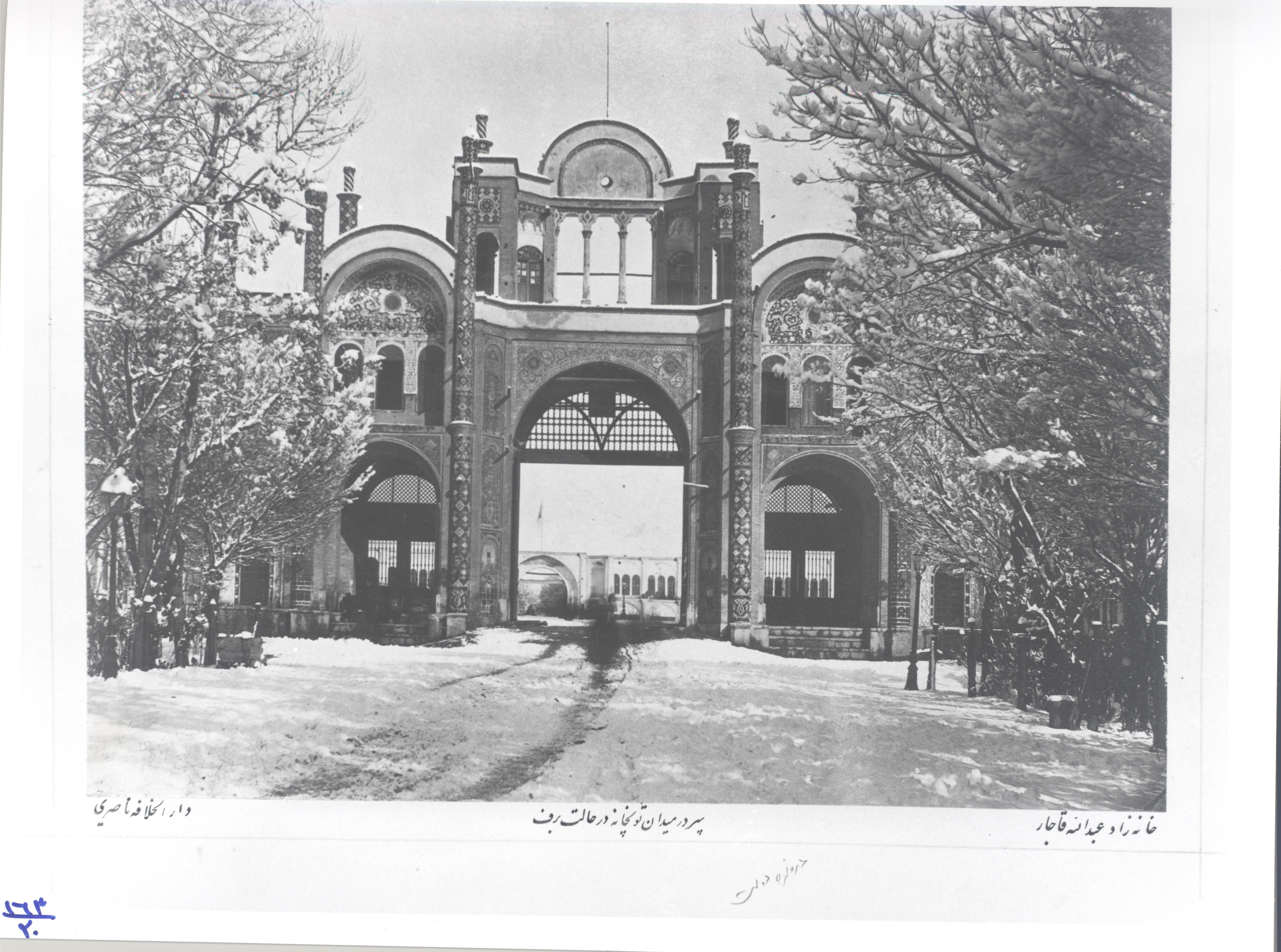
The Dowlat Gate, Qajar era

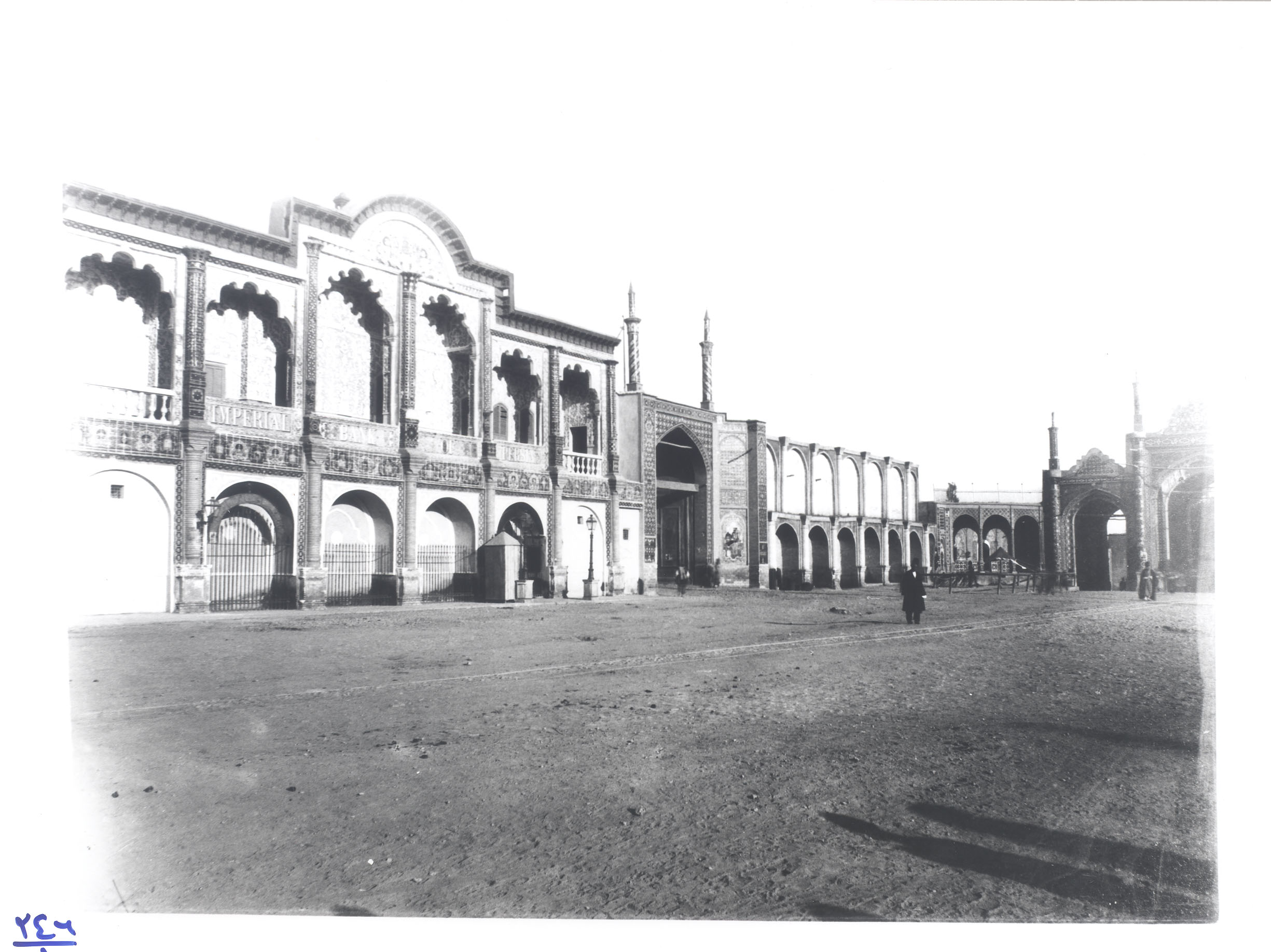
Imperial Bank of Persia, Qajar era

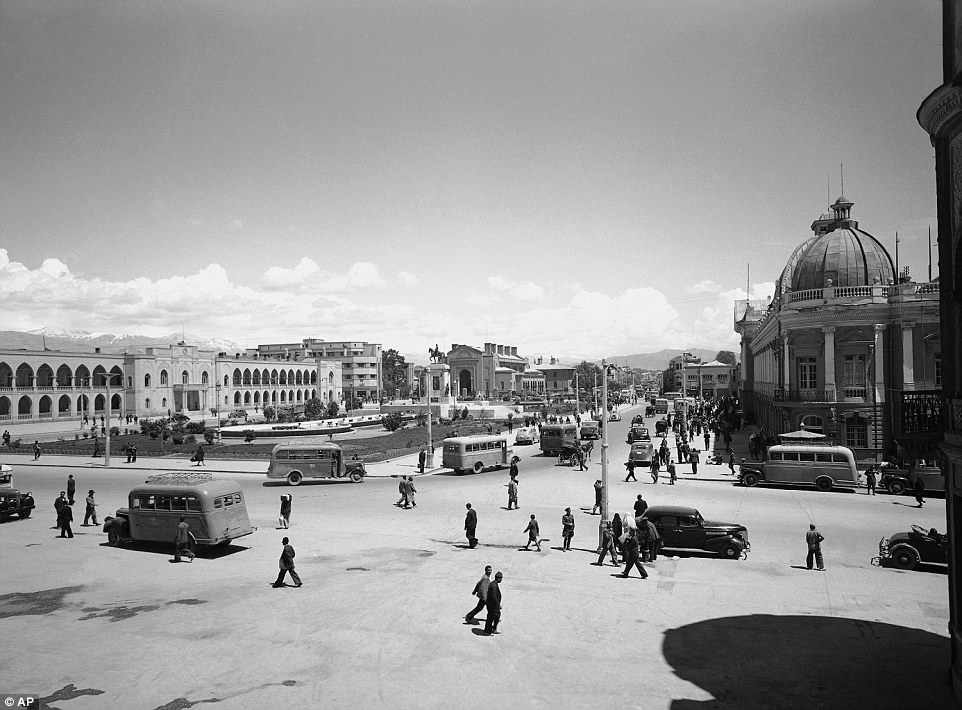
The Square after reconstructions during the reign of Reza Shah, 1946

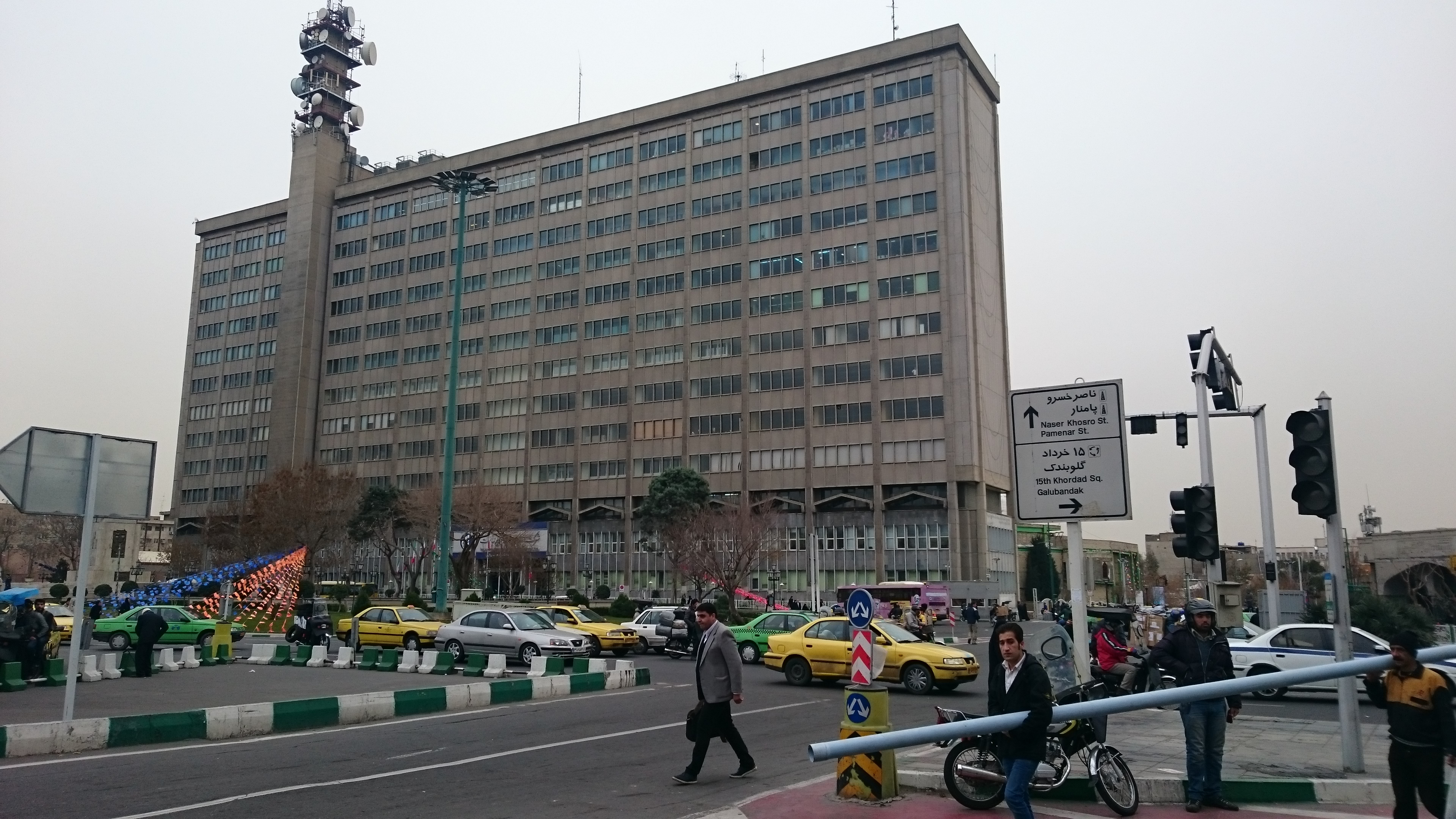
The Square in 2015

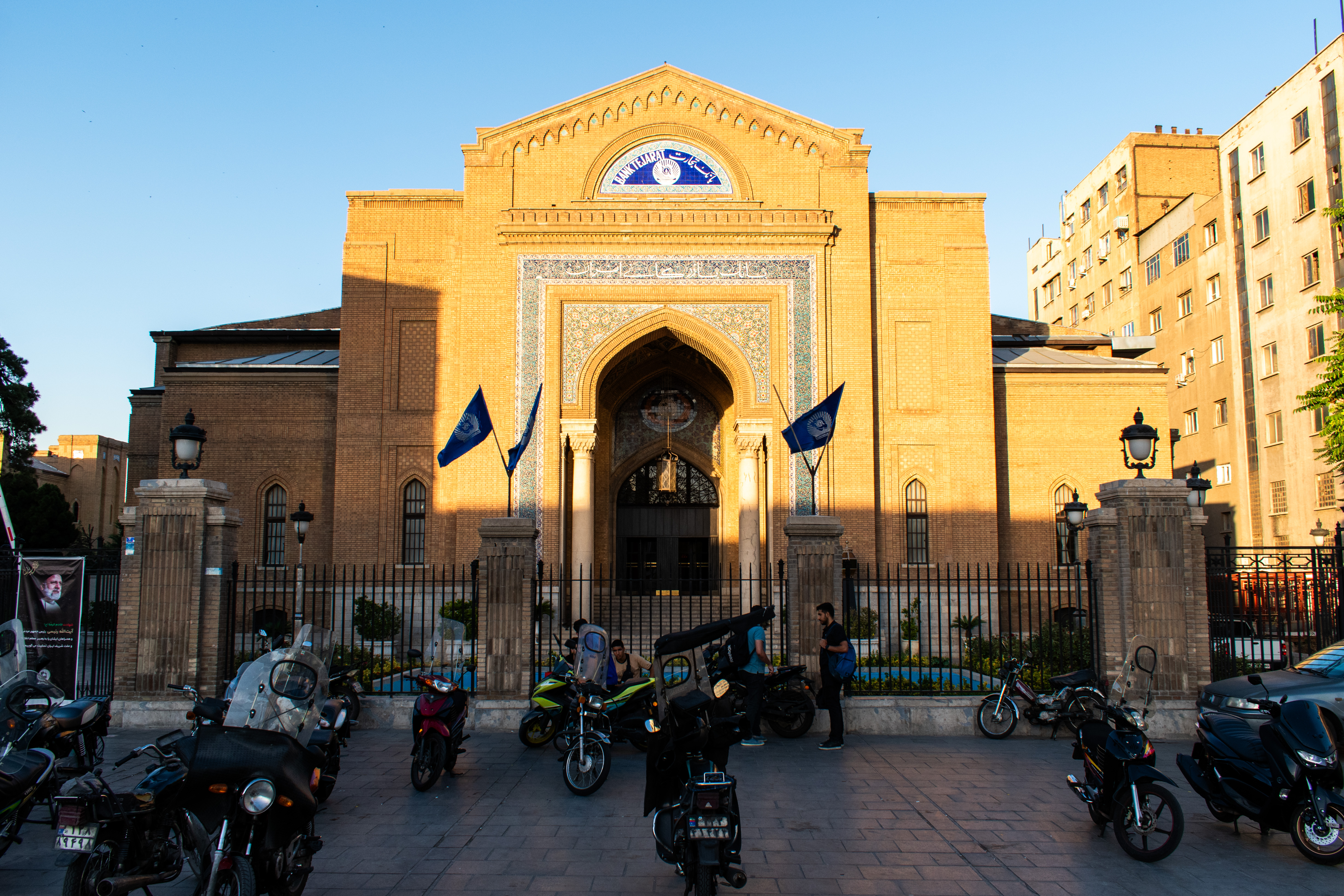
The current Imperial Bank building, 2024

== See also ==
- Imperial Bank building, Tehran
- Khorasan Square
- Rah Ahan Square
- Khavaran
- Gomrok
- Gheytarieh
