= Bank Tejarat =

Iranian banking and financial services company

Tejarat Bank
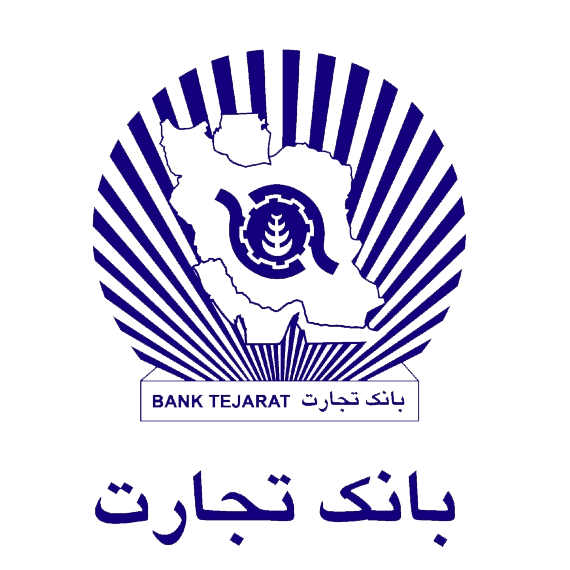

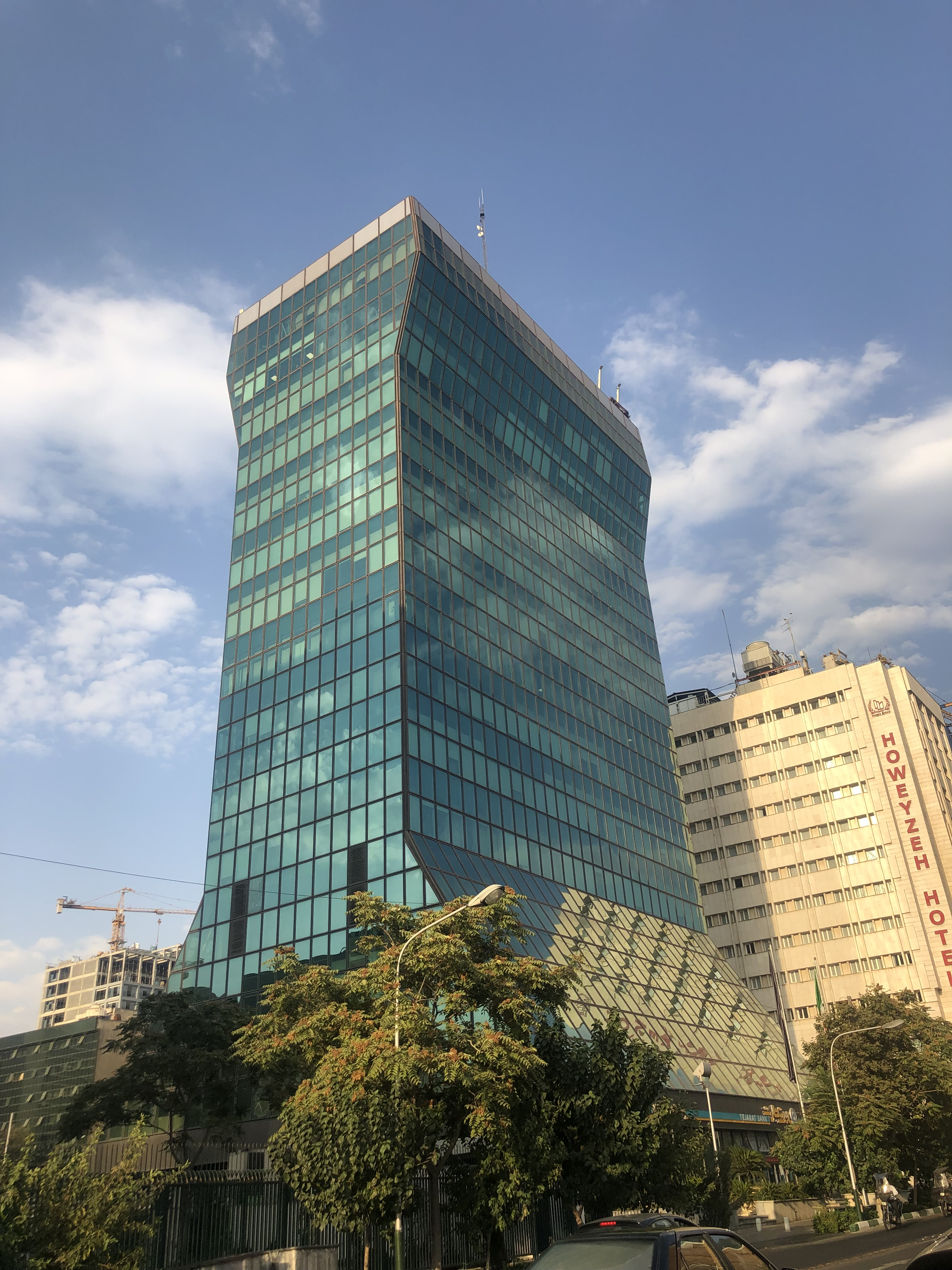
- Company type: Public
- Traded as: TSE: BTEJ1; ISIN: IRO1BTEJ0001
- Industry: Banking; Financial services Insurance
- Predecessor: Iranians Bank
- Founded: 1979; 47 years ago
- Headquarters: Tehran, Iran
- Area served: Middle East; Asia; Europe
- Key people: Morteza Torktabrizi (Chairperson); Hadi Akhlaghi (CEO)
- Products: Consumer banking, corporate banking, finance and insurance, investment banking, mortgage loans, wealth management, credit cards,
- Revenue: 9,381,724 m IRR
- Total assets: 36,331,810 m IRR
- Number of employees: 17,586
- Subsidiaries: Persia International Bank
- Website: https://www.tejaratbank.ir/web_directory/2978-Tejarat-Bank.html

Bank Tejarat (Persian: بانک تجارت, Bānk-e Tejārat, lit. 'Mercantile (or Commerce) Bank') is a significant bank in Iran, headquartered in Tehran. It was formed in 1979 by merger of several institutions including Bank Bazargani, itself the domestic successor of the Imperial Bank of Persia since 1952.

== History ==
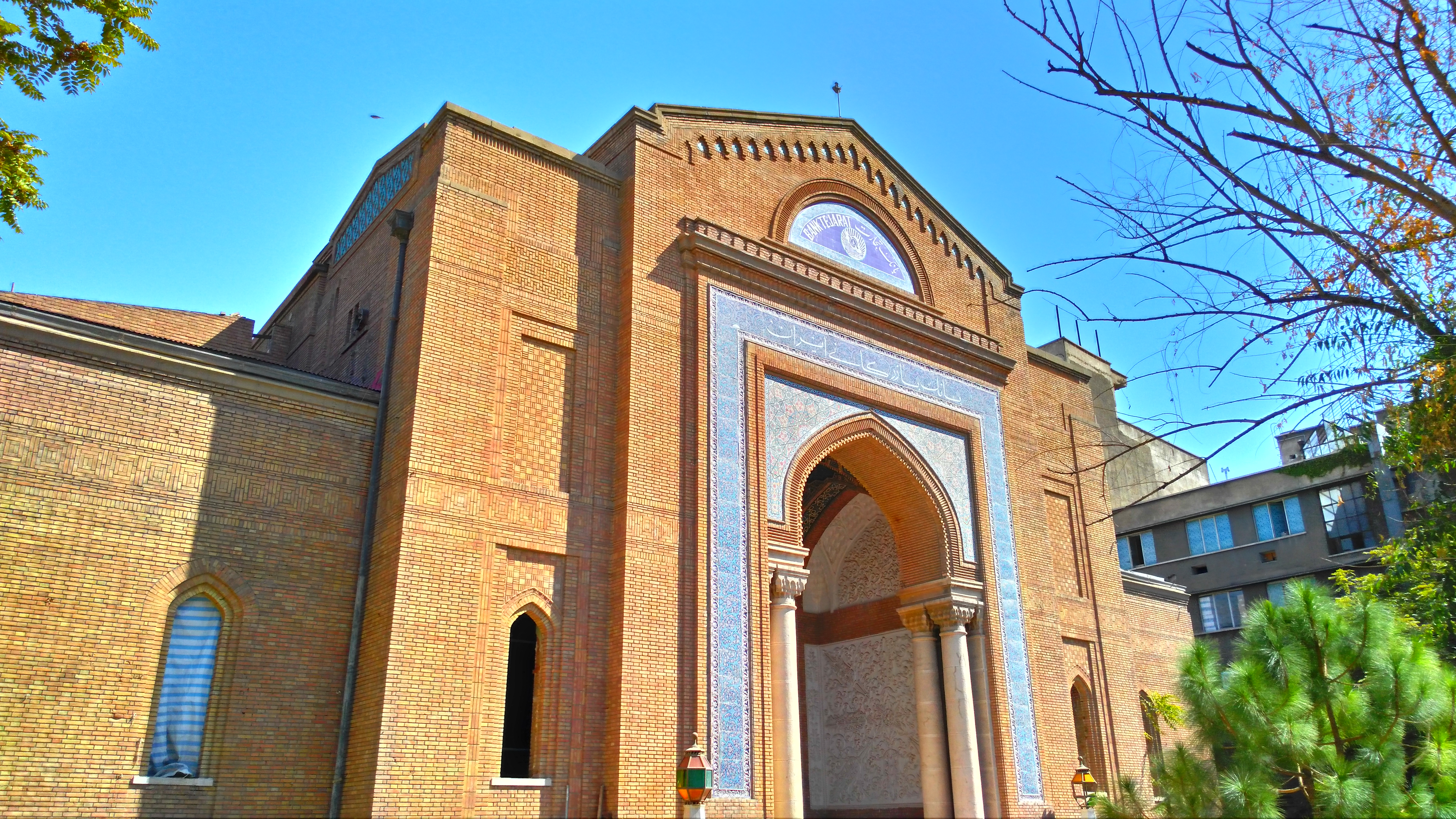
Former Imperial Bank building in Tehran, property of Bank Tejarat

Iran's Banks Nationalization Act was approved in 1979. Bank Tejarat (which means Mercantile or Commerce Bank in Persian) was subsequently established to integrate Bank Bazargani together with five domestic commercial banks and six previous multi-nationality banks which were active in international and domestic fields.

In 2009 the bank was partially privatized, with the Iranian state remaining as a minority shareholder.

In January 2014, the European General Court in Luxembourg ruled to annul the European Union (EU) sanctions in place since 2012 against the bank on grounds of supporting the Iranian nuclear program as there was inadequate evidence supporting the claim. Sanctions remained in place giving time for the EU to appeal the decision, or to re-impose sanctions on different legal grounds. In April 2015 sanctions were re-imposed on new legal grounds. All sanctions were lifted after the Iran's deal with the six world powers on the nuclear program resulted in the embargo being lifted. In 2017, the bank filed a compensation lawsuit at the European Court of Justice, which was dismissed in 2018.

== International branches ==
Tejarat Bank has six branches in other countries.

== Subsidiary companies ==
Tejarat Bank is one of the main shareholders of Kardan Investment Bank alongside Saman Bank and Middle East Bank which was founded in 2014.

== Cooperation with UNICEF ==
For the first time in 2018, Tejarat Bank has signed a memorandum of cooperation with UNICEF to improve the health, nutrition, education, care and overall well-being of children in Iran. and extended this cooperation again in August 2023.

== World Digital Trade Organization membership ==
Tejarat Bank became the first Iranian bank to become an official member of the World Digital Trade Organization, with the aim of playing a role in facilitating monetary and banking transactions for merchants and economic activists.

== See also ==
- Banking and insurance in Iran
- List of Iranian companies
- Privatization in Iran
