= Timeline of Tabriz =

History of Azeri city

The following is a timeline of the history of the city of Tabriz, capital of East Azerbaijan Province in Iran.

== Prior to 15th century ==
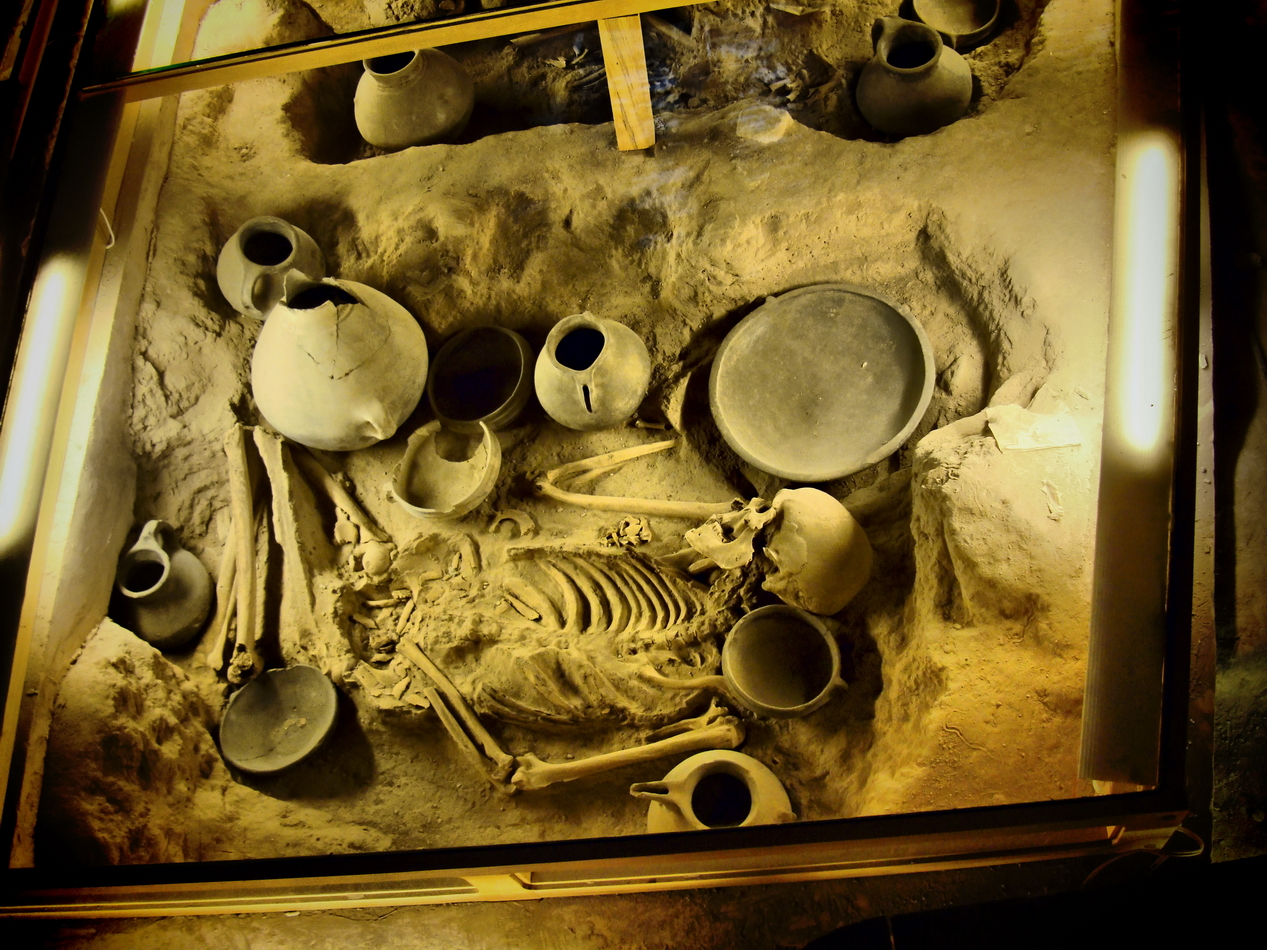
One of the unearthed thumb in Blue mosque excavation site, 1500 B.C.

- 714 BCE. – Mentioned in Assyrian King Sargon II's epigraph
- 2nd to 7th C. BCE The earliest elements of the present Tabriz are claimed to be built either at the time of the early Sassanids in the 3rd or 4th century AD, or later in the 7th century. The Middle Persian name of the city was T'awrēš (similar in etymological roots as the name of city of Tafresh, some distance away.)
- 8th C. CE – Tabriz Bazaar construction begins.
- 858 CE – A devastating earthquake happened in Tabriz.
- 1041 – A devastating earthquake happened in Tabriz.
- 1208 – Annexed by the army of Kingdom of Georgia under command of brothers Ivane and Zakaria Mkhargrdzeli.
- 1275 – Marco Polo traveled through Tabriz on his way to China.
- 1298 – Sham-i Ghazan built (approximate date).
- 1299 – City becomes Ilkhanid capital.
- 1300 – Rab'-e Rashidi (academic center) built.
- 1305 – Ghazaniyya (tomb) built.
- 1311 – Masjid-i Alishah built (approximate date).
- 1314 – Madrasa of Sayyid Hamza built.
- 1320 – Arg of Tabriz built.
- 1330 – Dimishqiyya built (approximate date).
- 1340 – Masjid-i Ustad-Shagird and Alaiyya built.
- 1358 – 1386 Tabriz, capital of the Jalayirid Sultanate
- 1359 – City is briefly occupied by the Muzafarrids
- 1370 – Imarat-i Shaikh Uvais built (approximate date).
- 1385 – Tokhtamysh, Khan of the Golden Horde sacks Tabriz 1385.
- 1386 – Timur captures Tabriz from Sultan Ahmad Jalayir. Timur's son Miran Shah rules Tabriz from 1392 to 1400. His son Mirza Umar follows (1383–1407).

== 15th–16th centuries ==
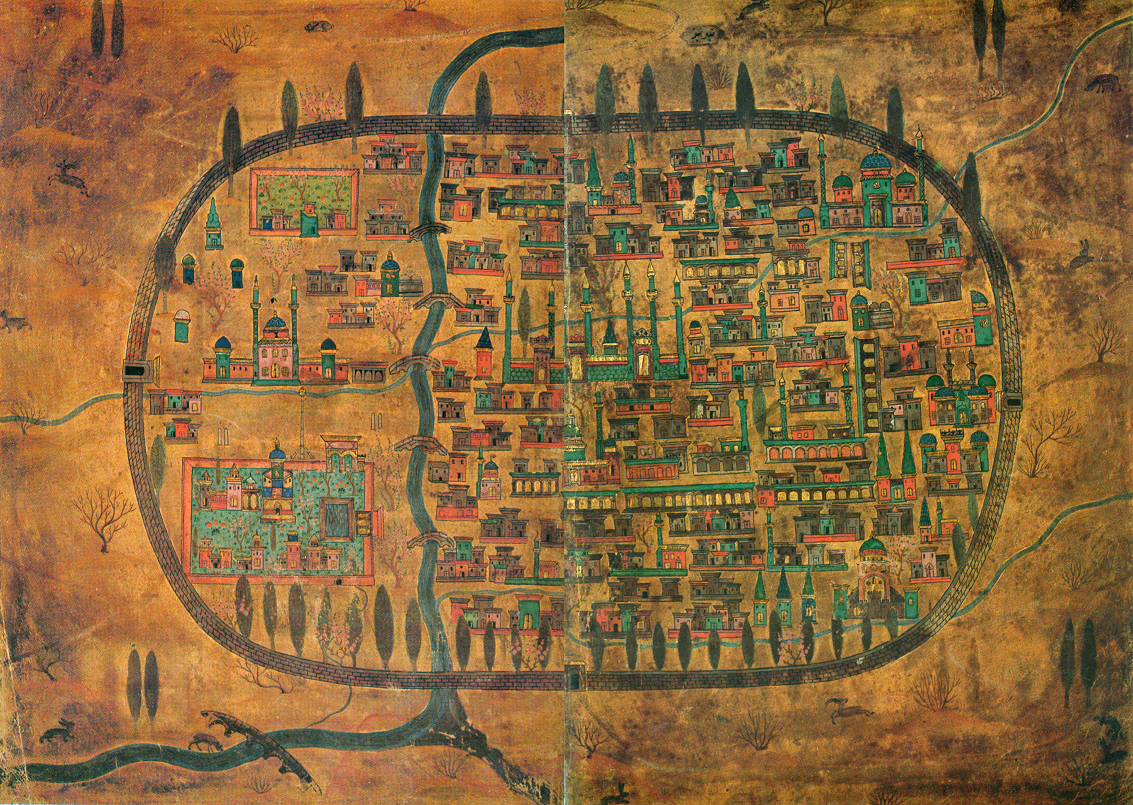
A 16th-century map of Tabriz, sketched by Matrakçı Nasuh (Ottoman polymath).

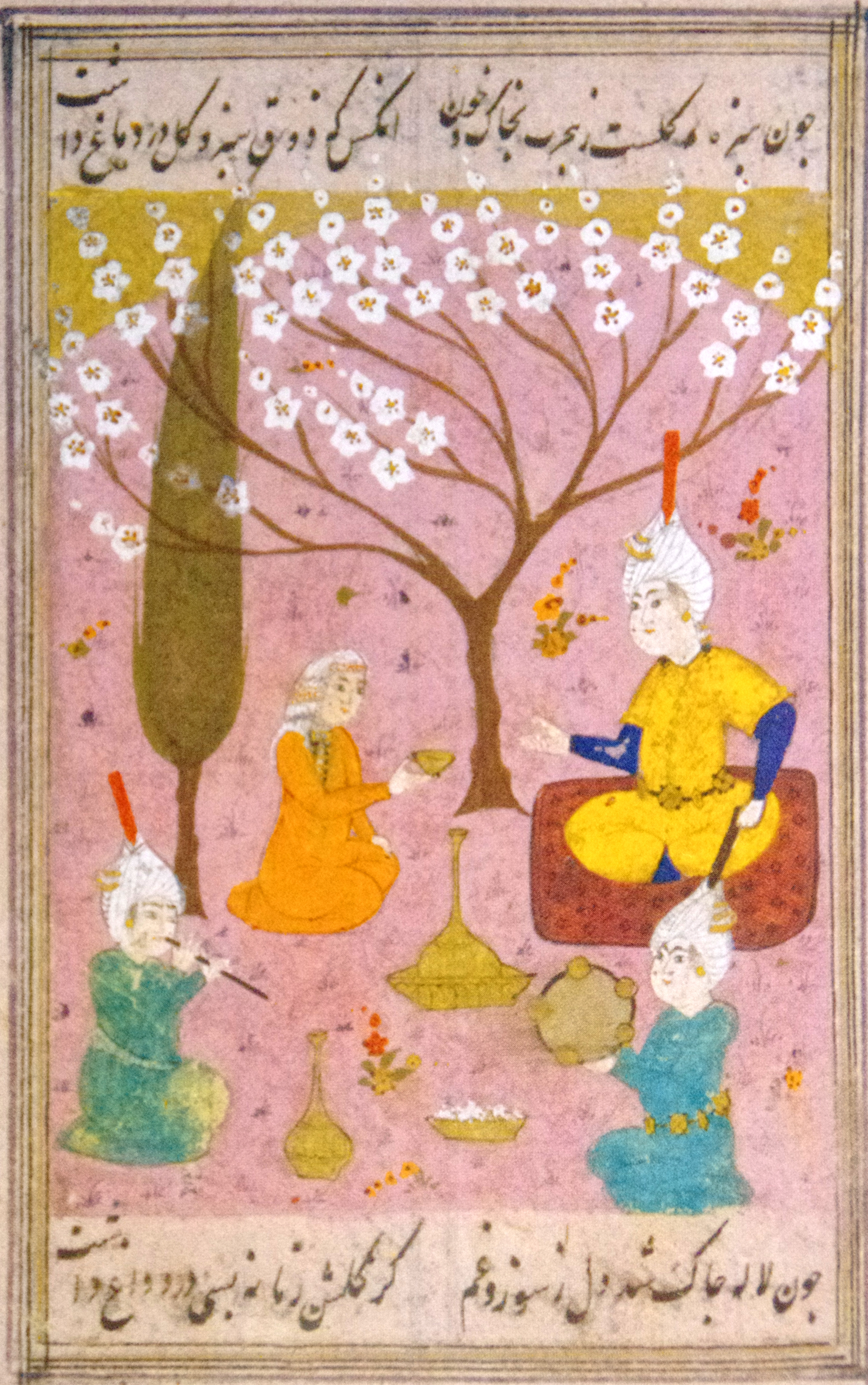
A miniature depicted of 2nd Shah of the Safavid dynasty Tahmasp I in Tabriz.

- 1406-1410 – Sultan Ahmad Jalayir recaptured Tabriz.
- 1406 and 1409 – Qara Yusuf of the Qara Qoyunlu enters Tabriz
- 1410 – Qara Yusuf of the Qara Qoyunlu kills Sultan Ahmad Jalayir and captures Tabriz.
- 1421 – The Timurid Baysunghur briefly occupied Tabriz, and takes artists back with him to Herat
- 1465 – Blue Mosque and Muzaffariyya built.
- 1468 – Uzun Hasan in power.
- 1469 – City becomes part of Ak Koyunlu territory.
- 1472 – Capital relocates to Tabriz from Amid.
- 1475 – Masjid-i Hasan Padshah and Maqsudiyya built (approximate date).
- 1478 – Nasiriyya built.
- 1483 – Hasht Bihisht palace built.
- 1500 – Population: 300,000 (approximate). The fifth most populated city in the world.
- 1501 – Safavid Ismail I in power.
- 1514
  - 5 September: City taken by Ottoman Selim I.
  - Safavids in power.
- 1534 – Ottomans in power.
- 1535 – Safavids in power.
- 1548
  - Ottomans in power, succeeded by Safavids.
  - Capital relocates from Tabriz to Qazvin.
- 1555 – Persians in power per Treaty of Amasya.
- 1571 – Uprising.
- 1585 – Ottomans in power.

== 17th–18th centuries ==
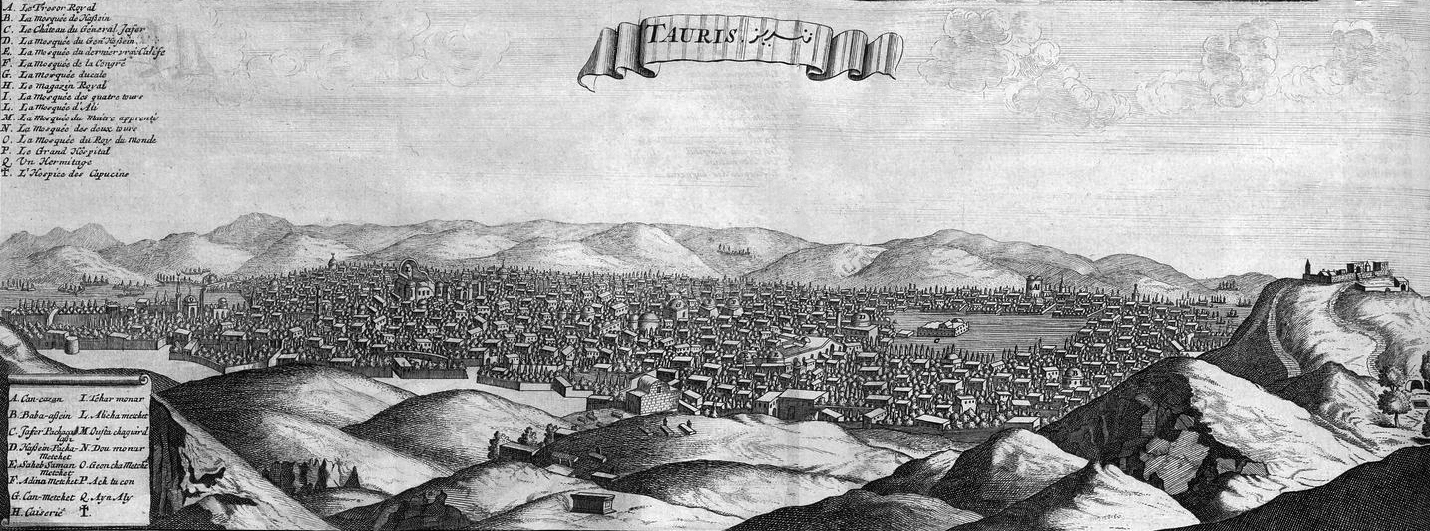
Tauris sketched by Jean Chardin, 1673.

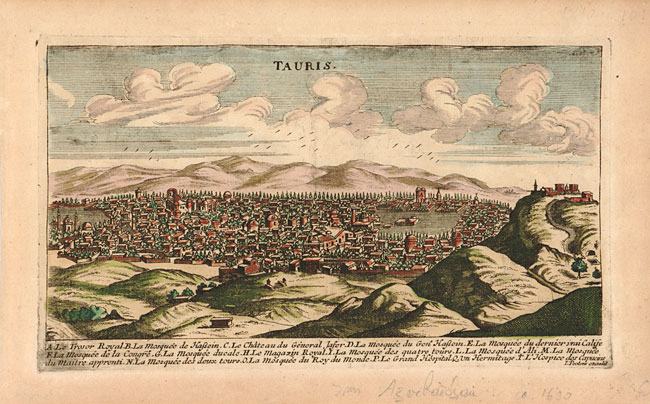
Sketch of Tabriz in 1690.

- 1603 – Safavids in power.
- 1610 – Ottomans in power.
- 1611 – Safavids in power.
- 1635 – City sacked by Ottoman Murad IV.
- 1636 – Saheb-ol-Amr Mosque built.
- 1641 – Earthquake kills thousands and destroys the city.
- 1655 – Madrasa Sadiqiyya built.
- 1673 – Population: 550,000.
- 1676 – Madrasa Talibiyya built.
- 1721 – Earthquake kills eighty thousands.
- 1724 – Ottomans in power.
- 1724/25 Ottoman invaders killed about 200,000 city residents.
- 1730 – Safavids in power.
- 1736 – City becomes part of Afshar territory.
- 1747 – City becomes part of Khanate of Tabriz.
- 1757 – Mohammad Hasan Khan Qajar takes city.
- 1762 – City incorporated into Zand realm.
- 1775 – Earthquake.
- 1780 – 28 February: Earthquake kills about 200,000 city residents.
  - Population: about 30,000.
- 1785 – Qajars in power.
- 1799 – Qajar prince Abbas Mirza appointed as the governor of the city.

== 19th century ==
- 1808 – Population: 250,000 (estimate).
- 1817 – Printing press in operation.
- 1826 – Russians take city.
- 1827 – City becomes part of Russian Empire.
- 1828 – Qajars took power in the city.
- 1830 – Cholera outbreak.
- 1860 – Tehran-Tabriz telegraph begins operating.
- 1868 – Constitution House of Tabriz built.
- 1881
  - Population: 165,000 (estimate).
  - American Memorial School in Tabriz established.

== 20th century ==
=== 1900s–1940s ===
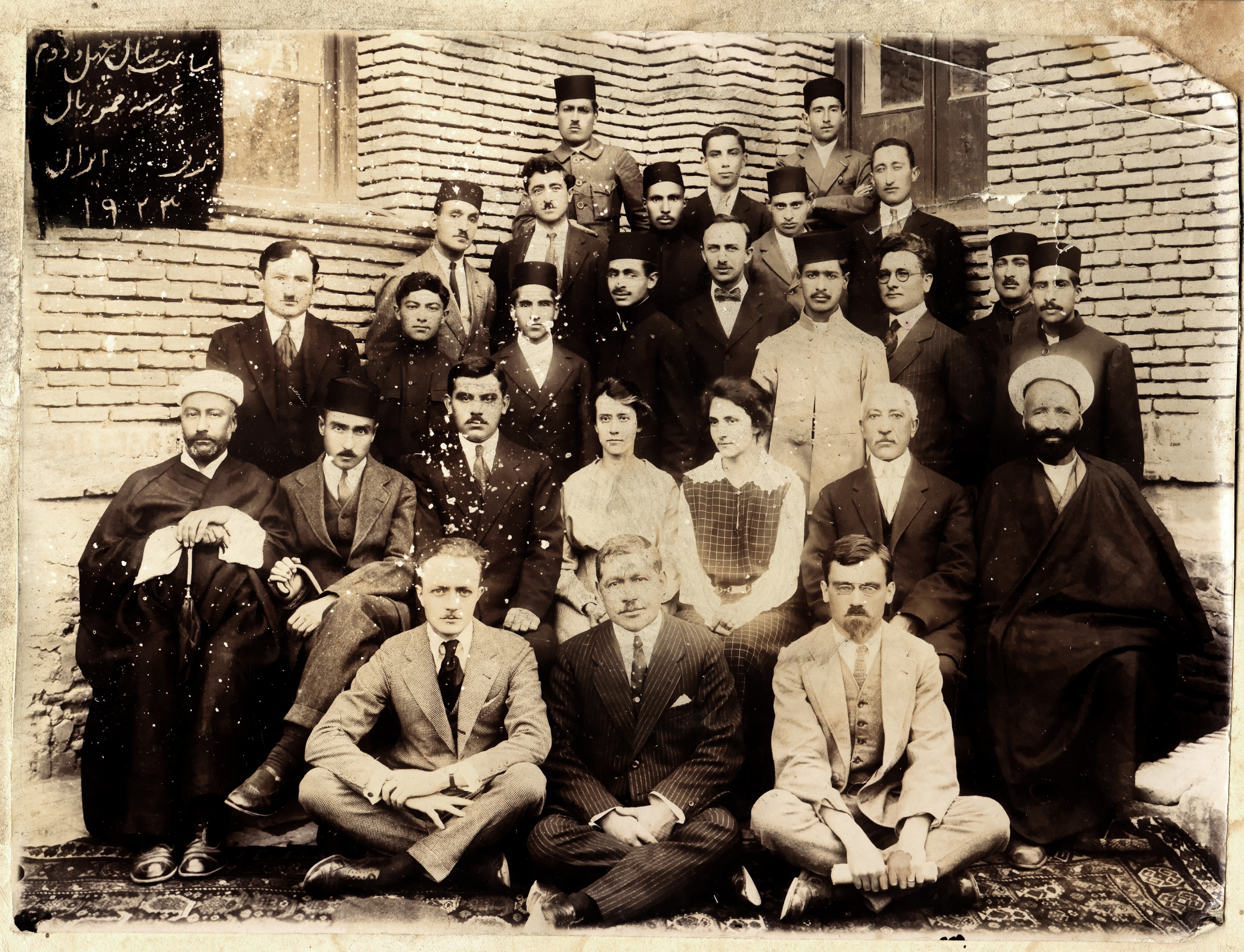
Teachers of Memorial School of Tabriz, photographed in 1923.

- 1908 – Sardar Homayun Vali Qasem appointed as Tabriz first mayor.
- 1909
  - 19 April: Howard Baskerville, the American teacher in Tabriz and a supporter of constitutionals, got killed in battle.
  - 29 April: Russians Cossacks take city.
  - 29 April: Monarchists siege of the city failed with arrival of Russian forces.
- 1910 – Population: 200,000 (approximate).
- 1911:
  - December: Occupation of Tabriz by Russian army in 1911.
  - 30 December: Seqat-ol-Eslam executed with 10 other constitutionals and nationalists by Russian Cossacks.
- 1915 – Tabriz Occupied by Ottoman forces during Invasion of Tabriz, World War I
- 1916 – Jolfa-Tabriz railway begins operating.
- 1917
  - Tabriz Fire Fighting Tower built.
  - Tavakoli matches factory established as one of the first private factories.
- 1918
  - 28 February: Russian retreat from Tabriz completed.
  - 28 February: Ismaeil Nowbari head of local Democrat party took control of the city.
  - 18 June: Tabriz occupied by Ottoman forces.
- 1920
  - 4 September: Iranian Cossacks take control of the city after retreating of Ottoman forces.
  - Late summer: Khiyabani's revolution suppressed with help of Cossacks.
- 1921 – Tarbiat library established.
- 1922
  - 1 February: Major Lahuti's revolt take control of Tabriz.
  - 7 February: Major Lahuti's revolt crashed. Persian Cossacks take control of the city.
- 1925 – City becomes part of Imperial State of Persia.
- 1934 –
  - Tabriz Municipality Palace built.
  - A major flood caused a lot of damages to central parts of the city, including Ali Qapu.
- 1937 – City becomes capital of Eastern Azerbaijan province.
- 1941 – Tabriz occupied by Red Army as part of Anglo-Soviet invasion of Iran.
- 1945 – November – City becomes capital of Azerbaijan People's Government.

University of Azerbaijan established

- 1946
  - Soviet troops retreat from the city.
  - November: Azerbaijan People's Government collapsed by Iranian Imperial Army.
- 1947 - Tabriz University of Medical Sciences established.

=== 1950s–1990s ===
- 1950 – Tabriz International Airport begins operating.
- 1951 – Azarbayijan-i ayandah newspaper begins publication.
- 1956
  - Tabriz National Library founded.
  - Takhti Stadium (Tabriz) opens.
- 1958 – Azerbaijan Museum established.
- 1963 – Population: 387,803 (estimate).
- 1967 – As a beginning point to industrialization of the city Mashin Sazi Tabriz factory is established.
- 1968 – Iran Tractor Manufacturing Company (the biggest industrial complex in northwest of Iran at the time) established in Tabriz.
- 1969 – Machine Sazi Football Club formed.
- 1970 – Tractor Sazi Tabriz Football Club formed.
- 1973 – Reconstruction of Blue Mosque is accomplished.
- 1976 – June: Part of 1976 AFC Asian Cup's final tournament held in Baghe Shomal stadium, Tabriz.
- 1977 – 12 December: students' protest in University of Tabriz in anniversary of establishment of provincial government of Azerbaijan, was brutally attacked by the military units.
- 1978
  - February: As part of Iranian refinery complexes Tabriz oil refinery is established.
  - 18 February: The protest against shah became violent after one of the protesters shot dead. This incidence intensified the rise up of people through the country for revolution of 1979.
- 1979
  - February: City becomes part of Islamic Republic of Iran
  - December: large protest against unfair treatment of Azerbaijani minorities.
  - Varliq, a quarterly publication Azerbaijani magazine established.
- 1980
  - March: Protest in support challenging the new constitution suppressed brutally by central government.
  - September: Air strike on Tabriz Airport and Tabriz Oil Refinery by Iraqi Air force at the first day of Iran–Iraq War.
- 1982 – Population: 852,000 (estimate).
- 1986
  - Azerbaijan Cycling Tour (race) begins.
  - Shahrdari Tabriz Cultural and Athletic Club formed.
- 1989
  - Sahand University of Technology established.
  - Azarbaijan Shahid Madani University established.
  - Tiz'houshan high schools established.
- 1992
  - Tabriz International Exhibition begins.
  - East Azerbaijan Province split into a smaller East Azerbaijan Province, and Ardabil Province.
- 1995 – 21 May: Student protest against unfair treatment of Azerbaijani minority by IRIB.
- 1996
  - Yadegar-e Emam Stadium and Museum of Constitution open.
  - Population: 1,191,043.
- 1997 - Tabriz Islamic Arts University established.
- 1998
  - Hossein Farhangpour becomes mayor.
  - Tabriz Petrochemical Co is established.
- 1999
  - Student protest to support Tehran University's student movement for more political freedom.
  - Tabriz Art University established.
- 2000 – Provincial TV station of Sahand begins broadcasting.

== 21st century ==
- 2001 – Ehtesham Hajipour selected as new mayor of the city.
- 2002 – April: Tabriz Cartoon, an international annual cartoon contest started.
- 2006
  - Alireza Navin selected as new mayor of Tabriz.
  - Amir Nezam House museum and Iron Age Museum open.
  - May – Thousands of ethnic Azeris demonstrated in Tabriz against government official newspaper's (Iran) cartoon insulting Azerbaijani minority.
- 2009 – Gostaresh Foolad Football Club formed.
- 2010 – Bazaar Complex is inscribed as World Heritage Site.
- 2011
  - August: A protest for saving Lake Urmia is suppressed by police.
  - Population: 1,494,998.
- 2012
  - 18 February: Construction of the tallest building in city, Bloor Tower, is accomplished.
  - 11 August: A major earthquake in Varzaqan shocked Tabriz.
  - Air pollution in Tabriz reaches annual mean of 40 PM2.5 and 68 PM10, more than recommended.
- 2013
  - 14 June: Local election held.
  - 15 June: Thousands of city residents came to streets to celebrate the victory of Iranian moderate presidential candidate, Hassan Rowhani.
  - November: Sadegh Najafi-Khazarlou is selected as the 55th mayor of Tabriz.
- 2014
  - 29 March: Tabriz celebrated the earth hour for the first time by turning off Saat Tower's lights.
  - 25 December: Tabriz Soccer Museum is established.
  - City becomes part of newly formed national administrative Region 3.
- 2015
  - 27 August: First portion of Tabriz Metro started its services.
- 2017
  - 4 November: Iraj Shahin-Baher is selected as the 56th mayor of Tabriz.

== See also ==
- Tabriz history
- Timelines of other cities in Iran: Bandar Abbas, Hamadan, Isfahan, Kerman, Mashhad, Qom, Shiraz, Tehran, Yazd

== Bibliography ==
- Jean Chardin (1691), The travels of Sir John Chardin into Persia and the East-Indies, through the Black Sea, and the country of Colchis, London: Christopher Bateman, p. 352+
- Jedidiah Morse; Richard C. Morse (1823), "Tauris", New Universal Gazetteer (4th ed.), New Haven: S. Converse
- William Ouseley (1823), "(Tabriz)", Travels in various countries of the East; more particularly Persia, London: Rodwell and Martin, OCLC 4198311
- Evliya Çelebi (1834). "(Tabriz)". Narrative of Travels in Europe, Asia, and Africa, in the Seventeenth Century. Vol. 2. Translated by Joseph von Hammer-Purgstall. London: Oriental Translation Fund.
- Edward Balfour (1885), "Tabreez", Cyclopaedia of India (3rd ed.), London: B. Quaritch
- "Tabríz" . Encyclopædia Britannica. Vol. 23 (9th ed.). 1888. pp. 18–19.
- Charles Wilson, ed. (1895), "Tabriz", Handbook for Travellers in Asia Minor, Transcaucasia, Persia, etc., London: J. Murray, ISBN 9780524062142, OCLC 8979039
- E.A. Brayley Hodgetts (1896). "(Tabreez)". Round about Armenia: the record of a journey across the Balkans through Turkey, the Caucasus, and Persia in 1895. London: Sampson Low, Marston and Co. hdl:2027/uc2.ark:/13960/t4wh2qf0d.
- A.V. Williams Jackson (1906), "Tabriz", Persia Past and Present: a Book of Travel and Research, New York: Macmillan
- Houtum-Schindler, Albert (1910). "Tabriz" . Encyclopædia Britannica. Vol. 26 (11th ed.). p. 341.
- Charles Melville (1981). "Historical Monuments and Earthquakes in Tabriz". Iran. 19. Taylor & Francis: 159–177. doi:10.2307/4299714. JSTOR 4299714.
- Christoph Werner (2000). "The Amazon, the Sources of the Nile, and Tabriz: Nadir Mirza's Tarikh Va Jughrafi-yi Dar Al-saltana-yi Tabriz and the Local Historiography of Tabriz and Azerbaijan". Iranian Studies. 33 (1–2): 165–184. doi:10.1080/00210860008701980. S2CID 161280655.
- Christoph Werner (2000). An Iranian Town in Transition: A Social and Economic History of the Elites of Tabriz, 1747–1848. Wiesbaden: Otto Harrassowitz Verlag.
- C. Edmund Bosworth, ed. (2007). "Tabriz". Historic Cities of the Islamic World. Leiden: Koninklijke Brill. ISBN 978-9004153882.
- Michael R.T. Dumper; Bruce E. Stanley, eds. (2008), "Tabriz", Cities of the Middle East and North Africa, Santa Barbara, USA: ABC-CLIO
- "Tabriz". Grove Encyclopedia of Islamic Art & Architecture. Oxford University Press. 2009. ISBN 9780195309911.
- Aḥmad Monzawī; ʿAlī Naqī Monzawī (2012). "Bibliographies and Catalogues in Iran: Tabriz". Encyclopædia Iranica.
- James D. Clark (2014). "Tabriz: the city in the 19th century". Encyclopædia Iranica.

== Images ==
=== Tabriz in 19th century ===
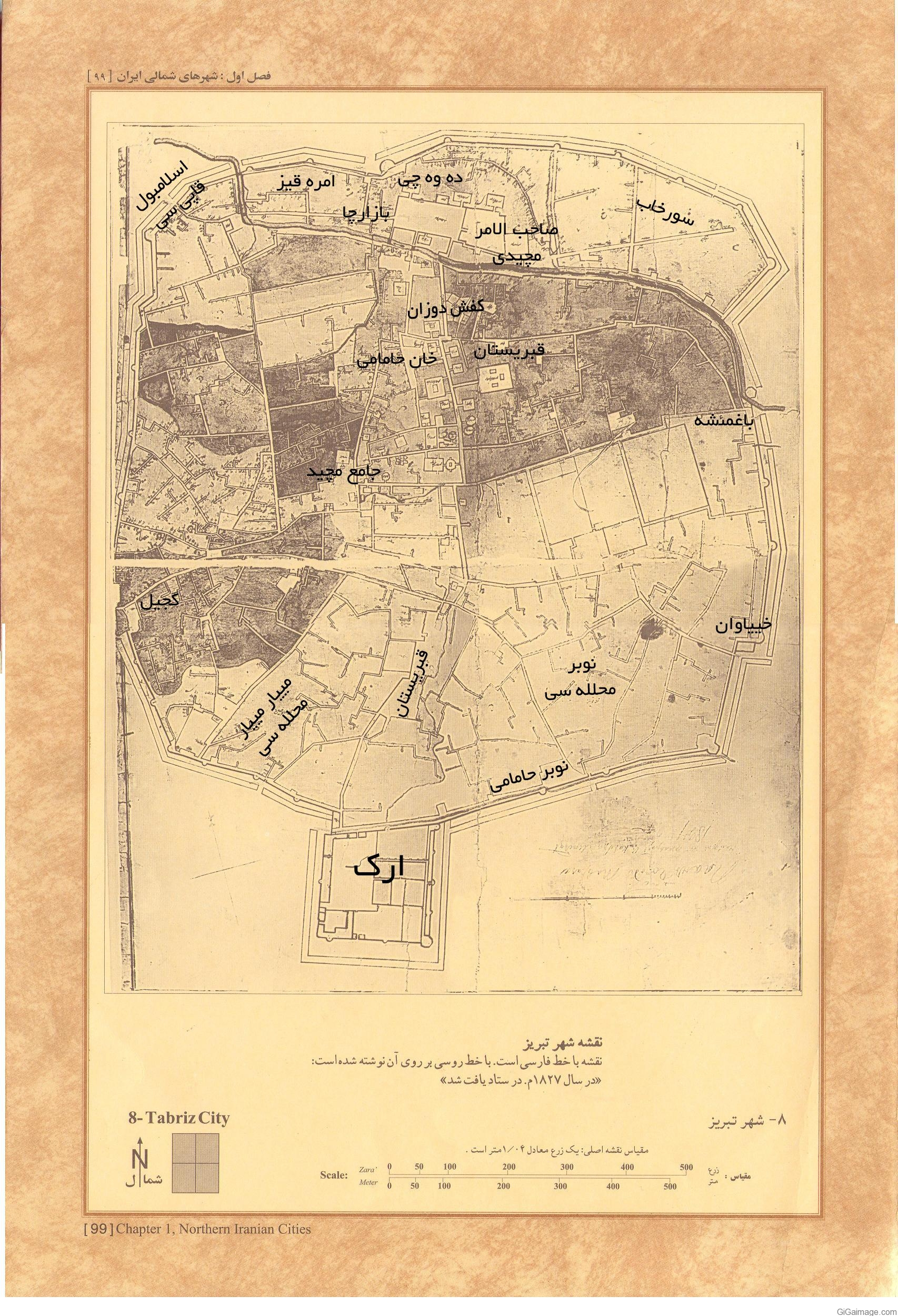
Tabriz map drawn in 1827.

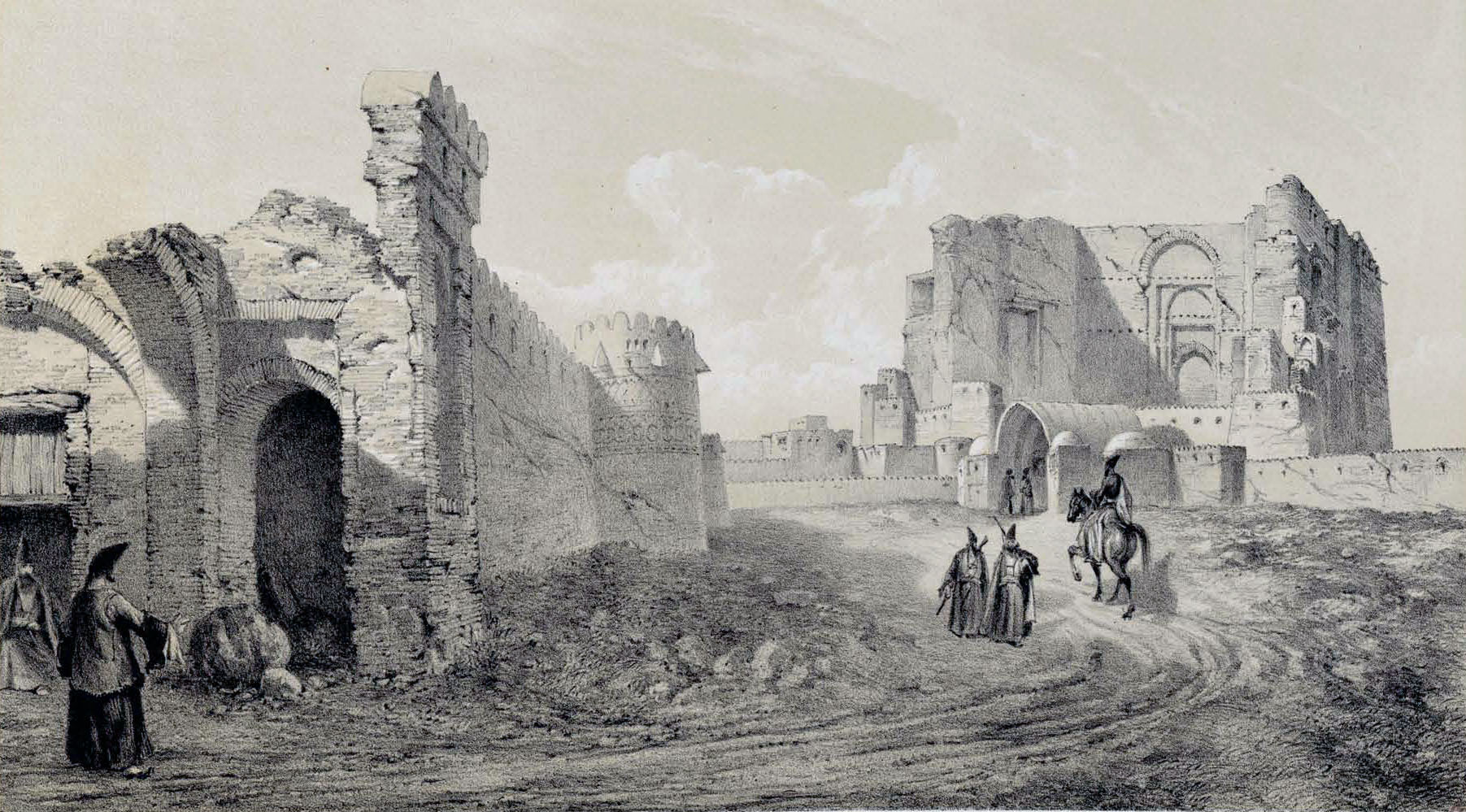
Ruins of Ark castle, Eugène Flandin 1841.

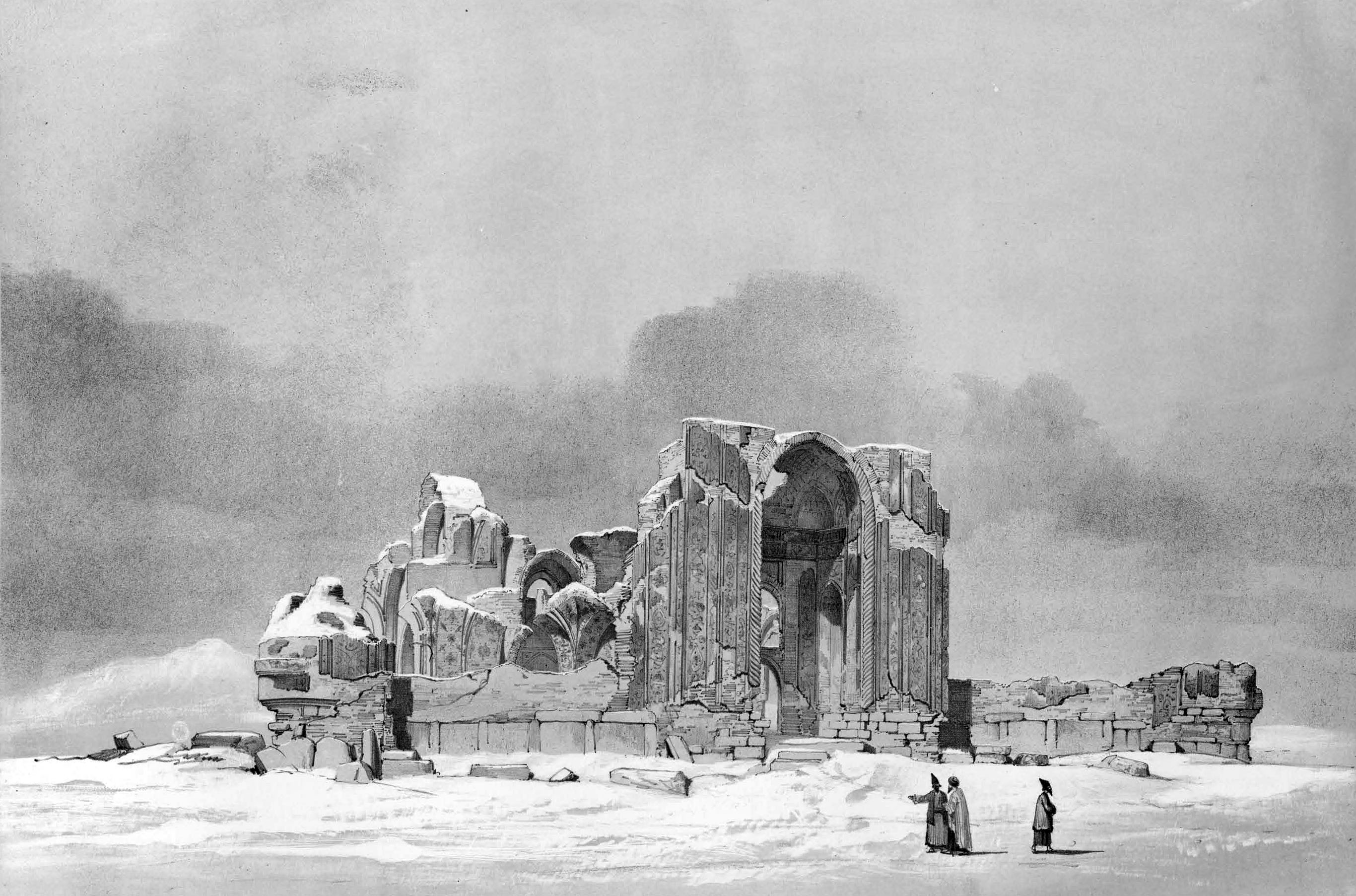
Ruins of Blue Mosque, Eugène Flandin 1841.

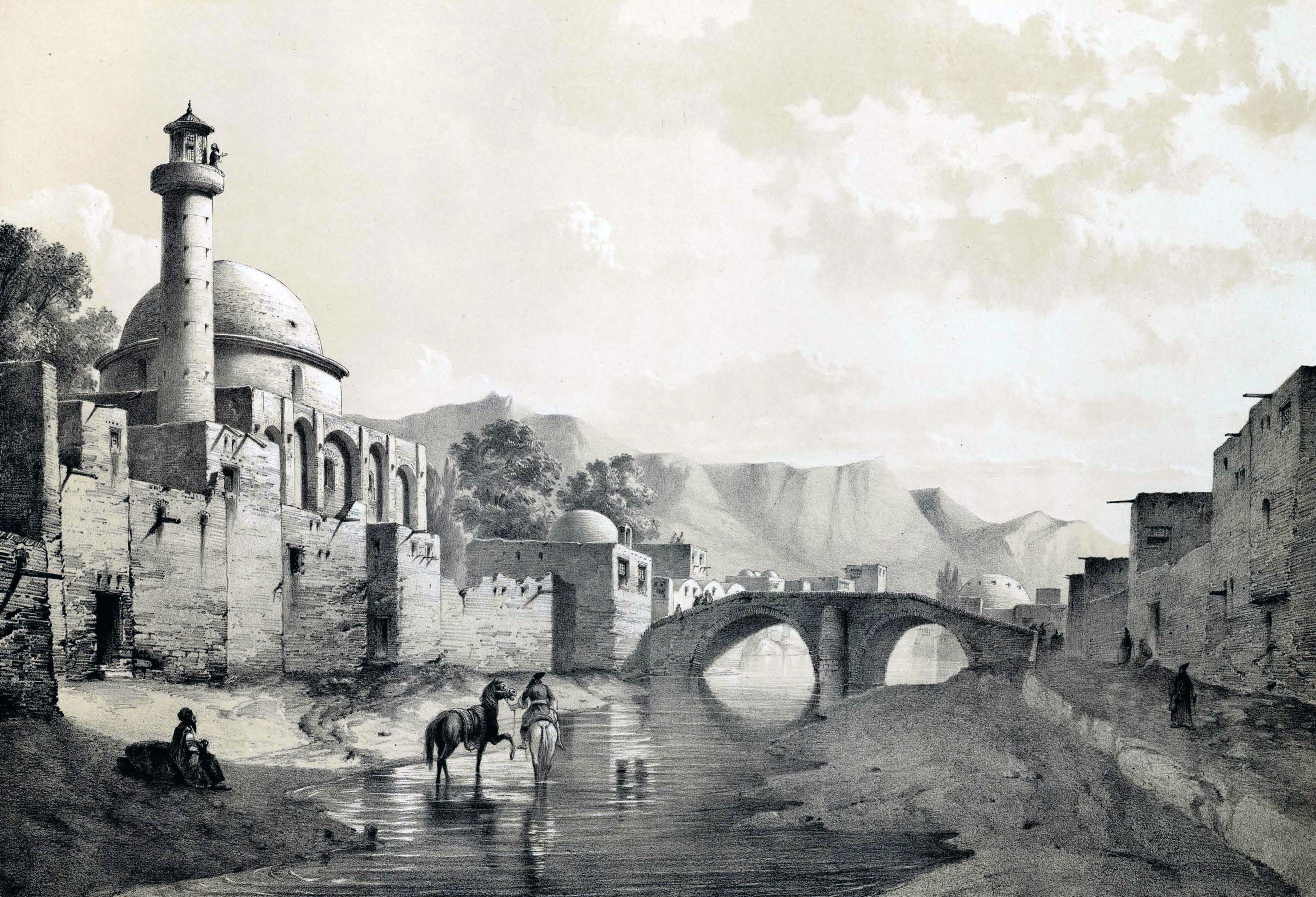
Saheb-ol-Amr Mosque and Quru river, Eugène Flandin 1841

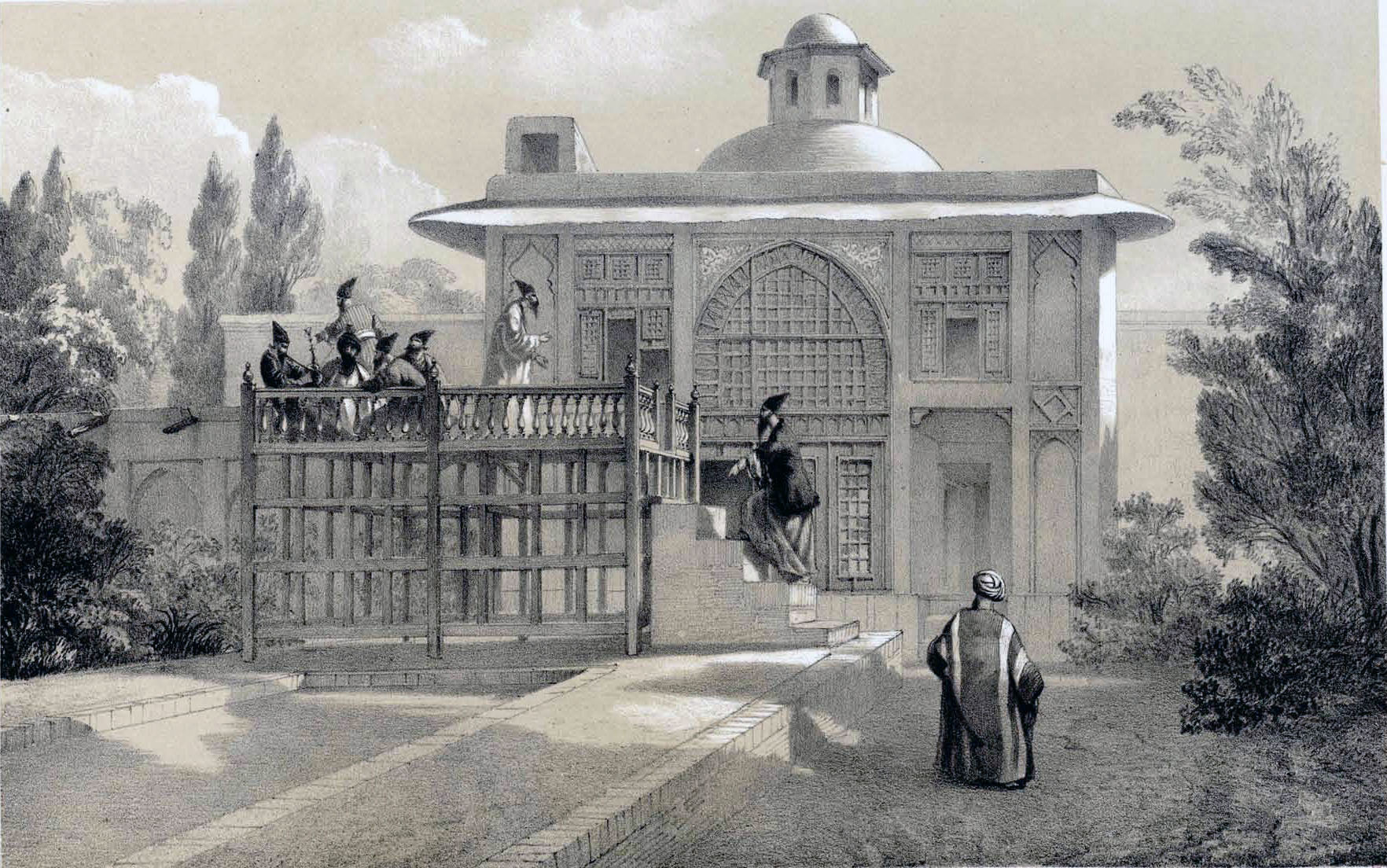
A house in Tabriz, Eugène Flandin 1841.

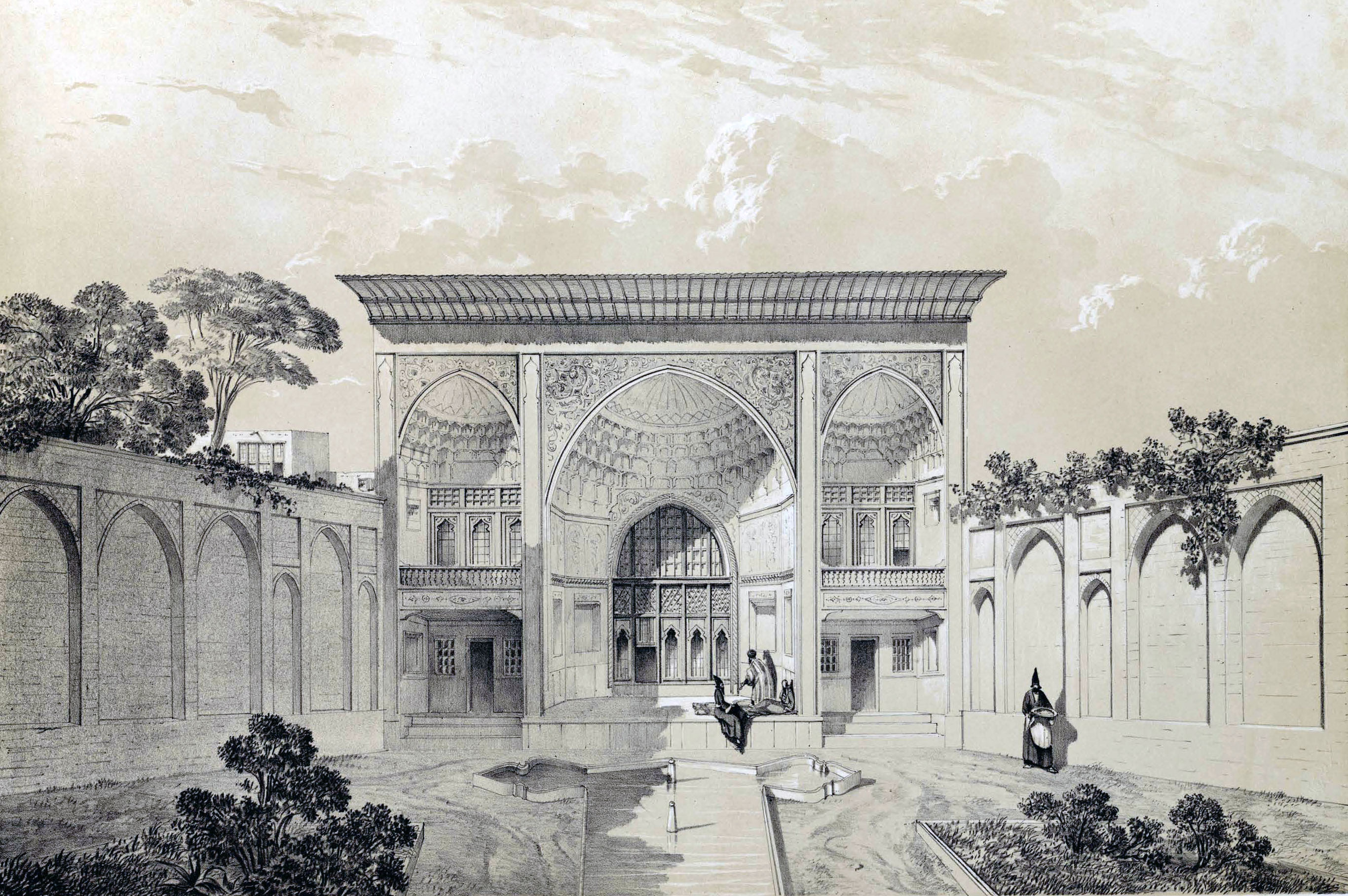
A house in Tabriz, Eugène Flandin 1841.

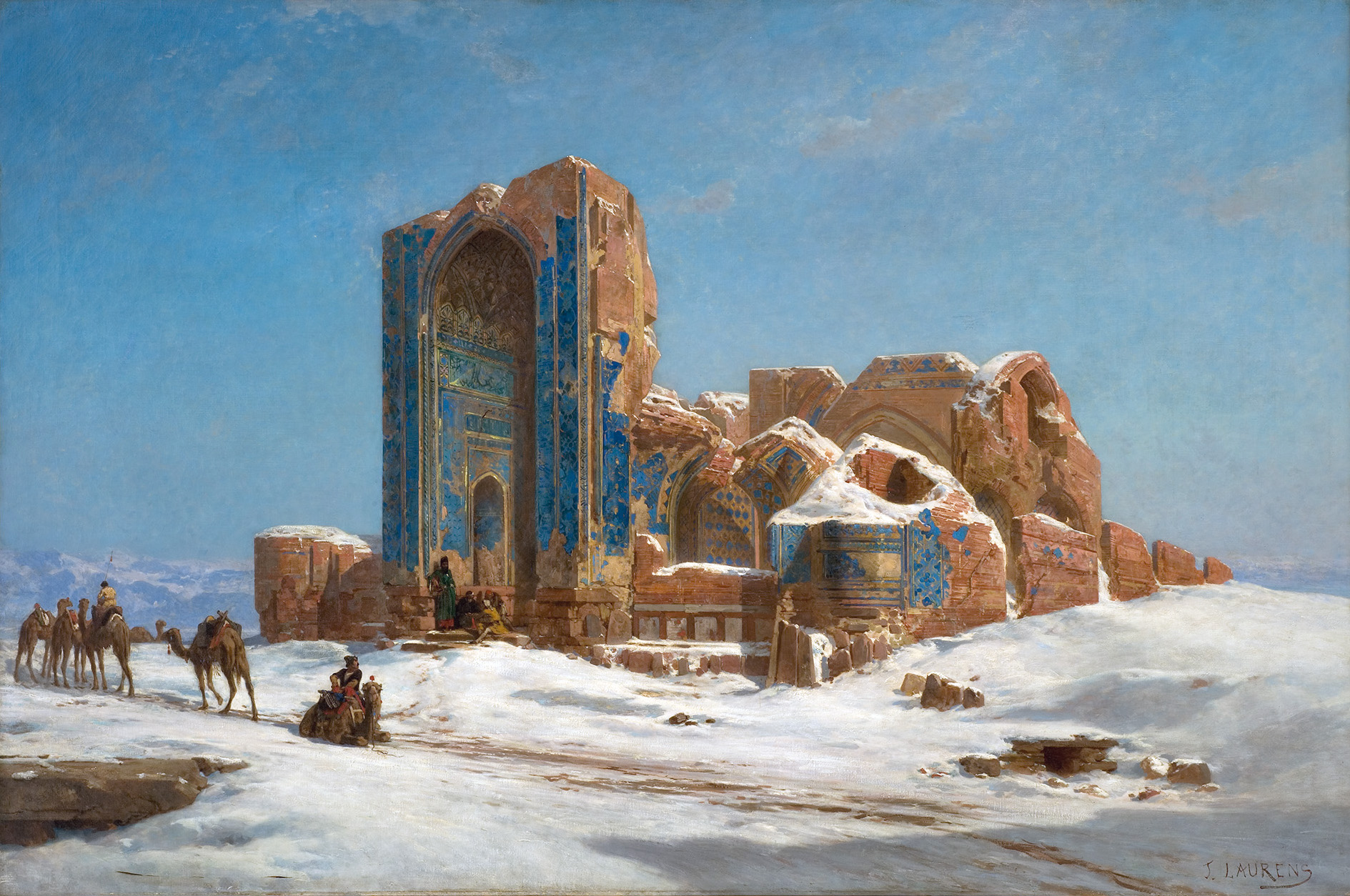
Ruins of Blue Mosque, a painting of Jules Laurens, 1872.

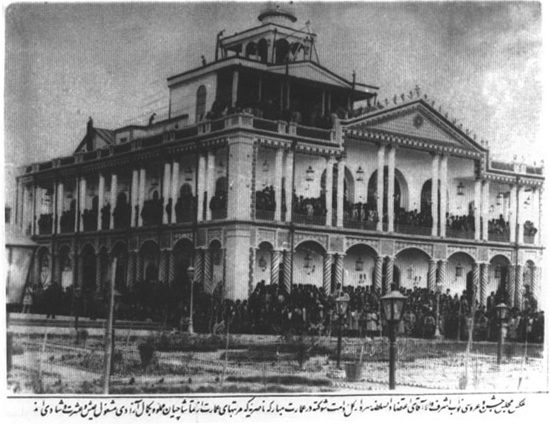
Wedding ceremony of Etezad-ol-Saltaneh in Aali Qapu, 19th century.

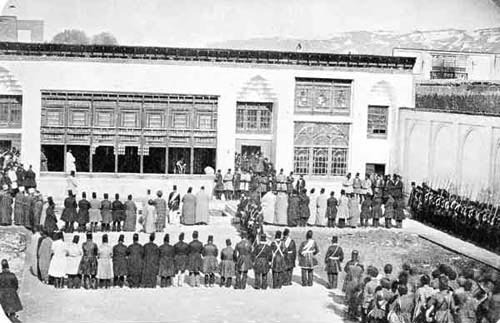
Hail ceremony to the King Mozaffar ad-Din Shah Qajar, during his residence in Tabriz as Crown Prince, Aali Qapu, late 1800s.

=== Tabriz during constitutional revolution ===
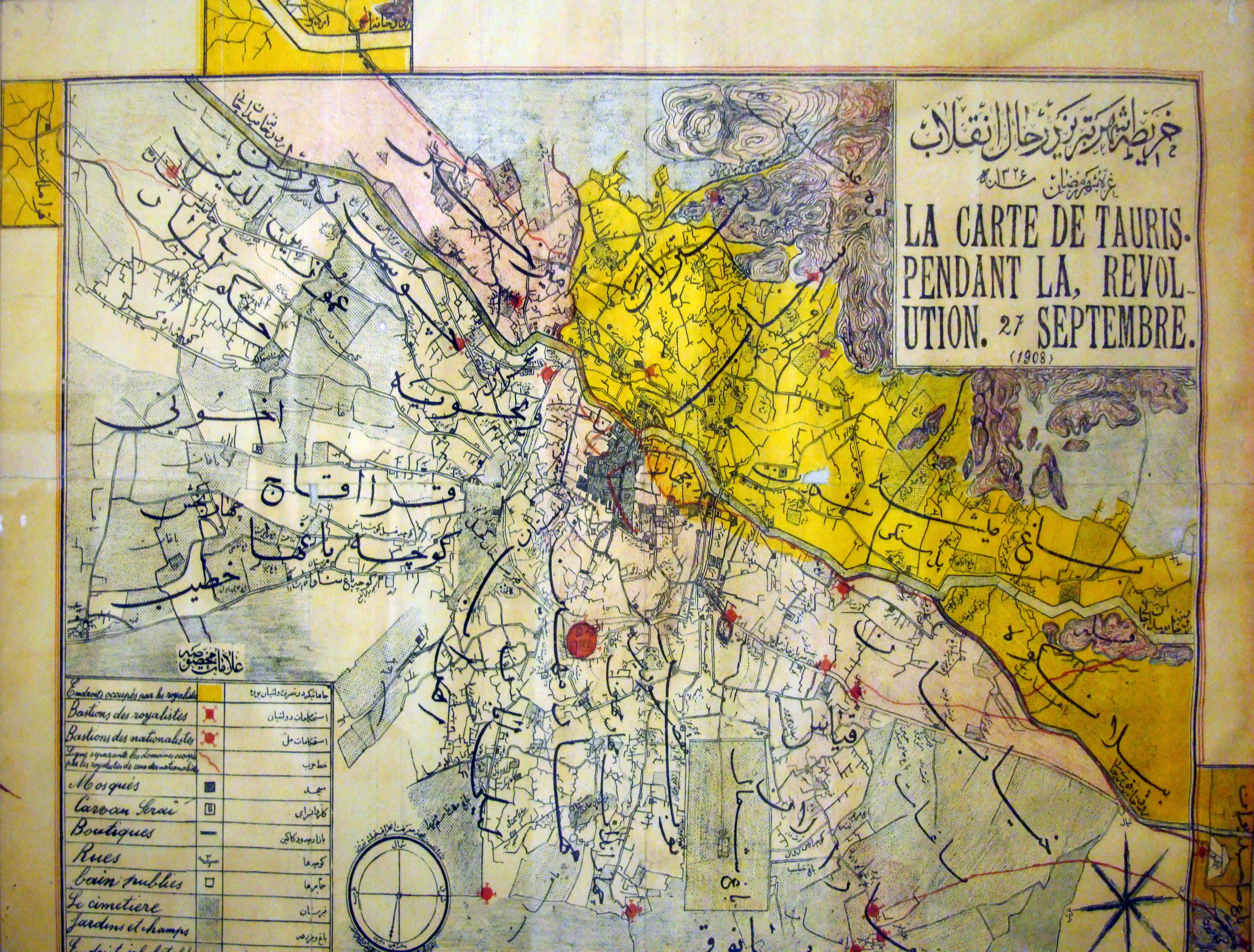
Map of the siege of Tabriz during Constitutional Revolution, on 27 September 1908.

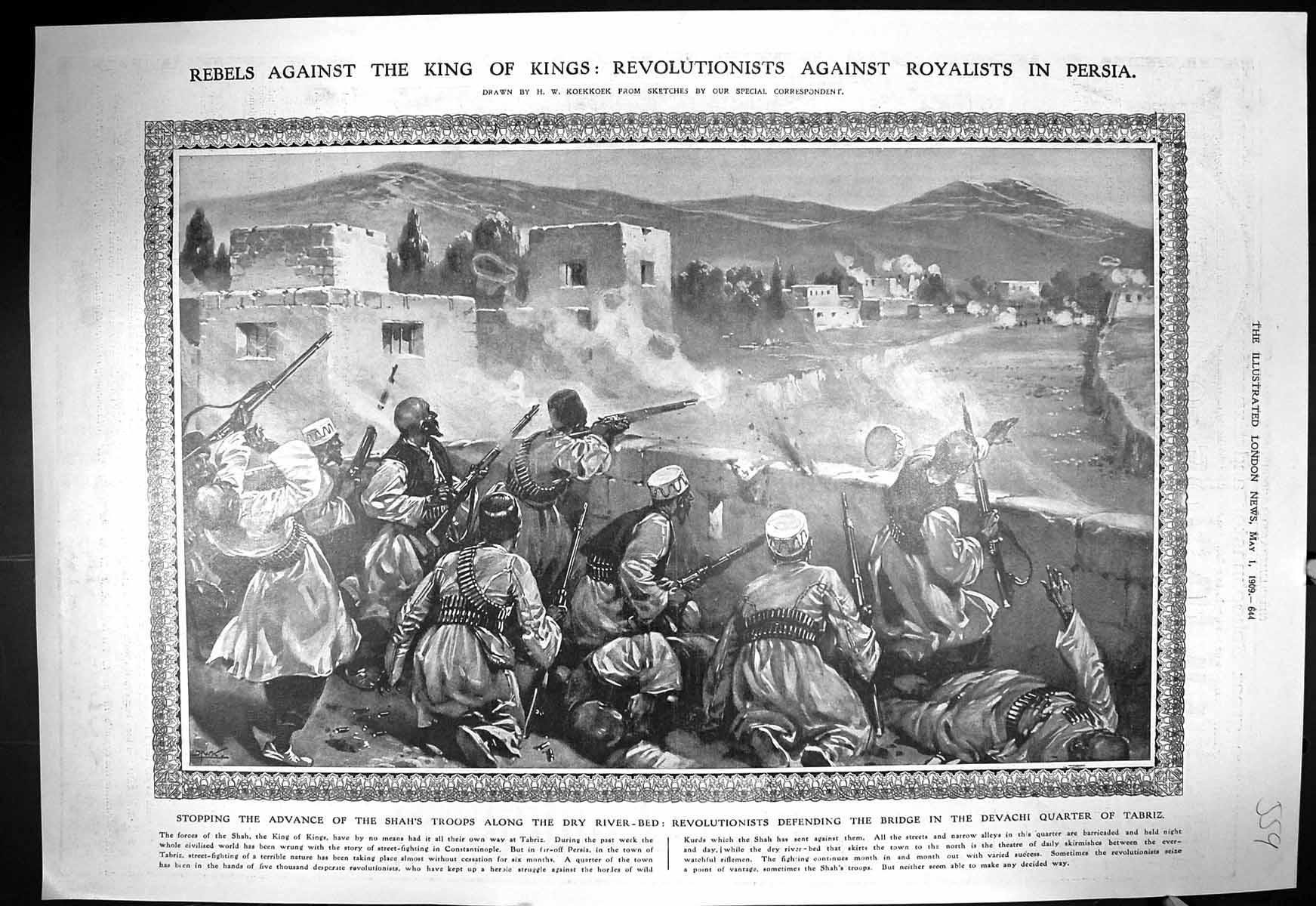
A sketch of revolutionists defending Davachi bridge in London News, Tabriz (1 May 1909).

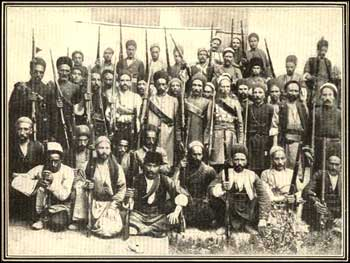
Constitutionals in Tabriz, early 20th century.

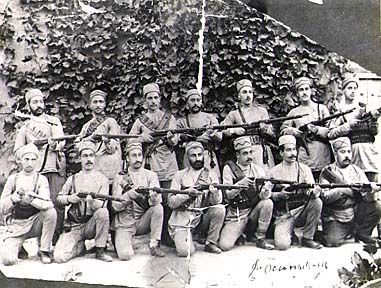
Constitutional forces in Tabriz, early 20th century.

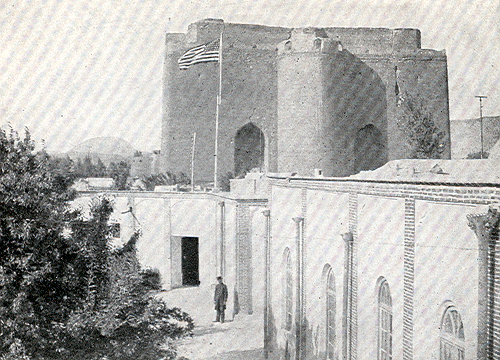
Ark of Tabriz and US Flag in the days after constitutional revolution, 1911.

=== Tabriz invasion during WWII ===
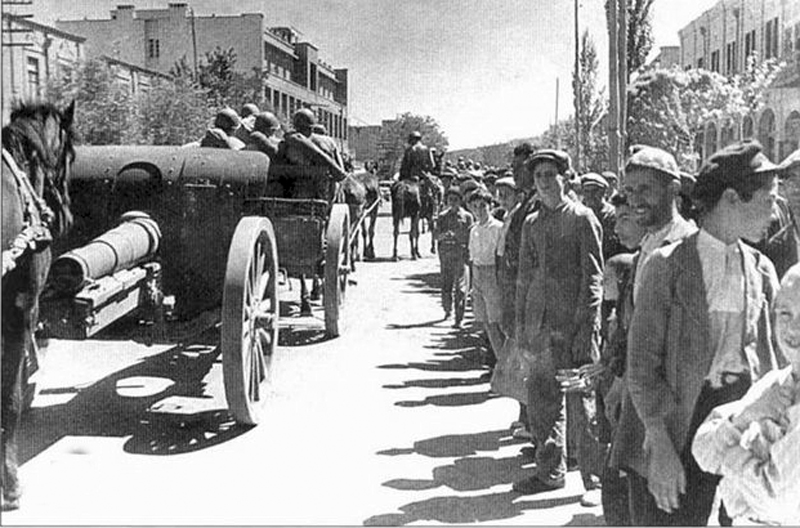
Soviet artillery units in passing through Tabriz, 1940s

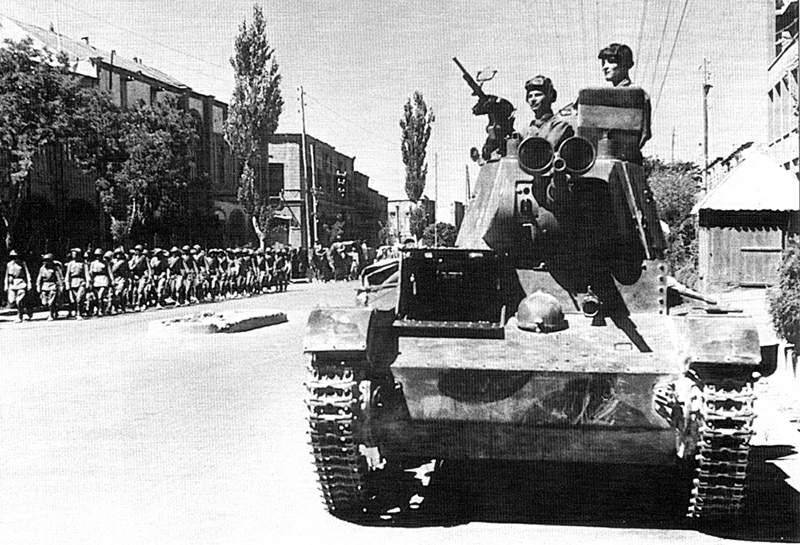
Soviet Tank and troops marching through Tabriz, 1940s

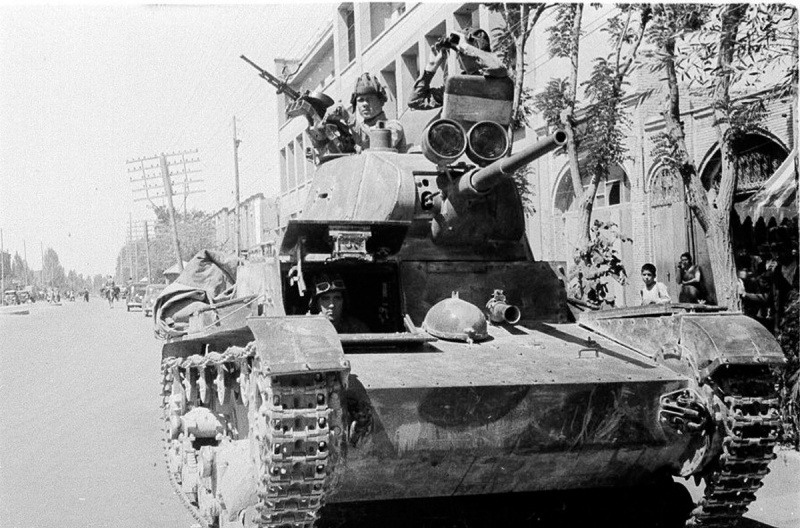
Soviet T-26 Tank passing through main street of Tabriz, 1940s
