= Sadegh Najafi-Khazarlou =

Iranian politician

Mayor of Tabriz
- In office 15 October 2013 – 24 September 2017
- Preceded by: Alireza Novin
- Succeeded by: Iraj Shahin-Baher

Personal details
- Born: c. 1960 (age 65–66) Khezerlu, Ajab Shir, Iran

Sadegh Najafi-Khazarlou (Persian: صادق نجفی) is an Iranian politician and the fifty-fifth mayor of Tabriz. He was elected by the Islamic City Council of Tabriz on 13 October 2013 and was inaugurated on 15 October 2013 in Saat City Hall.His tenure in Tabriz Municipality ended in 2017.

Civic offices
Preceded by Alireza Novin	Mayor of Tabriz; 2013–2017	Succeeded by Iraj Shahin Baher
