= Tabriz Cartoon =

Building in Iran

Tabriz Cartoon is an annual international caricature competition held in Tabriz, Iran since 2002.

== History ==
Tabriz cartoon museum is the first and only cartoon and caricature museum in Iran and it is also one of the five official cartoon museums in the world. After the House of Humor and Satire in Gabrovo, Bulgaria, it is the second widest museum in the world. This museum was playing the host to the second meeting of the heads of cartoon museums in the world, which there was representatives of countries such as Italy, France, Turkey, Azerbaijan, Syria, and Belgium. It was established in the west part of Tabriz Art Home in March 2007. It is affiliated with the department of culture but it doesn't have any annual budget. Its funds are generated from cartoonists society income and the government's financial support. The building infrastructure has been created with an area of 284 m. at the same time with Tabriz Municipal House in 1318 and it has been used as Officers Club, restaurant, Islamic Revolutions' Committee, Tabriz National Library, and at last Tabriz cartoon museum over the years. It consists of two galleries with 60 original artworks of the most prominent world's cartoonists, a special library, classes and administrative division. There are stored two thousand original artworks from a hundred countries in the museum archive. This museum is the place of the Tabriz cartoonists' society which has hosted many international festivals like twelve courses of Tabriz Festival, six courses of Tabriz Citizenship Festival, a resistance festival, and some courses of the national festival. A set of foreign festivals' albums and foreign publications are the other products and activities of the museum.
