= Alireza Novin =

Former mayor of Tabriz, Iran (born 1961)

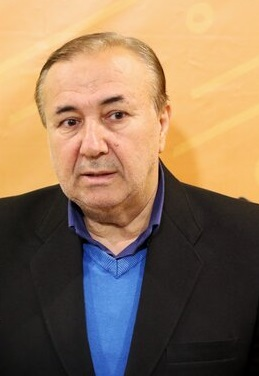

Member of the Parliament of Iran
- Incumbent
- Assumed office 27 May 2024
- Constituency: Tabriz, Osku and Azarshahr

Mayor of Tabriz
- In office 2006–2013
- Preceded by: Ehtesham Hajipour
- Succeeded by: Sadegh Najafi-Khazarlou

Personal details
- Born: 27 February 1961 (age 65) Tabriz, Iran
- Party: Moderation and Development Party
- Education: Tabriz University; Imam Hossein University
- Occupation: Politician

Alireza Novin (Persian: علیرضا نوین, born 27 February 1961)is an Iranian politician who is currently representing Tabriz, Osku and Azarshahr electoral district in the Parliament of Iran since 2024.

He is the former mayor of Tabriz, Iran. He was elected as 54th Mayor of Tabriz on 15 December 2005 by City Council and was inaugurated as mayor on 1 January 2006 in Saat City Hall.His tenure in Tabriz Municipality ended in 2013. He graduated from Tabriz University in management.

Political offices
Preceded by Ehtesham Hajipour	Mayor of Tabriz; 2006–2013	Succeeded by Sadegh Najafi-Khazarlou
