= Iraj Shahin-Baher =

Iranian politician

Iraj Shahin Baher
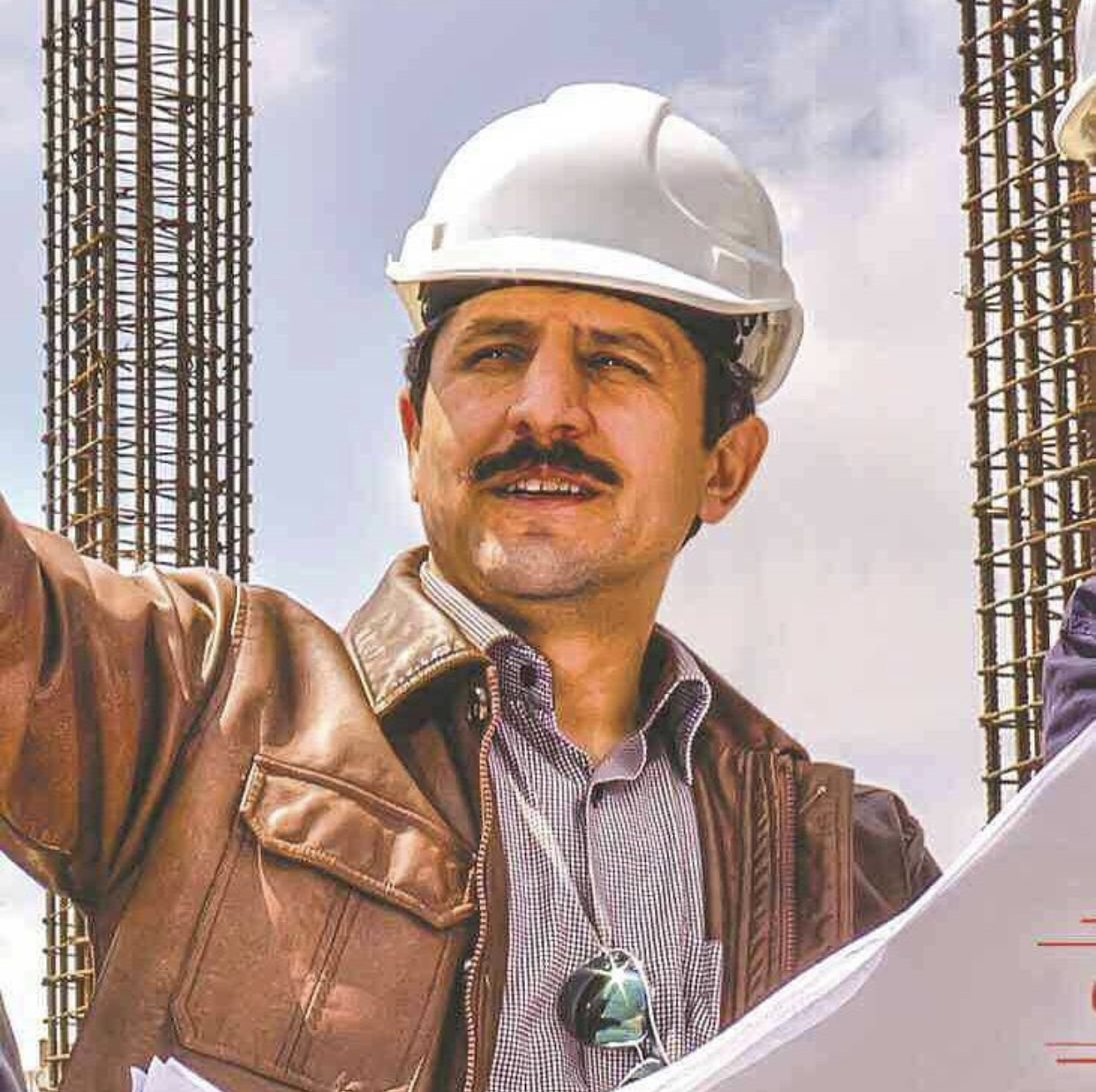

72nd Mayor of Tabriz
- In office 4 November 2017 – 5 August 2021
- Preceded by: Sadegh Najafi-Khazarlou
- Succeeded by: Abbas Ranjbar

Member of City Council of Tabriz
- In office 3 September 2013 – 22 August 2017; Alternative: 23 August – 23 September 2017

Personal details
- Born: c. 1972 (age 53–54) Tabriz, Iran

Iraj Shahin-Baher (Persian: ایرج شهین‌باهر) is an Iranian politician and the fifty-sixth mayor of Tabriz. He was elected by the Islamic City Council of Tabriz in September 2017 and was inaugurated on same year in Saat City Hall. His tenure in Tabriz Municipality ended in 2021.

Civic offices
Preceded by Sadegh Najafi-Khazarlou	Mayor of Tabriz; 2017–2021	Succeeded by Abbas Ranjbar
