= Tabriz National Library =

Tabriz Central Library
- کتابخانه مرکزی تبریز
- 38.07764845894858°N 46.25485091799372°E
- Location: Tabriz, Iran
- Established: 1956

Other information
- Website: http://tcpl.blogfa.com/

The Tabriz Central Library (Persian: کتابخانه ملی تبریز), formerly Tabriz National Library, was founded in 1956 by Hajj Mohammad Nakhjavani with help from the people of Tabriz, Iran. It contains several handwritten books. The library is called National because of its non-benefit and non-governmental structure. Initially the library started by the books which are gathered by people specially by Nakhjavani, the building also constructed without any government investment.

The original building was in the vicinity of Ark. After the revolution the initial building was destroyed by clerical hardliners in 1978 and the books moved to other buildings near to the Golestan Park, when they were destroying the historic Tabriz City Theater building that was placed behind the library building to make a new mosque.

Currently a new modern building is made for the library by the Iranian Ministry of Culture.

== See also ==
- List of libraries in Iran
