= Sa'at Tower =

Municipality Palace of Tabriz, Iran

- برج ساعت
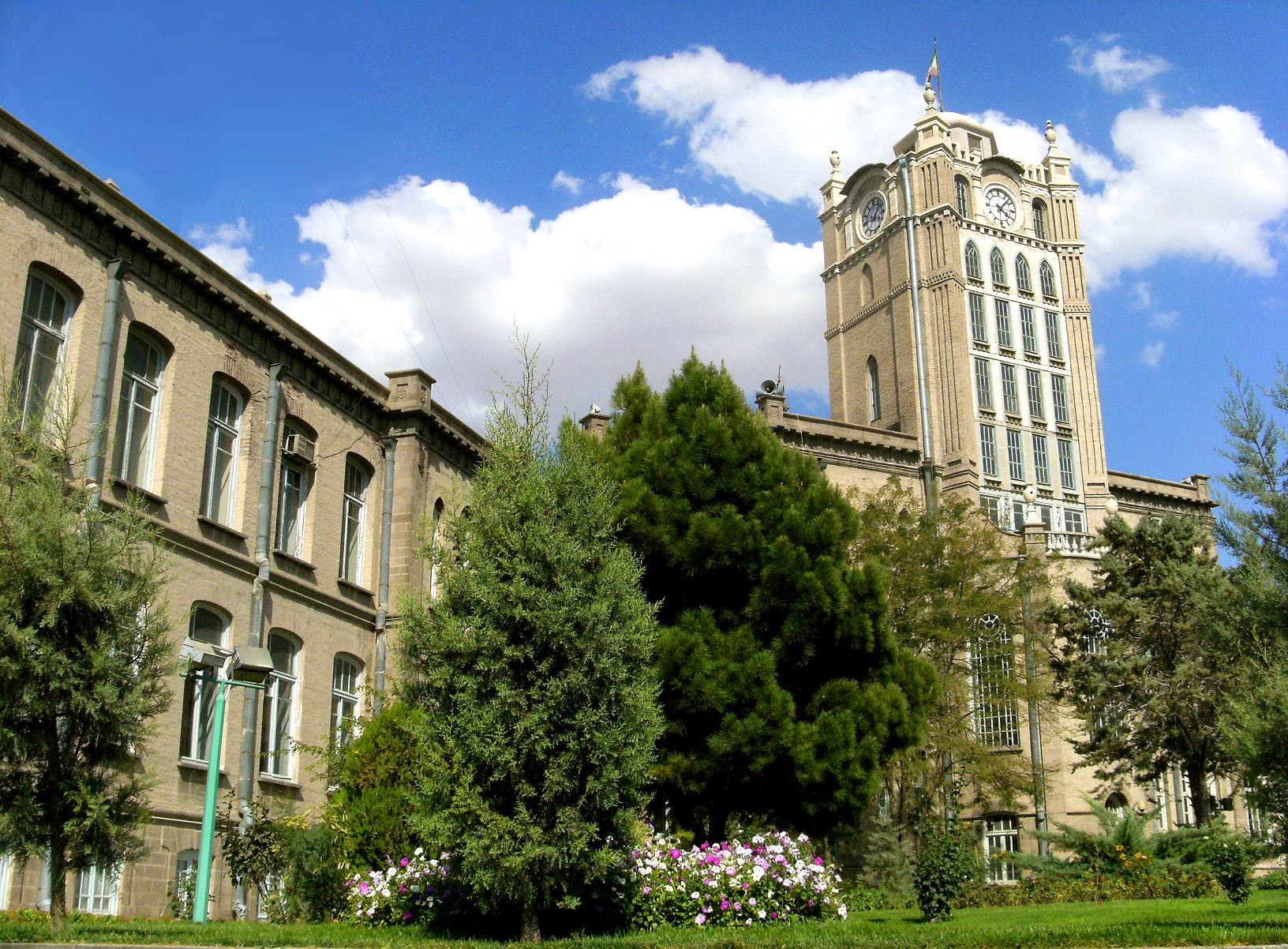
- South-western side of Sa'at Tower

General information
- Type: Municipality; Clock tower
- Location: Tabriz, Iran
- Coordinates: 38°04′25″N 46°17′44″E
- Completed: 1934

Design and construction
- Architect: Avedis Ohanjanian

Sa'at Tower (Persian: برج ساعت) also known as Tabriz Municipality Palace (Persian: کاخ شهرداری تبریز) is a building in Tabriz which is used as the city hall and main office of the municipal government of Tabriz, East Azarbaijan Province, Iran. The Municipality Palace features a hall, a clock tower, and a small garden.

== History ==
Before World War II it was used by the Azerbaijan Democrat Party as the Government Office. When Iranian troops regained control of Tabriz in 1947, the building was again used as the Tabriz municipal central office. In the early 2000s parts of it became a municipal museum.

During the 1980s, in an attempt to install an elevator, one of Sa'at's patios was damaged. Since 2007, part of the building houses the Municipal Museum.

== Architecture ==
The building has an area of about 9,600 square meters and 6,500 square meters of infrastructure built on three floors. Tabriz Municipality Palace has a four-page clock tower with a height of 30.5 meters with the rhythmic resonance of its bells, every hour, it brings the passage of time to the ears of the people of Tabriz. The exterior of the building is carved out of stone and the plan of the building is similar to the design of a flying eagle, which corresponds to the example of buildings in Germany before World War II.

== Museum of Municipality ==
In recent years parts of the building is reorganized as municipality museum of Tabriz.

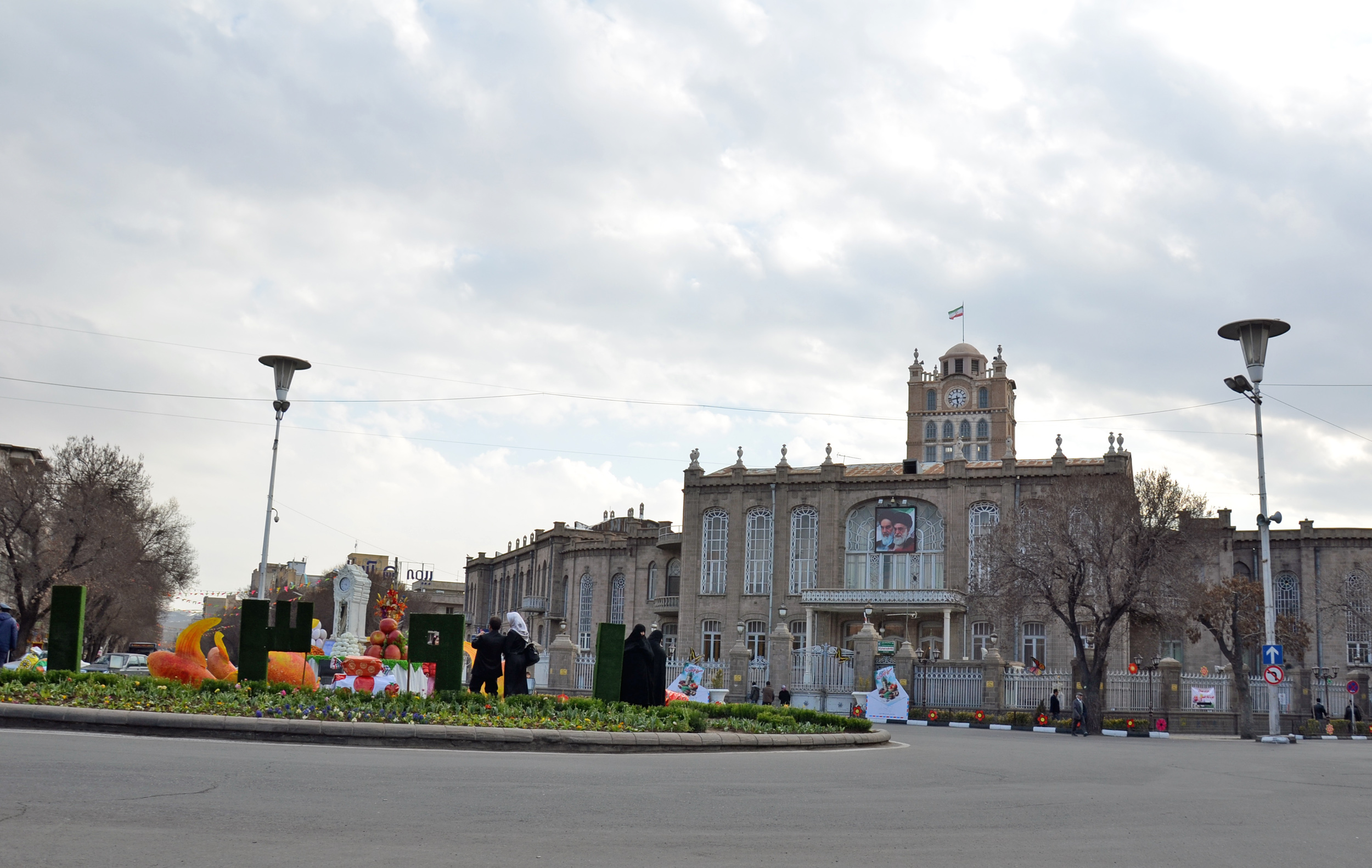
Northern side of Sa'at Tower and municipality building from Sa'at square.

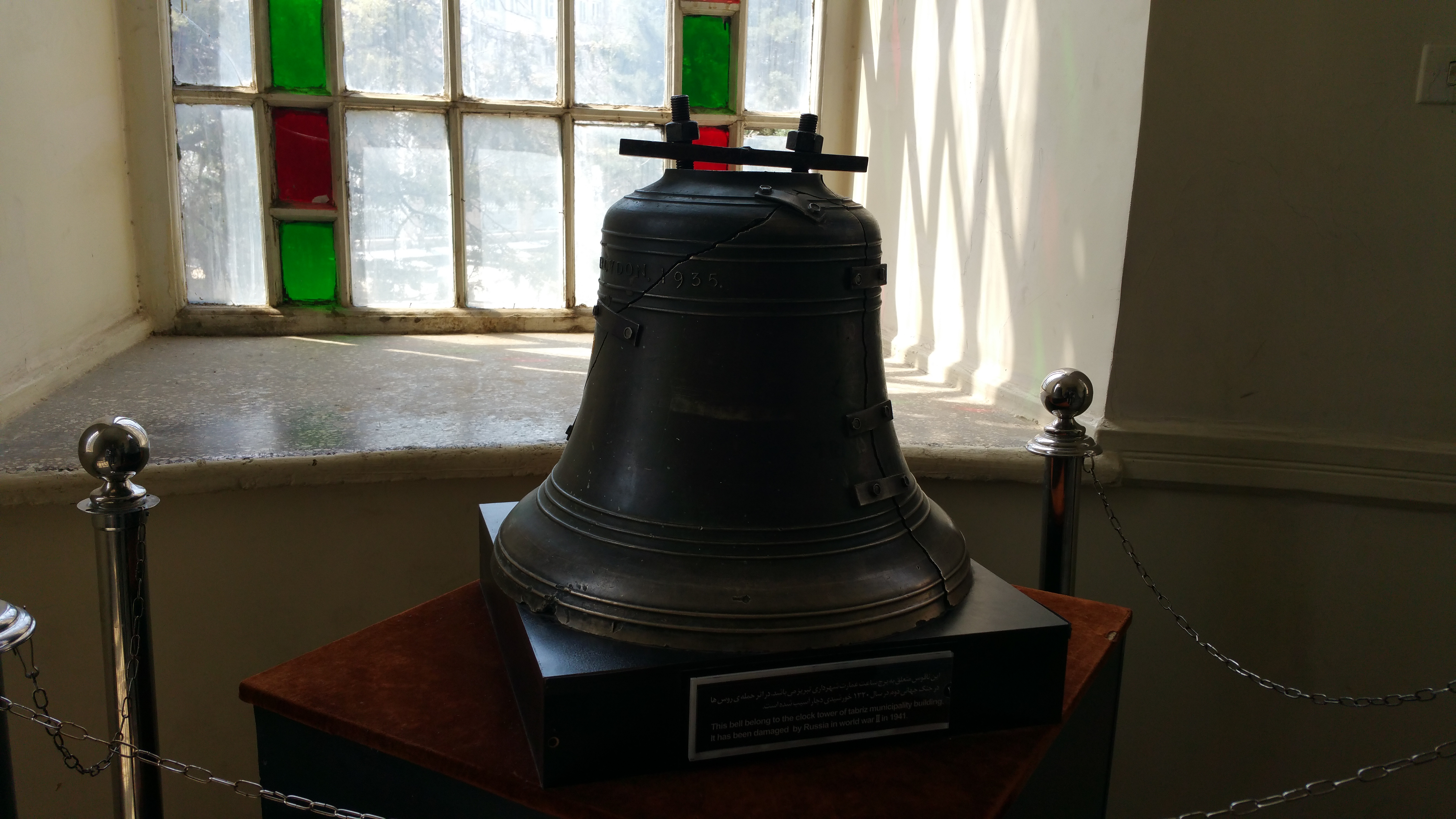
Former bell of Sa'at Tower which was damaged during the Russian invasion of Tabriz during World War II. The bell was later replaced by a new one.

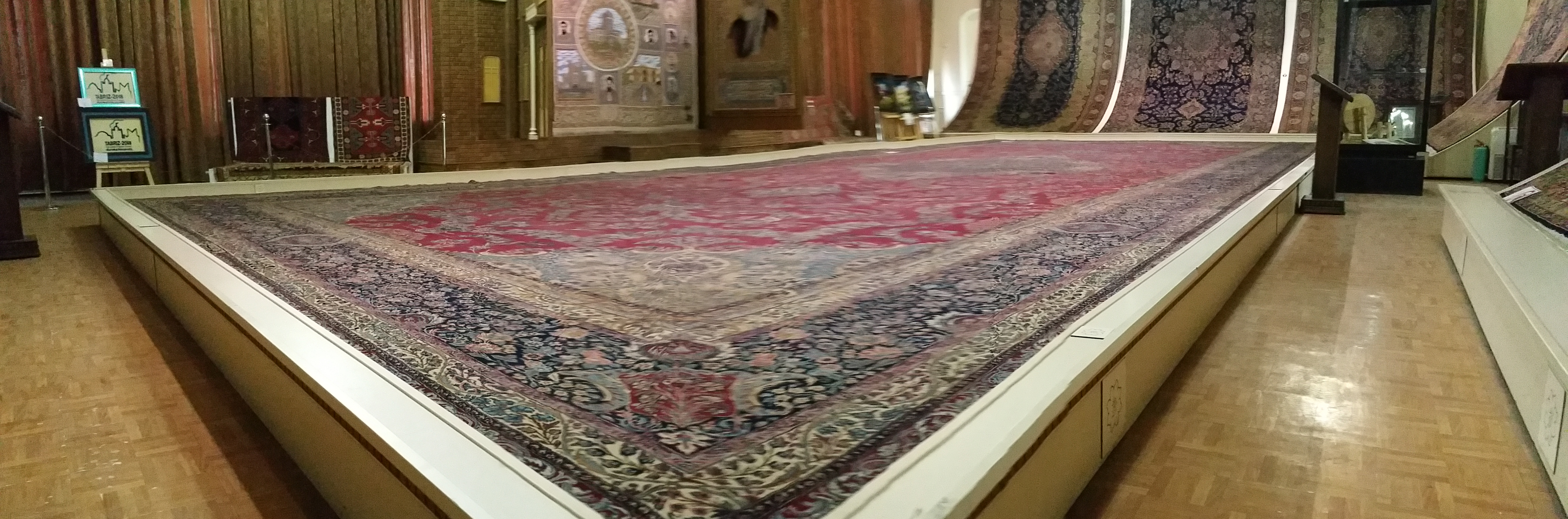
Main hall of Sa'at tower, currently used as a show room for Tabriz municipality's rug collection.

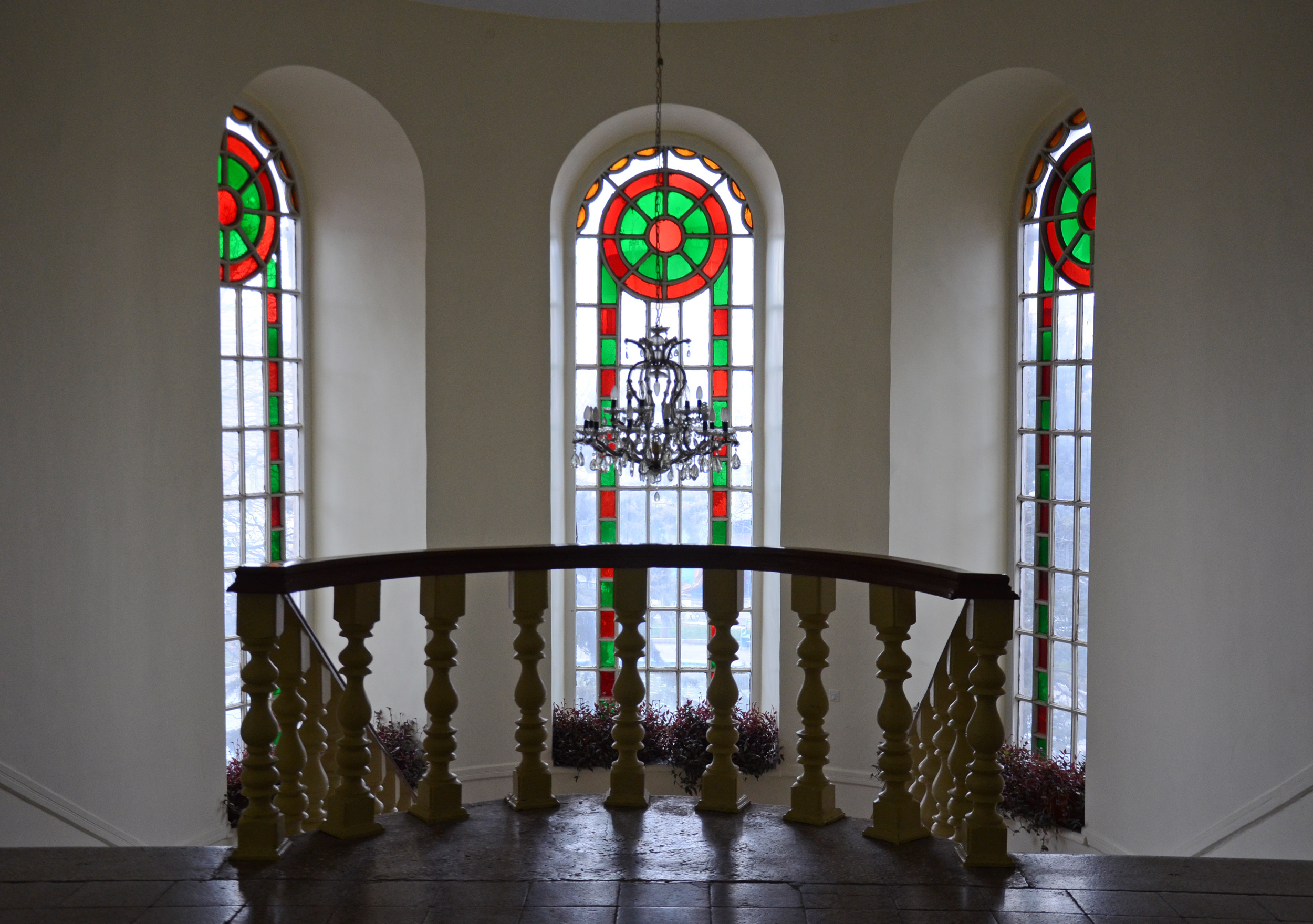
Interior of Sa'at tower, under the southern Iwan.

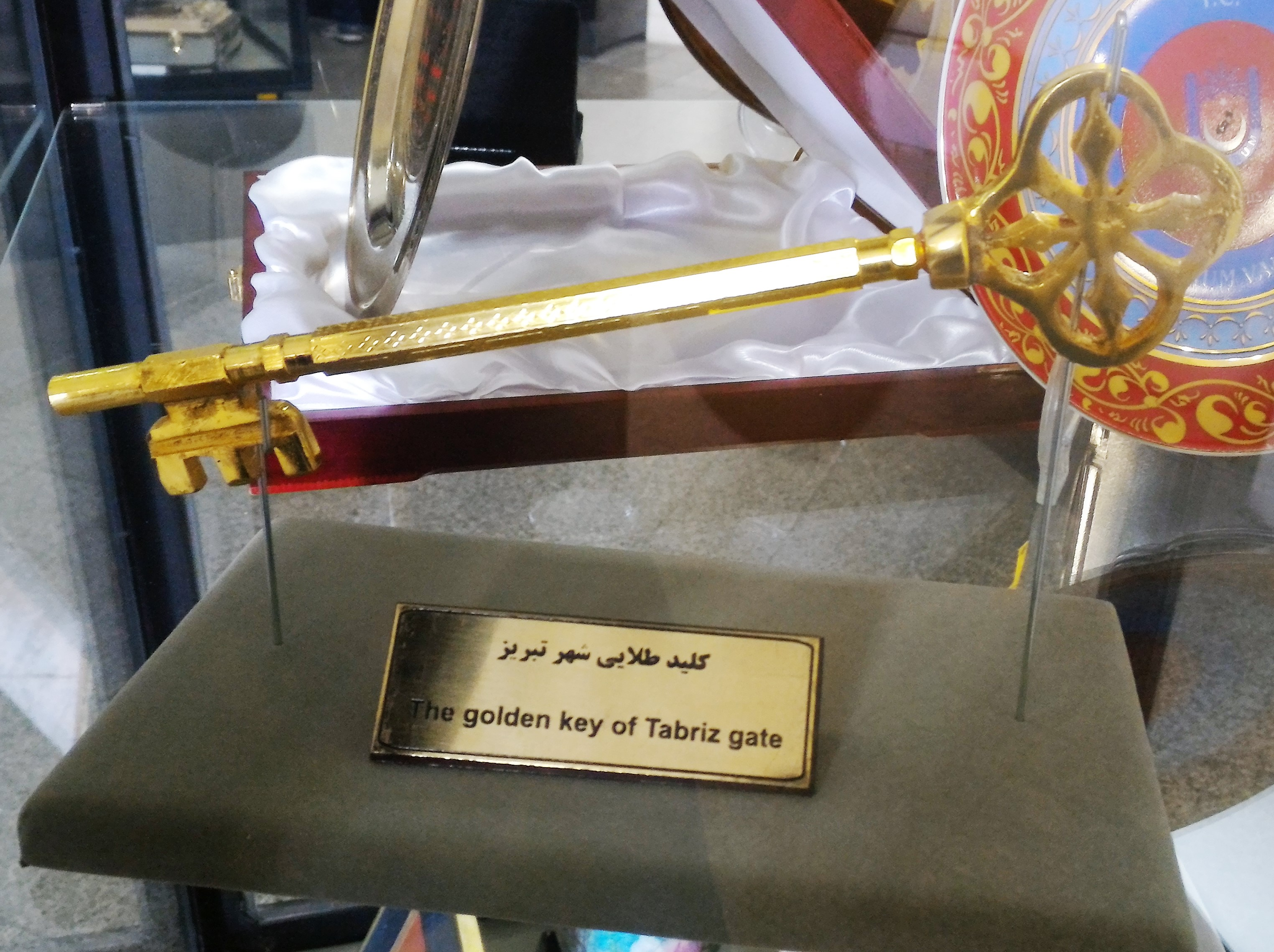
Golden key of Tabriz.

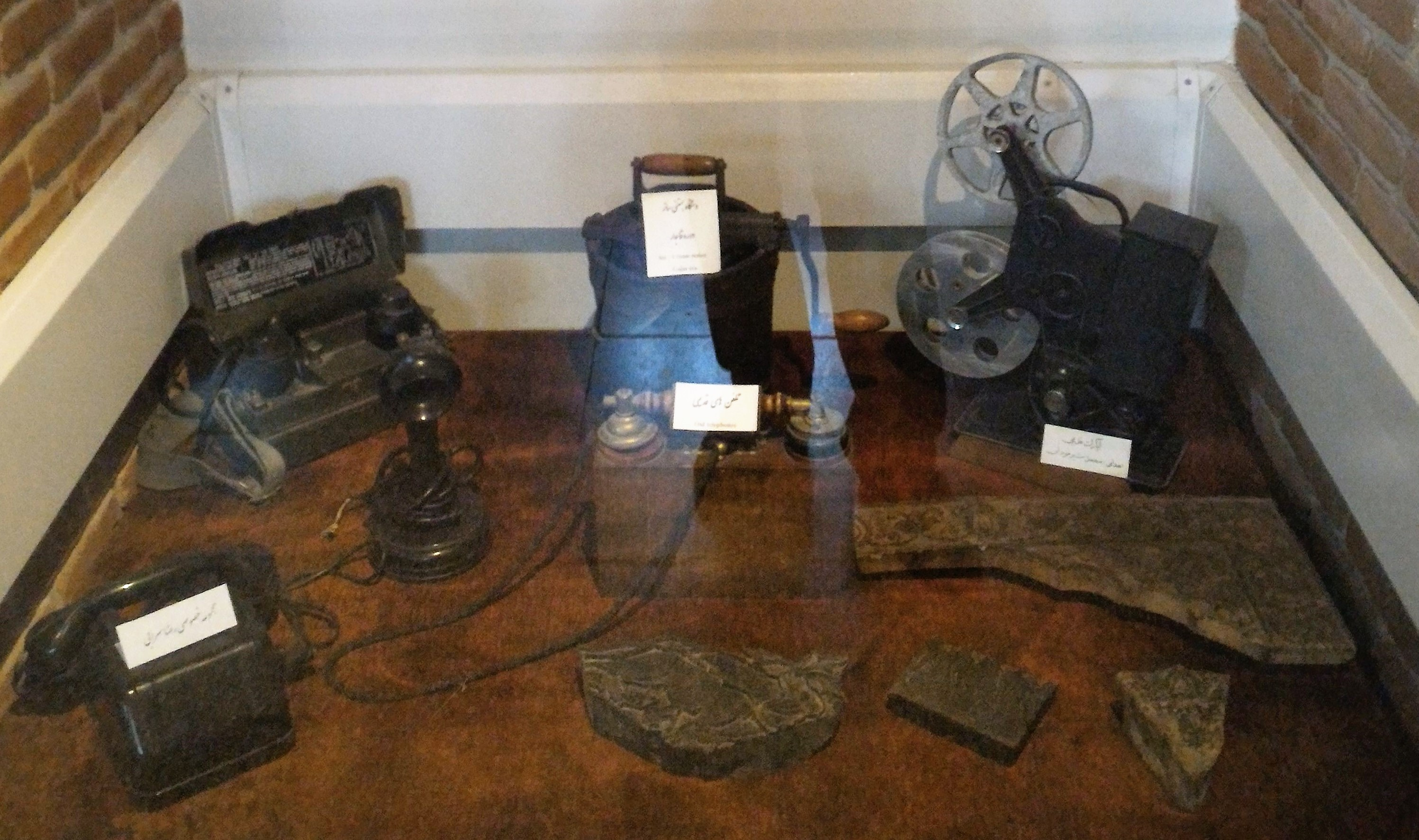
Some of the equipment presented in municipality museum.

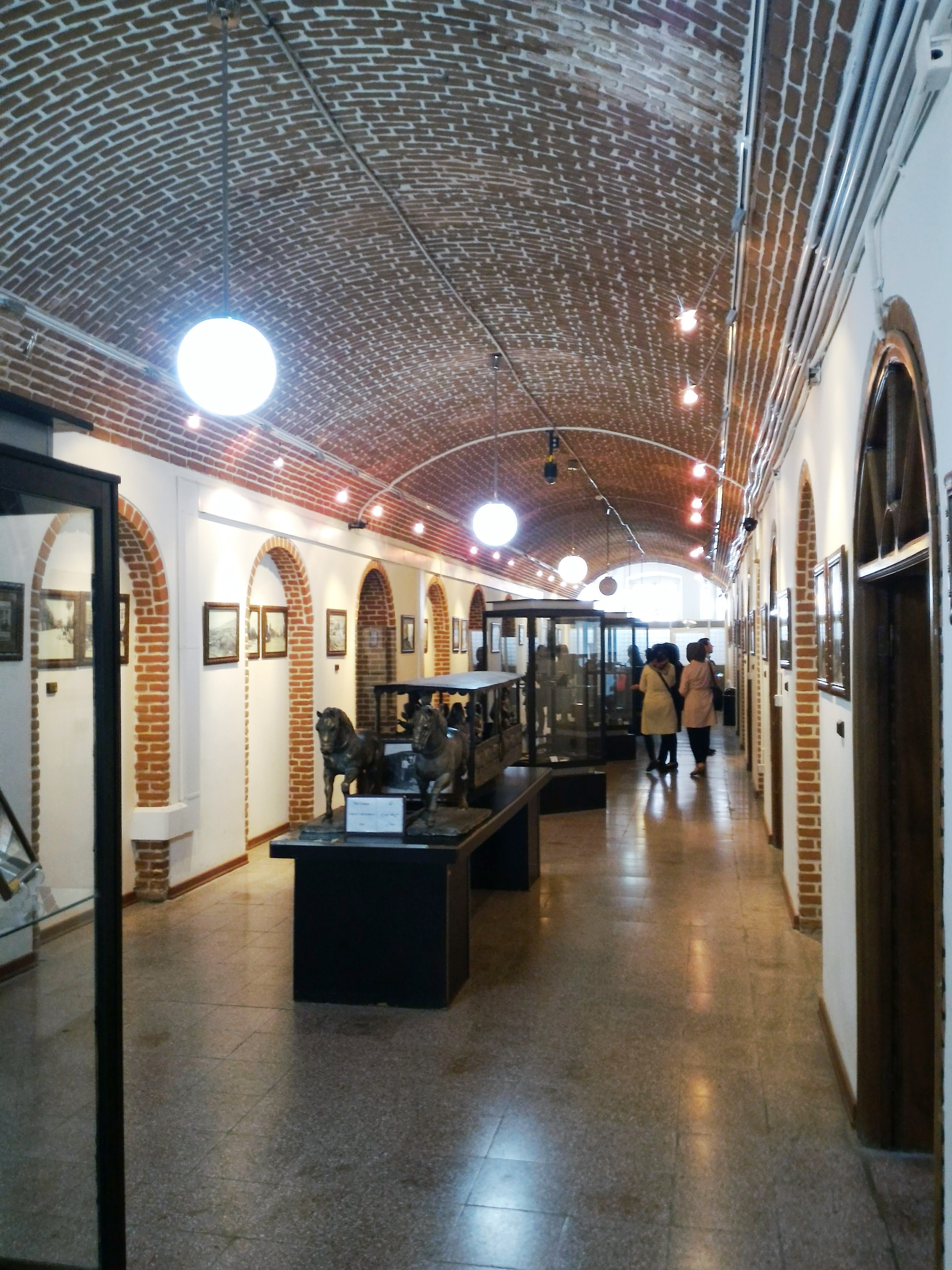
Basement passage of municipality building.

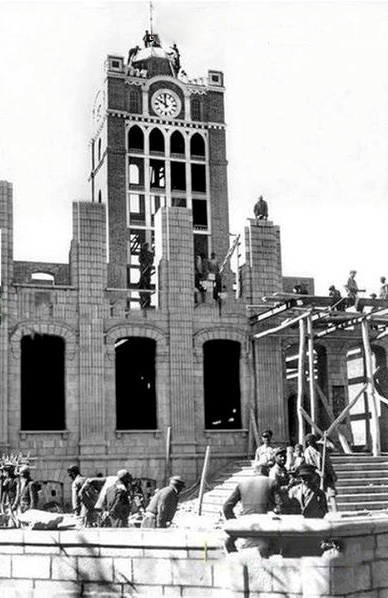
Sa'at under construction, 1930s.

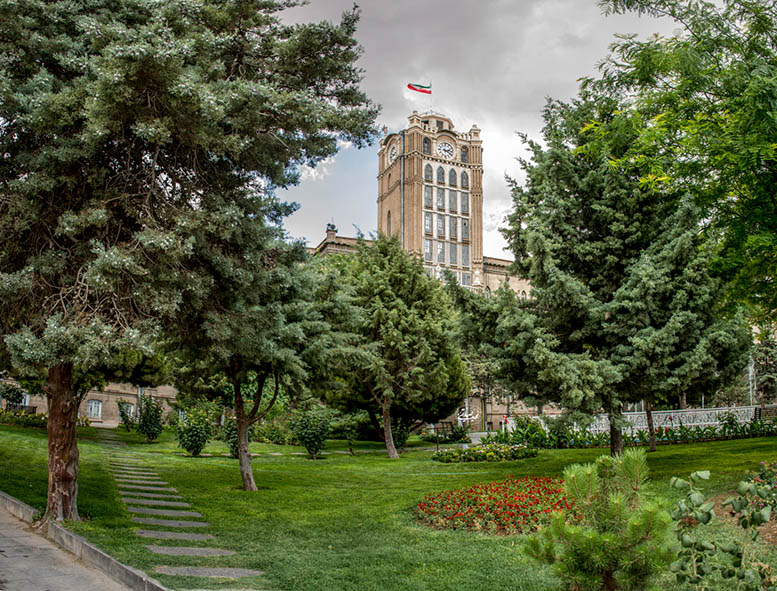
Western side of Municipality Building and Sa'at Tower, a view from the municipality garden.

== Ceremonies ==
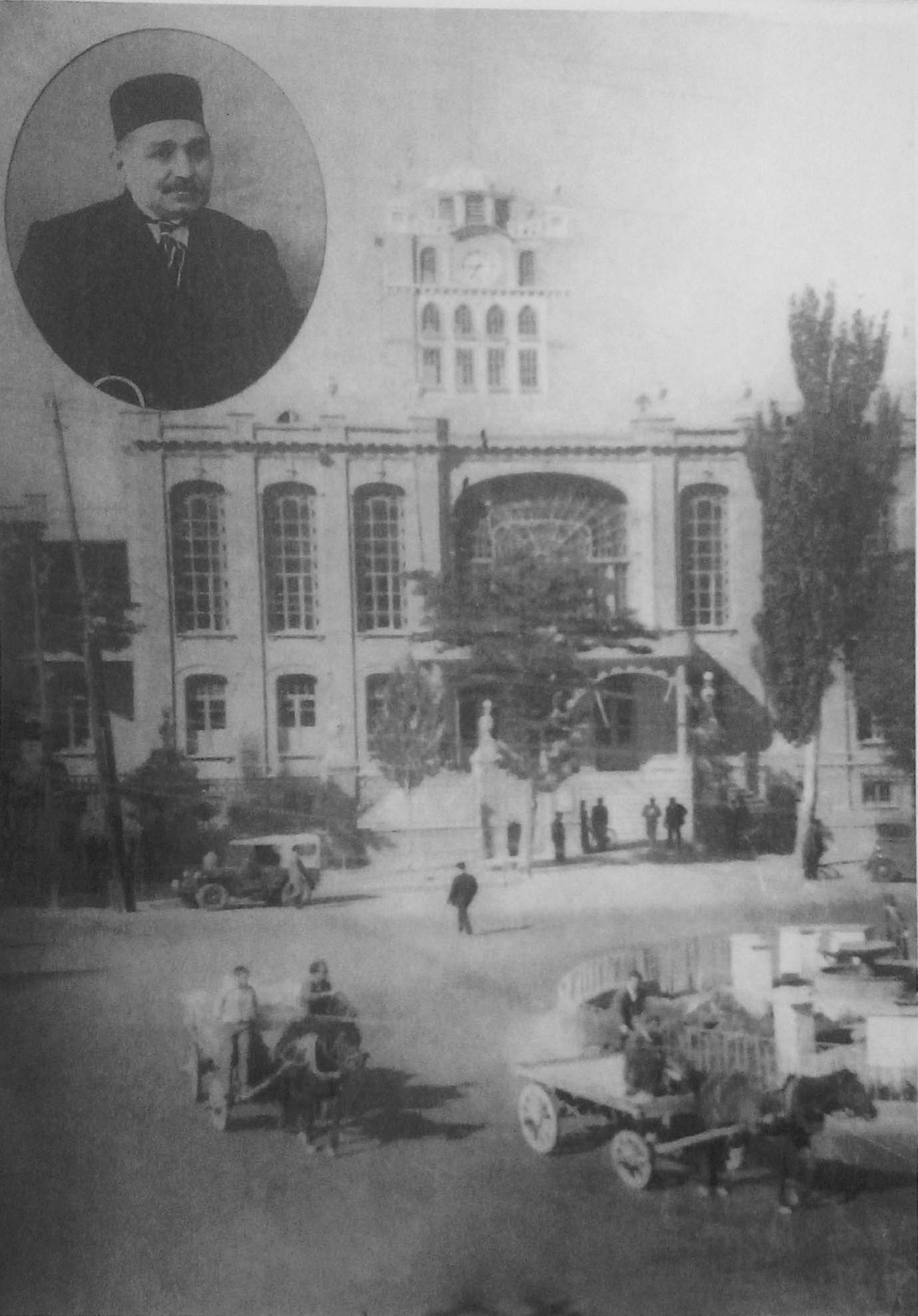
Tabriz Municipality Square in 1941 and the image of Arfa Al-Molk Jalili, the then mayor, who was the founder of this mansion

Since Sa'at Tower is located in the center of the city, it has been used for various ceremonies and gatherings in the city.

- Iranian new year, at the beginning of every new Iranian Year (20 March), a big Haft-sin is made behind Sa'at.
- Earth hour, since 2014 Tabriz celebrates the earth hour by turning off the lights for Sa'at Tower.

== Etymology ==
Sa'at means "clock", which refers to the four face clock in top of the tower.
