= Elham Fakhari =

Iranian reformist politician

Member of City Council of Tehran
- In office 23 August 2017 – 4 August 2021

Chairwoman of the Islamic Council of Tehran Province
- In office 16 April 2017 – 16 April 2021

Manager of Psychological Counseling Center and Publications "Maani"
- In office 1 September 2020 – Until now

Personal details
- Born: September 21, 1975 (age 51) Isfahan, Iran
- Party: Reformist, National Trust Party
- Education: Alzahra University, Isfahan University
- Profession: Psychologist
- Website: http://elhamfakhari.ir

Elham Fakhari (Persian: الهام فخاری; born 1975 in Isfahan) is a psychologist, Politician, writer, painter, poet, member of the Central Council of the National Trust Party, and a former member of the City Council of Tehran, Ray, and Tajrish.

== Activities ==
Elham Fakhari is a psychologist and university lecturer with a PhD in educational psychology from Al-Zahra University, a reformist politician, and a member of the Central Council (National Committee) of the National Trust Party elected representative of the people of Tehran with 1,112,126 votes In the fifth term of the Tehran City Council, she is the former vice-chairwoman of the Cultural and Social Commission and the former chairwoman of the Art Committee, the Social Committee and the Child-Friendly City Committee of the Tehran City Council. On November 22, 2016, at the Tehran Province Council meeting, Elham Fakhari was elected as the head of the Tehran Province Council. She is the first woman head of the council in the history of Tehran city and province councils. Also, she was a spokeswoman, a member of the board of directors and former public relations officer of the Supreme Policy Council of Reformists, a former member of the Council of Shemiranat County, periodic head of the Coordination Council of the Reformists Front of Iran. she is a painter, writer, and poet. Her last exhibition was the "Steps of Liberation" painting, which was held in Tehran in 2022 and his specialized books and poems have also been published.

== Judicial Summons ==
Elham Fakhari was summoned to the Islamic Revolutionary Court to the complaint of the former CEO of Hamshahri newspaper and also because of the tweet he published about Saeed Toosi. Elham Fakhari, who wanted to start an Inspection and investigation progress investigate the Hamshahri newspaper and the financial corruption inside it, faced a complaint from Mehdi Zakari, the former CEO of the Hamshahri Institute.

After the acquittal of Saeed Toosi, a Quran reciter close to the Office of the leader, in the case of sexual abuse of teenagers, she criticized this sentence by publishing a message on Twitter and considered it to contain a bad message for society. This tweet of her was also one of the reasons for summoning her to the Islamic Revolutionary Court. Finally, by appearing in court and presenting documents, Fakhari was acquitted.

== Expulsion from the university ==
Elham Fakhari, who was teaching Bachelor and Master courses at the Faculty of Psychology and Educational Sciences of Allameh Tabatabai University (ATU), after more than 5 years of teaching and despite going through the process of being recruited into the faculty of this university, With the opposition of the Ministry of Science and the security and governance institutions in Iran, her teaching contract was not renewed and she was expelled from the university

== Positions ==
- Director in charge of "Avaay Maani" Publishing

- Director in charge of "Maani" Counseling and Psychology Clinic

- Member of the "Contemporary Visual Arts Development Institute"

- Member of the Central Council of the National Trust Party

- Member and former vice-chairman of the Cultural and Social Commission of Tehran City Council

- Former head of "art" committee, "social" committee, and "child-friendly city" committee of Tehran City Council

- Former Chairwoman of the Tehran Province Council

- Former member of Iran's Reform Front

- Alternate member of Isfahan City Council - second period

- Spokesman and former public relations officer of the Supreme Policy Council of Reformists

- Former member of the Supreme Policy Council of Reformists

- The first woman Head of the council in Tehran province

- Former member of Shemiranat County Council

- Periodic head of the coordination council of the reform front of Iran

- Former member of the Education Council of the Tehran province

- Member of think room of innovators and entrepreneurs Iran Chamber of Commerce, Industries, Mines & Agriculture

- Top entrepreneur of Isfahan province (2006)

- Top researcher of Al-Zahra University (2013)

- Former lecturer of Allameh Tabatabai, Al-Zahra and Azad Islamic universities

- Former member of the Central Council of "Islamic Iran Freedom and Justice Organization"

== Books ==
- The psychology book Learning Together in class - Sales Publications

- The poetry book "Smell of Calendula" from Elham Fakhari's poetry collection - Nasira Publications

- The poetry book "echo of Words" from Elham Fakhari's poetry collection - Nasira Publications

== Election records ==
Year	Election	Votes	٪	Rank	Result	Constituency	Source
2003	Iranian local elections 2003	/	/	14	Alternate	Isfahan City Council	
2008	Iranian legislative election 2008	-	-	-	Disqualification	Isfahan & Varzaneh Electoral district	-
2016	Iranian legislative election 2016	-	-	-	Disqualification	Tehran, Rey, Shemiranat Electoral district	-
2017	Iranian local elections 2017	1,112,126	%30/7	19	Victory	Tehran, Rey & Tajrish City Council	
2021	Iranian local elections 2021	25,885	%2/3	45	Failure	Tehran, Rey & Tajrish City Council	

Party political offices
New title	Secretary and Public Relations Officer of the Supreme Policy Council of Iran Reformists; 2014–2021	Succeeded by -
