= Mehdi Jamalinejad =

Iranian politician and writer

- مهدی جمالی‌نژاد
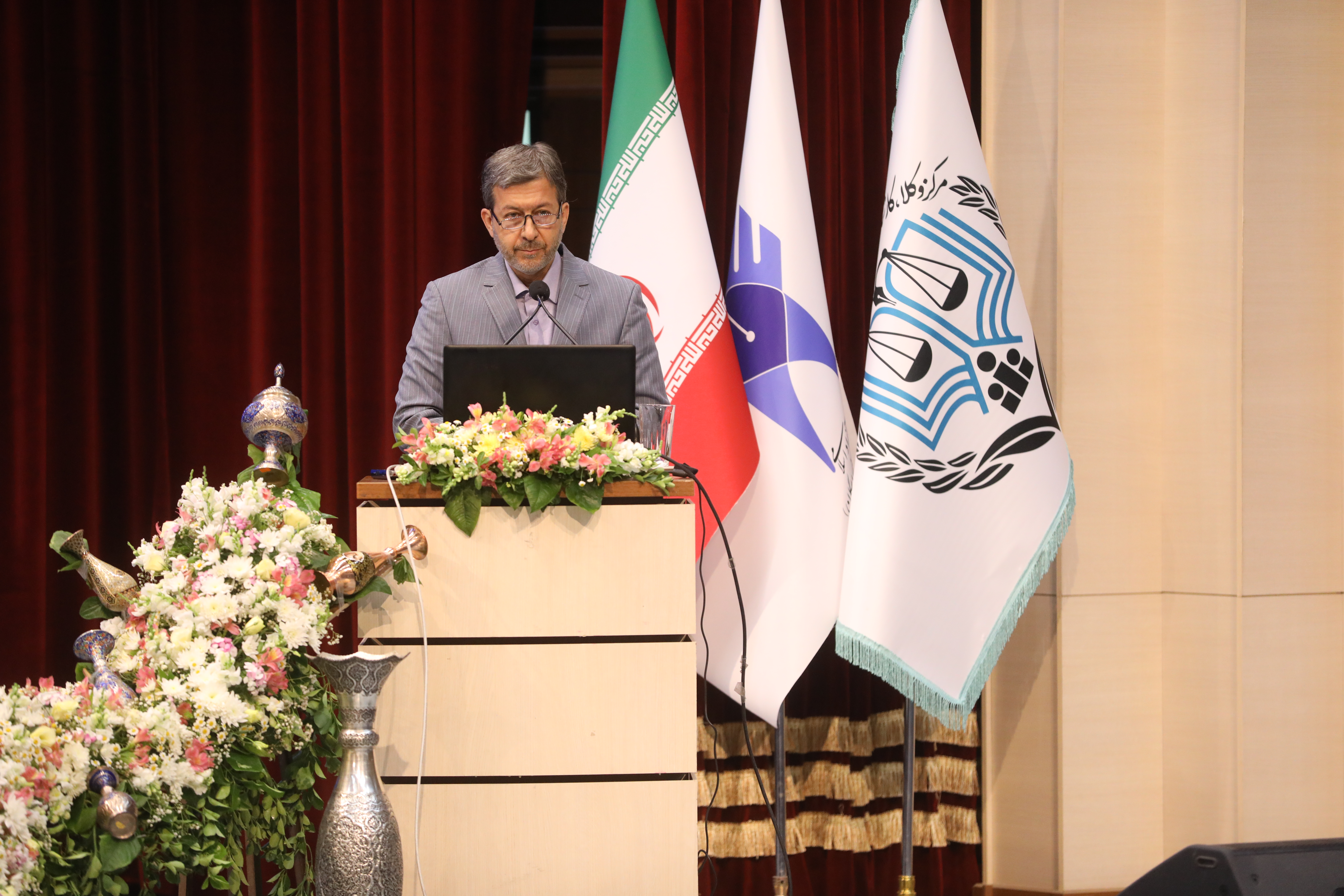

Governor General of Isfahan
- Incumbent
- Assumed office 15 October 2024
- President: Masoud Pezeshkian
- Preceded by: Reza Mortazavi

Mayor of Yazd
- In office 26 August 2017 – 26 September 2018
- Preceded by: Mohammad Reza Azimizadeh
- Succeeded by: Mojtaba Farahmand

Mayor of Isfahan
- In office 21 June 2015 – 22 August 2017
- Preceded by: Morteza Saghaeiannejad
- Succeeded by: Ghodratollah Norouzi

Personal details
- Born: 1969 (age 56–57) Isfahan, Iran
- Education: Adab High School
- Alma mater: University of Isfahan
- Website: Official website

Mehdi Jamalinejad (Persian: مهدی جمالی‌نژاد, born 1969) is an Iranian writer and principlist politician who currently serves as the governor general of Isfahan province since 2024. He was Deputy Minister of Interior in Civil and Development of Urban and Rural Affairs and Head of Municipalities and Village Administrations Organization from September 2018 to October 2024.

He was elected as Mayor of Yazd city from 2017 to 2018. Previously he was served as Mayor of Isfahan from 2015 to 2017, succeeding Morteza Saghaian Nejad, who held the position from 2003 to 2015. He was the city's youngest Mayor of Isfahan since 1979, and previously held positions in the city's municipality like Deputy Mayor in Civil affairs. He was also CEO of Malaysia based I.S. GOSTAR M company.
