= Mayor of Isfahan =

Leader of Isfahan, Iran

- Incumbent; Ali Ghasemzadeh since 16 September 2021
- Residence: Shahrdari's Building
- Appointer: City Council
- Term length: Four–year term

The Mayor of Isfahan is the head of the municipal government of Isfahan, Iran. The mayor is appointed by the City Council of Isfahan and serves a four-year term. The current mayor is Ali Ghasemzadeh, who has held the position since 16 September 2021.

== Mayors of Isfahan ==
Name	Term
Seyyed Hosein Alavi	1979–1981
AbdoulHosein Seyfollahi	1981
Hassan Derakhshandeh Pour	1981–1983
Mohammad-Hassan Malekmadani	1983–1990
Hamid Reza Nikkar	1990–1992
Hamid Reza Azimian	1992–1997
Mohammad Ali Javadi	1997–2003
Morteza Saghaeiannejad	2003–2015
Mehdi Jamalinejad	2015–2017
Ghodratollah Norouzi	2017–2021
Ali Ghasemzadeh	2021–present

== See also ==
- Isfahan
- Timeline of Isfahan
