= Hajati =

Hajati (Persian: حاجتی) is a Persian surname that may refer to the following notable people:

- Mehdi Hajati, Iranian political activist
- Mir Ahmad Reza Hajati (born 1967), Iranian ayatollah
- Mostafa Hajati (born 1983), Iranian football player
- Ronela Hajati (born 1989), Albanian singer, songwriter and dancer
