= Isfahan University of Technology Central Library =

Research library in Iran

Isfahan University of Technology library كتابخانه مركزي و انتشارات is a research library at the Isfahan University of Technology, Iran. It was created in 1978 and moved to a new building in 2008. It has a study hall and a Latin book repository. The library contains around 300,000 books and other media. Research databases can be accessed at the library.

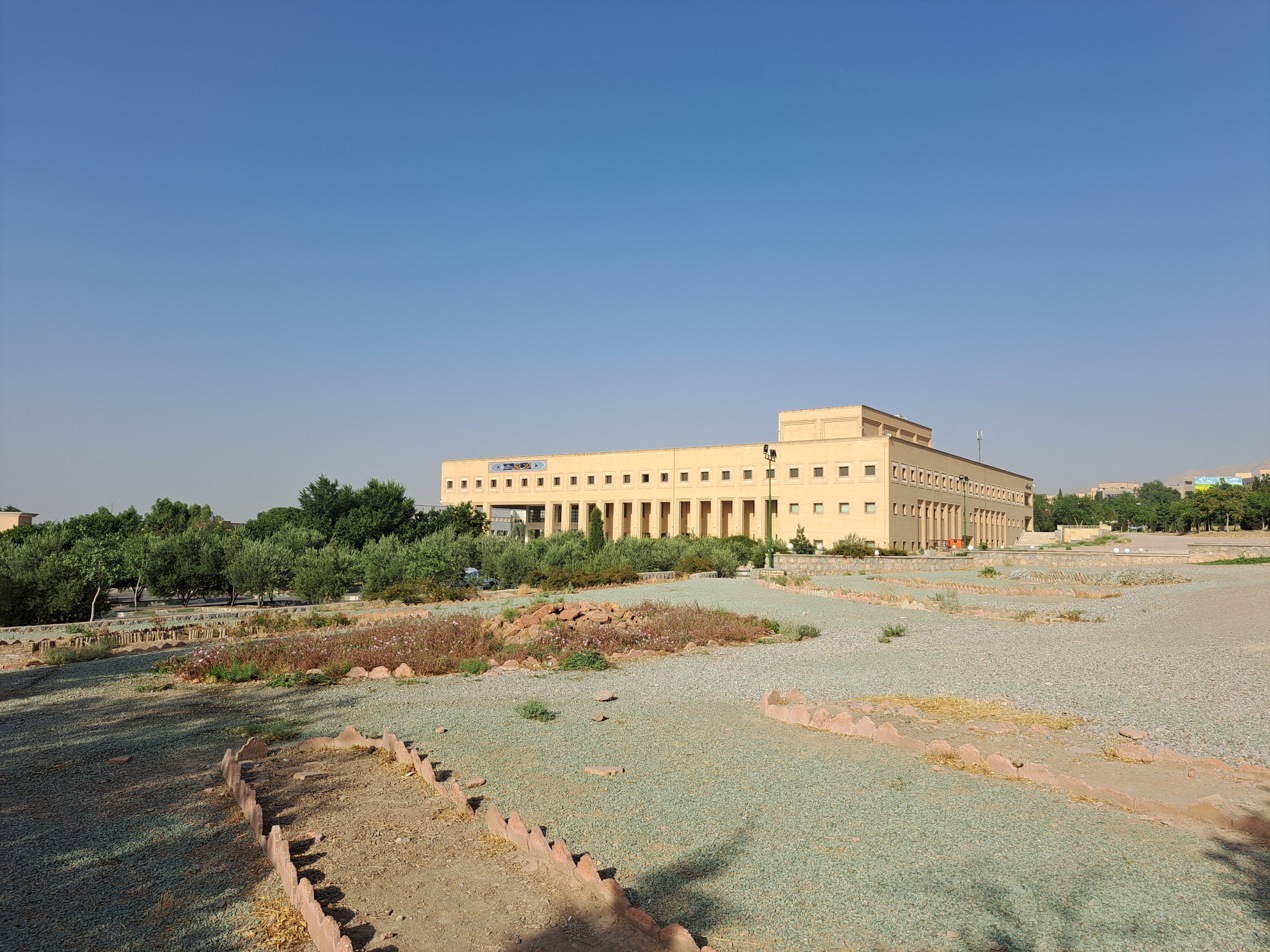
Iut lib
