= Islamic City Council of Shiraz =

Council of Shiraz city

- Local council of Shiraz

Type
- Type: Unicameral
- Term limits: 4 years

History
- Founded: 29 April 1999; 27 years ago
- New session started: 5 August 2021

Leadership
- Chairman
- Vice Chairman
- 1st Secretary
- 2nd Secretary Spokesperson
- Treasurer

Structure
- Seats: 13
- Political groups: Majority; List of Hope (12): ECP (1); NTP (1); NEDA (1); DP (1); IIFJO (1); IATI (1); AIMSI (1); SMMW (1); Minority; Service and Progress (1)
- Authority: Shiraz

Elections
- Voting system: Plurality-at-large voting
- Last election: 18 June 2021

Website
- shorashiraz.ir

The Islamic City Council of Shiraz (Persian: شورای اسلامی شهر شیراز) is the directly elected council that presides over the city of Shiraz and elects the mayor in a mayor–council government system.

== Members ==
#	Member	Bloc	Party	Votes
1	Ahmad-Reza Dastgheib	Reformist	DP	101,118
2	Leyla Doudman	Reformist	ECP	90,130
3	Abdolrazagh Mousavi	Reformist	IATI	78,142
4	Nozar Emami	Reformist	NTP	77,641
5	Sirous Pakfetrat	Conservative	—N/a	75,511
6	Soulmaz Dehghani	Reformist	SMMW	71,628
7	Ebrahim Sabouri	Reformist	NEDA	67,651
8	Navvab Ghaedi	Reformist	—N/a	66,262
9	Ali Nasseri	Reformist	—N/a	64,449
10	Ghassem Moghimi	Reformist	AIMSI	62,389
11	Sina Banizamani	Reformist	—N/a	62,314
12	Mehdi Hajati	Reformist	—N/a	59,054
13	Saeid Nazari	Reformist	IIFJO	54,929
