= Ahmad Shirzad =

Iranian physicist (born 1958)

Member of the Parliament of Iran
- In office 28 May 2000 – 28 May 2004
- Constituency: Isfahan

Personal details
- Born: 1958 (age 67–68)
- Education: Sharif University of Technology (BA, MA, PhD)
- Alma mater: Sharif University of Technology
- Profession: Professor of Physics

Ahmad Shirzad (Persian: احمد شیرزاد) is an Iranian physicist. He was a member of the 6th Iran Parliament (Consultative Assembly of Iran). He also was a member of Islamic Iran Participation Front and an active Iranian politician between 1995 and 2010.

Shirzad is a faculty member of physics department at Isfahan University of Technology. He teaches Analytical Mechanics and Quantum Mechanics. His research field includes High Energy Physics and Mathematical Physics.
