= Mohammad-Hassan Malekmadani =

Iranian politician

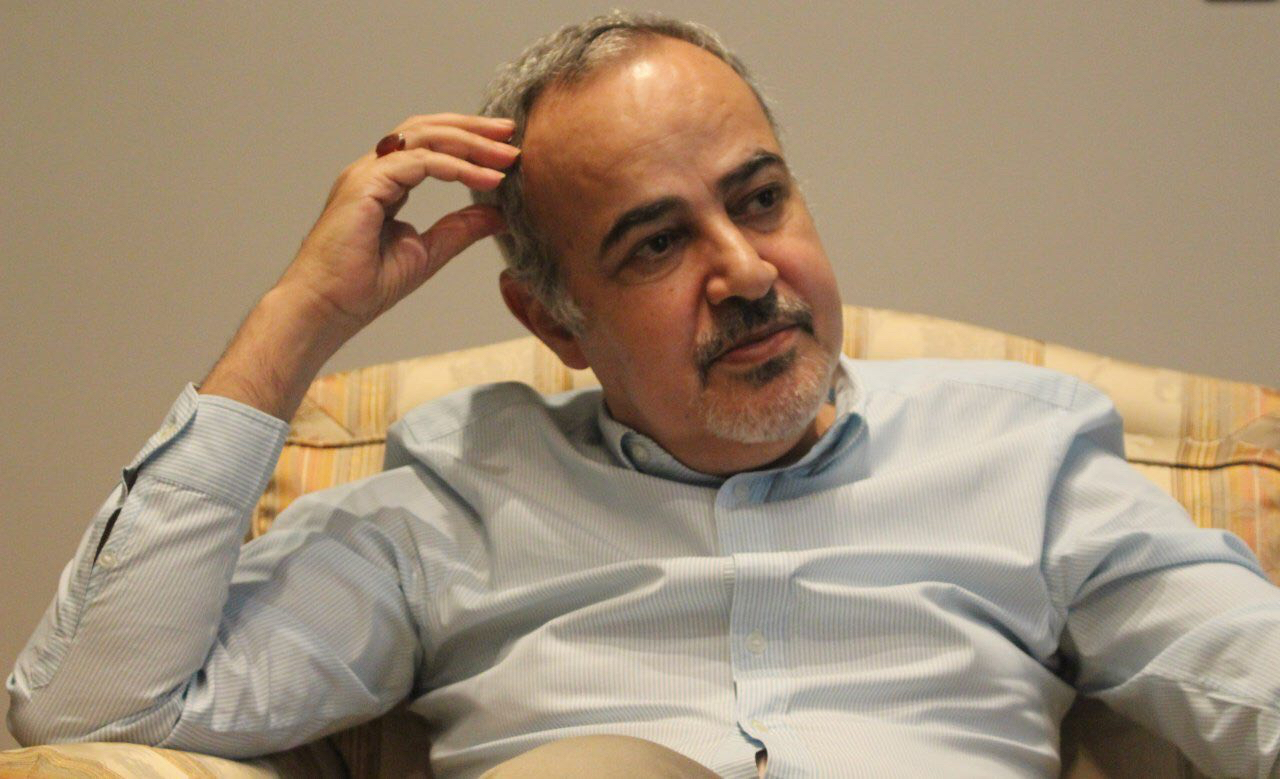

Mayor of Tehran
- In office 4 March 2002 – 20 January 2003
- Preceded by: Mohammad Haghani (Acting)
- Succeeded by: Mohammad-Hossein Moghimi (Acting)

Mayor of Isfahan
- In office 20 November 1983 – 7 June 1990
- Preceded by: Hassan Derakhshandepour
- Succeeded by: Hamidreza Nikkar

Personal details
- Born: January 1955 (age 71)
- Party: Reformist

Mohammad-Hassan Malekmadani (Persian: محمدحسن ملک‌مدنی) is an Iranian politician who served as the mayor in Isfahan and Tehran. He is affiliated with the Reformist Party and the Executives of Construction Party and is recognised for his contributions to cultural and urban development.

== Early life ==
Malekmadani was born on 16 January 1955 in the village of Shurok, located in Meybod County, Yazd Province, Iran. He completed his primary education in Meybod and pursued further studies in Yazd. Prior to the 1979 Iranian Revolution, he was active in agricultural development initiatives in Meybod and was associated with Seyyed Ruhollah Khatami.

Following the 1979 Iranian Revolution, Malekmadani served as the representative of the prosecutor's office in Gonbad-e Kavus from March 1980 to January 1981. He then joined the Kayhan Institute, where he worked as the Deputy for Financial and Administrative Affairs from January 1981 to October 1983. During this period, Seyyed Mohammad Khatami, who later became President of Iran, was the representative of Ayatollah Khomeini at the institute.

== Mayor of Isfahan (1983 - 1990) ==
Malekmadani was appointed as the Mayor of Isfahan on 20 November 1983 and served until 7 June 1990. During his tenure, he initiated several cultural and infrastructural projects, including:

- Establishment of public libraries across the city.
- Creation of cultural centres (Farhangsara) in various districts.
- Development of Ghadir Garden.
- Founding the city's first natural history museum.
- Construction of the Soffeh Mountain Park.
- Establishment of a music conservatory and a puppet theatre hall.
- Initiation of preliminary steps for the Isfahan metro project.

During Malekmadani's tenure as Mayor of Isfahan, a significant urban development initiative was undertaken to transform the banks of the Zayandeh Rud River (c.16 km) into continuous public parklands. This project aimed to enhance urban green spaces and provide residents with accessible recreational areas along the river.

- The initiative involved the acquisition of privately owned lands adjacent to the riverbanks. These lands were systematically purchased by the municipality to create uninterrupted park areas on both sides of the Zayandeh Rud. The development facilitated the establishment of pedestrian pathways and green spaces, allowing citizens to walk from the eastern to the western parts of the city along the river.
- The creation of these linear parks not only provided recreational spaces but also contributed to the environmental and aesthetic enhancement of Isfahan. The project is considered a pioneering example of urban riverfront development in Iran, reflecting a commitment to sustainable urban planning and community well-being.
- The transformation of the Zayandeh Rud riverbanks into public parks remains a notable aspect of Isfahan's urban landscape, illustrating the city's dedication to integrating natural features into its urban fabric.

== Advisory Roles (1990 - 2002) ==
After his tenure in Isfahan, Malekmadani served as an advisor to the Minister of Interior and as a senior advisor to the Mayor of Tehran. During this period, he was involved in urban development projects, notably the transformation of Tehran's slaughterhouse into Bahman Cultural Centre and Park.

== Mayor of Tehran (2002 - 2003) ==
Malekmadani was elected as Mayor of Tehran by the City Council of Tehran on 25 February 2002, and was approved by the Interior Ministry on 3 March. His tenure lasted until 20 January 2003.

During his time as mayor, he implemented several cultural and urban development initiatives:

- Participation in establishing the Tehran Calligraphers Association.
- Construction of Dialogue Park (Park-e Goftogu).
- Inauguration of Worker’s Park (Boostan-e Kargar).
- Acquisition and transformation of the Zamrud-Dorous land into Pāydāri Park.
- Restoration of the Qorakhaneh building.
- Opening of the Shahid Harandi Cultural Complex.
- Purchase of the former Qasr Prison for conversion into a cultural site.

During Mohammad-Hassan Malekmadani's tenure as Mayor of Tehran (2002 - 2003), he prioritised the expansion and modernisation of the city's public transportation system, with a particular focus on the Tehran Metro. Recognising the metro's potential to alleviate traffic congestion and reduce air pollution, Malekmadani advocated for increased investment in the metro infrastructure.

Under his administration, efforts were made to extend existing metro lines and improve service efficiency. However, these initiatives faced challenges due to budgetary constraints and political disagreements within the city council. Malekmadani's push for sustainable urban development, including his stance against the sale of building density permits ("Tarakom Foroushi"). He argued that relying on such sales was unsustainable and detrimental to urban planning. This stance led to tensions with developers and some council members.

In 2003, Malekmadani was sentenced to five months in prison and barred from public office on charges related to corruption. The judiciary stated that he had misused his position to prevent the implementation of legal decisions and had obtained illegal funds. However, in 2005, he was acquitted of all charges by the court, which found insufficient evidence to support the accusations.

Malekmadani's tenure as mayor was marked by his commitment to enhancing Tehran's public transportation infrastructure and promoting sustainable urban planning. Despite facing political and legal challenges, his efforts laid the groundwork for subsequent developments in the city's metro system.

== Private Art Collection ==
Malekmadani has curated a significant private art collection, focusing on religious iconography and Persian calligraphy. Over four decades, he has assembled over 2,000 pieces of "shamayel," depicting Imam Ali and other revered figures in Shia Islam. In December 2017, a selection from this collection was exhibited at the Malek National Museum and Library in Tehran, showcasing works from the Safavid and Qajar eras by artists such as Mehr Ali Sourtgar, Ali Akbar Hojjat, and Esmail Jalayer.

In addition to religious iconography, Malekmadani has amassed an extensive collection of over 1,000 pieces of Persian calligraphy from the Safavi, Qajar, and Pahlavi periods. In December 2019, the National Museum of Iran hosted an exhibition titled "A Few Pens from the Malekmadani Collection," featuring works by renowned calligraphers including Mir Emad Hassani, Mirza Gholamreza Esfahani, Zain al-Abedin Esfahani, Golzar, Esmail Jalayer, and Malek Mohammad Qazvini. The exhibited pieces included Qur'anic verses, poetic excerpts, and religious texts, rendered in scripts such as Naskh, Thuluth, and Nastaliq.

Malekmadani's dedication to preserving and promoting Islamic art through his personal collections underscores his commitment to safeguarding Iran’s cultural and religious heritage. By sharing these works with the public through exhibitions, he contributes to the appreciation and understanding of Iran's rich artistic traditions.

== Legacy ==
Mohammad-Hassan Malekmadani is regarded as one of the early Iranian municipal leaders who introduced long-term planning concepts to city governance. His focus on cultural infrastructure, environmental integration, and public access to services marked a shift in how cities like Isfahan and Tehran approached development during the 1980s and early 2000s.

His decision to stop the sale of building density permits in Tehran led to ongoing national debate about sustainable municipal revenue models and urban congestion. Although his position was controversial at the time, it reflected broader concerns about the long-term effects of unregulated urban growth.

In the area of transport, his support for expanding the Tehran Metro contributed to a shift in public policy toward investment in mass transit. While some of his plans were not fully implemented due to political tensions, they laid the foundation for later metro development.

Malekmadani's later recognition as a collector and promoter of Islamic art and Persian calligraphy has also contributed to his public image beyond politics. His exhibitions have helped increase access to cultural heritage and have been welcomed by art institutions and scholars.

His legacy is associated with reform-minded municipal leadership, support for sustainable development, and efforts to align Iranian city planning with broader cultural and environmental goals.
