= Shahabeddin Tabatabaei =

Iranian politician and journalist

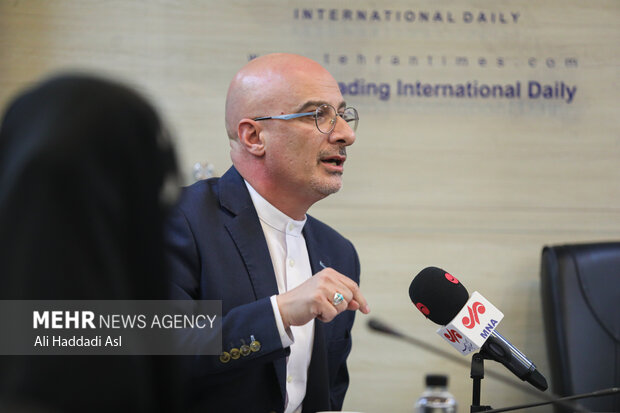
- Born: Tehran
- Occupation: Secretary general of the NEDA Party
- Political party: NEDA Party

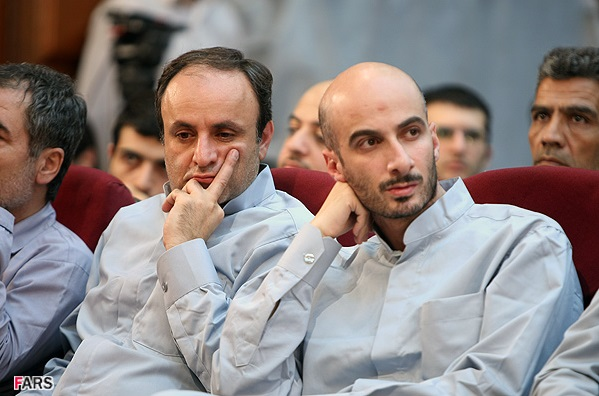
Iranian British embassy employee Hossein Rassam (L) and Shahabeddin Tabatabaei (R), head of the youth department at Iran's Islamic Participation Front, attend a trial hearing at the revolutionary court in Tehran

Shahabeddin Tabatabaei (Persian: شهاب الدین طباطبایی) is an Iranian politician, author, journalist, reformist, head of the youth department at Iran's Islamic Participation Front, and the Secretary general of the Iranian Neda Party.

He was the director of the youth committee for Mir-Hossein Mousavi in the 10th presidential election of Iran and was arrested during the protests that followed the 10th presidential election of Iran in 2009.

== 2009 Iranian presidential election protests ==
Tabatabaei was the director of the youth committee for Mir-Hossein Mousavi during the election. When Iranian authorities blocked Facebook during the election campaign he said:

Every single media outlet that is seen as competition for Ahmadinejad is at risk of being closed.

and called it "a swift reaction" to a major pro-Mousavi rally in a Tehran sports stadium which included an appearance by former reformist president Mohammad Khatami and many young people.

Tabatabaei was arrested on 4 June 2009, five days after the election, among many other famous Iranian reformists after the 10th presidential election of Iran. On 17 October 2009, the court sentenced Shahab Tabatabai to five years in prison for "acting against national security. As the Human Rights Watch report, he among other reformist politicians, intellectuals, journalists, clerics, and student leaders has been put on trial before courts that do not meet international fair trial standards. They had been held for months without access to lawyers, much of that time in solitary confinement. The authorities assigned them lawyers at their trials, but there was no time to prepare their defense and the court-appointed lawyers did not represent them properly.

On 24 October 2009, Iranian authorities detained 35 relatives and supporters of jailed reformists, including wives and children at the prayer ceremony to pay respect to them at the residence of reformist Shahab Tabatabai's father-in-law.

Tehran prosecutors refused to free them on bail.

== Writing and media activities ==
Shahabaddin Tabatabaei started writing at the age of 26.

Some of his works include:

Advice to Kings (Nasīḥat al-Mulūk):

This is a treatise containing advice and suggestions by Saadi Shirazi to the ruler of his time. Tabatabaei wrote this book during his imprisonment in Evin Prison. It was published by the Nazar Cultural and Research Institute in August 2013.

Friday Prayers in the City of Hope (Namāz-e Jom'eh-ye Shahr-e Omid):

Since February 2022, Tabatabaei has been writing a fictional Friday prayer sermon in the first page of the Shargh newspaper. The sermon is delivered by an imaginary person named Hojjat al-Islam Monsef in a city called the City of Hope. The sermons address the real problems of Iran and the people. Tabatabaei has said that he considers the character of Hojjat al-Islam Monsef to be similar to that of Mahmoud Taleghani, the first Friday prayer leader of Tehran. The 40th and last sermon in this series, entitled "We Are Responsible for the Good Life of the People, Not for Interfering in Their Lives," was published on July 2, 2023.

The Crow's Friend (Rafiq-e Kalāgh):

This is a collection of short stories published by Nashr-e Shargh in the winter of 2022. In the preface to the book, the author makes it clear that life does not go according to plan, not only in Iran but also in Iranian stories. This feeling of anxiety, fear, and the collapse of happy moments shows that everything is unstable in Iran.

The cover design is by Hadi Heydari.

Tabatabaei dedicated this book to his eight-year-old son, when he wrote to him about the lovability of crows.

== Neda Party ==
Neda Party launched in 2014 to contest legislative elections due in March 2016. Mohammad Sadegh Kharrazi, a former ambassador to France and representative to the United Nations as well as adviser to reformist ex-president Mohammad Khatami, was listed among leaders of the party, which also names Shahab Tabatabaei, a nephew of Khatami, in its ranks.

He is the Secretary general of Iranian Neda Party since 2022.
