= Fatemeh Haghighatjoo =

Iranian Reformist politician, activist, and women's studies professor

Member of the Parliament of Iran
- In office 26 May 2000 – 23 February 2004
- Constituency: Tehran, Rey, Shemiranat and Eslamshahr
- Majority: 988,564 (33.72%)

Personal details
- Born: 29 December 1968 (age 57) Tehran, Iran
- Party: Islamic Iran Participation Front
- Spouse: Mohammad Tahavori (m. 2001; div. 2015)
- Children: 1
- Education: University of Tehran (BA); Tarbiat Modarres University (PhD)
- Occupation: Scholar
- Profession: Counselor

Fatemeh Haghighatjoo (also spelled Haghighatjou and Haqiqatju; Persian: فاطمه حقیقت‌جو, lit. 'Truth/Justice Seeker') is an Iranian scholar and reformist politician who represented Tehran, Rey, Shemiranat and Eslamshahr in the Iranian Parliament from 2000 to 2004.

She left Iran in 2005. She resides in the United States, where she is the CEO and co-founder of the 501(c)(3) organization Nonviolent Initiative for Democracy (NID).

== Early life and education ==
Haghighatjoo was born in 1968 in southern Tehran, the second of four daughters, and comes from a traditionalist middle-class family. She lost her father in an accident when she was 6, and was brought up by her mother as a practising Muslim. She attended University of Tehran and Tarbiat Modarres University, gaining a degree in psychology and holding a Ph.D. in family counseling. She was a student activist with the prodemocracy Office for Strengthening Unity.

== Political career ==
Haghighatjoo worked for Mohammad Khatami's presidential campaign, and joined the reformist Mosharekat party as a student leader. In 2000, she successfully ran for a seat in the Iranian Parliament and became the youngest female deputy.

An advocate of women's rights, reforms and democracy, she contributed proposing a bill to join Convention on the Elimination of All Forms of Discrimination Against Women. She was charged with Tahrif of the words of Ayatollah Khomeini and insulting Ali Khamenei in 2001 for what she said in a speech in Qazvin, eventually convicted of the latter charge and sentenced to ten months suspended imprisonment.

On 23 February 2004, she resigned from the parliament on the grounds that she was no longer able to keep her oath of office, and as a sign of protest to "the incorrect, illegal and non-religious conduct of the appointed bodies [e.g. the Guardian Council and Judiciary] in recent years".

== Professional career ==
Haghighatjoo was a math teacher and then a counselor in a girls' high school, before being employed as a lecturer at the University of Tehran and Shahid Beheshti University. She is also a former faculty member at the University of Massachusetts, Boston, and the University of Connecticut and has had fellowship positions at the Kennedy School of Harvard University and Massachusetts Institute of Technology's Center for International Studies.

== Views ==
She self-identifies as feminist. She told The Boston Globe in 2009 that she entered Parliament believing Islam and democracy could coexist; she left office believing in “separation of mosque and state.’’

== Personal life ==
Haghighatjoo married a parliamentary correspondent, when she was 31 and in her second year as a lawmaker. In August 2003, she gave birth to a girl, Sara Tahavori.

== See also ==
- List of Muslim feminists

Party political offices
New title Party established	Chairperson of Islamic Iran Participation Front's Youth Wing; 1998–2000	Succeeded by Majid Farahani
