= NEDA Party =

Nedaye Iranian Party حزب ندای ایرانیان
- Abbreviation: NEDA
- Secretary-General: Shahabeddin Tabatabaei
- Founder: Sadegh Kharazi
- Legalized: 1 December 2014; 11 years ago
- Membership (2015): 2,300
- Ideology: Reformism; Social democracy
- Political position: Centre-left
- Colors: Turqouise; Blue; Brown
- Parliament: 0 / 290
- Tehran City Council: 0 / 21
- Mashhad City Council: 0 / 15
- Isfahan City Council: 0 / 13
- Shiraz City Council: 0 / 13

Website
- irneda.ir

Nedaye Iranian Party (Persian: حزب ندای ایرانیان, romanized: Hezb-e Nuday-e 'Iranian, lit. 'Voice of Iranians Party'), also known by the acronym NEDA (from Persian: نسل دوم اصلاحات, romanized: Nasl-e Dovom-e Eslahat, lit. 'Second Generation of Reforms'), is a reformist and social democratic political party in Iran. The party held its first congress in 2015.

It was the first party that emerged after the reformist crackdown during 2009 Iranian presidential election protests, followed by the Union of Islamic Iran People Party. The majority of members belong to the youth wing of the banned Islamic Iran Participation Front and are in their early 30s.

The party was in coalition with the Pervasive Coalition of Reformists during the 2016 Iranian legislative election.

== Party leaders ==
Secretaries-General
Name	Tenure	Ref
Majid Farahani	2014–2017	
Sadegh Kharazi	2017–2022	
Shahabeddin Tabatabaei	2022–	

Heads of Central Council
Name	Tenure	Ref
Sadegh Kharazi	2014–2017	
Majid Farahani	2017–	
