= Morteza Saghaeiannejad =

Iranian academic professor (b. 1952)

Seyyed Morteza Saghaeiannejad
- مرتضی سقاییان‌نژاد
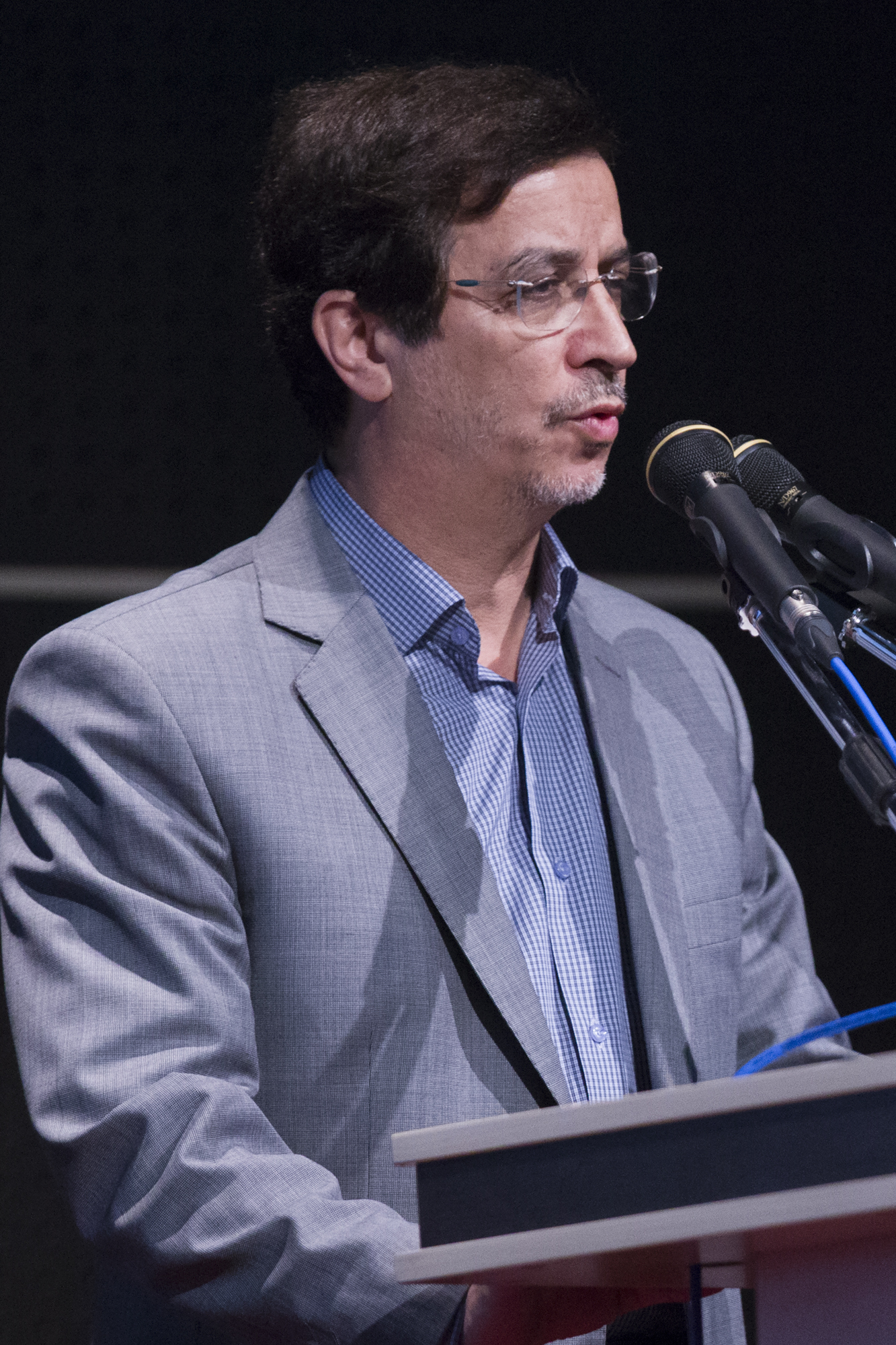

Mayor of Qom
- In office 3 June 2014 – 21 April 2025
- Preceded by: Mohammad Delbari
- Succeeded by: Faramarz Azimi

Mayor of Isfahan
- In office May 2003 – 30 May 2015
- Preceded by: Hossein Shahramnia
- Succeeded by: Mehdi Jamali Nejad

Personal details
- Born: Seyyed Morteza Saghaeiannejad Esfahani; January 1952 (age 74) Isfahan, Imperial State of Iran
- Party: Islamic Society of Engineers
- Education: University of Colorado Boulder; University of Kentucky
- Profession: Electrical engineer
- Website: saghaeian.ir

Morteza Saghaeiannejad (Persian: مرتضی سقاییان‌نژاد; born January 1952), also Saghayannezhad, is an Iranian academic professor. He currently serves as Electrical Engineering professor at Isfahan University of Technology in his hometown Isfahan.

Academic offices
Preceded by Mohammad Shahedi	Chancellor of the Esfahan University of Technology; 1989–1997	Succeeded by Ali Ahoonmanesh
Preceded by Akbar Shah Mohammadi	Chancellor of the University of Esfahan; 1982–1985	Succeeded by Hassan Razmjou
Civic offices
Preceded by Mohammad Delbari	Mayor of Qom; 2015–2025	Succeeded by Faramarz Azimi
Preceded by Hossein Shahramnia	Mayor of Esfahan; 2003–2015	Succeeded by Mehdi Jamalinejad
Party political offices
Vacant Unknown	Secretary of Society of Engineers in Esfahan Province; Unknown–2015	Succeeded by Rasoul Hamedian
