= Sadegh Kharazi =

Iranian diplomat

Seyyed Sadegh Kharazi
- صادق خرازی
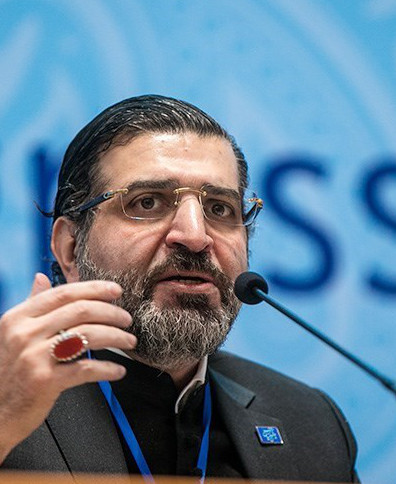
- Kharazi in 2016

Ambassador of Iran to France
- In office 2002–2006
- President: Mohammad Khatami; Mahmoud Ahmadinejad
- Preceded by: Alireza Moayyeri
- Succeeded by: Ali Ahani

Personal details
- Born: Mohammad Sadegh Kharazi; 2 March 1963 (age 63) Tehran, Iran
- Party: NEDA Party
- Parents: Mohsen Kharazi (father); Mohammad Bagher Kharazi (brother)
- Website: www.kharazi.ir

Mohammad Sadegh Kharazi (Persian: محمدصادق خرازی; born 2 March 1963) is a former Iranian diplomat and advisor to Iran's former President Khatami.

Kharazi started his career in 1983 during the Iran–Iraq War in the High Defence Council and the IRIB. He subsequently became Iran's ambassador to the United Nations in 1989, and after a period of six years he returned to Iran as Deputy Foreign Minister for Research. He became Iran's Ambassador to France in 2002 until 2006 when Mahmoud Ahmadinejad was elected into office. Kharazi was the chairman of the 1997 Tehran OIC Summit. He was also a key figure in the two-year nuclear negotiations with the EU trio.

Kharazi has a keen interest in calligraphic and historical manuscripts and is an avid collector of such items. He is a member of the board of several Iranian cultural, educational and research centers, including Tehran University, the Cultural Heritage Organization of Iran, and the National Library of Iran.

Currently, Kharazi works closely with Mohammad Khatami on the issue of dialogue among civilizations and is his senior advisor. He co-founded the 'Encyclopedia of Contemporary Islam', which researches Iran's cultural and political movements and schools of thought in the past two centuries. Additionally, he is the founder and editor of the Iranian Diplomacy website, the Iranian Economy website, and the Heritage of Iran and Islam website.

Kharazi was a "close friend" of Qasem Soleimani. As ambassador, he often wore a tie, contrary to most of his Iranian colleagues.

Party political offices
Preceded by Majid Farahani	Secretary-General of NEDA Party; 2017–present	Incumbent
New title Party established	Head of Central Council of NEDA Party; 2014–2017	Succeeded by Majid Farahani
