= Majid Farahani =

Iranian reformist politician

- مجید فراهانی

Member of City Council of Tehran
- In office 23 August 2017 – 4 August 2021

Personal details
- Party: NEDA
- Other political affiliations: Islamic Iran Participation Front

Majid Farahani (Persian: مجید فراهانی) is an Iranian reformist politician who is member of the City Council of Tehran. Farahani was formerly secretary general of the NEDA Party and head of Islamic Iran Participation Front's youth wing.

Party political offices
Preceded by Sadegh Kharazi	Head of Central Council of NEDA Party; 2017–present	Incumbent
New title Party established	Secretary-General of NEDA Party; 2014–2017	Succeeded by Sadegh Kharazi
Preceded by Fatemeh Haghighatjoo	Chairman of Islamic Iran Participation Front's Youth Wing; 2000–2004	Succeeded by Reza Sharifi
