= Saeed Toosi =

Iranian Qur'an reciter (b. 1970)

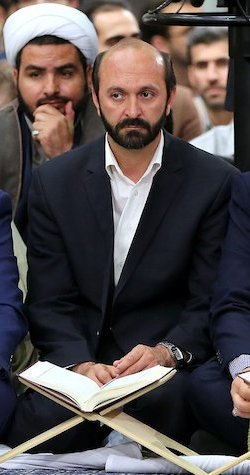
- Toosi in 2016
- Born: Muhammed Gandomnejad Toosi; 1970 (age 55–56); Mashhad, Imperial State of Iran
- Occupation: Qāriʾ
- Criminal charges: Lavat; Child sexual abuse
- Criminal penalty: 4 years in prison (court of first instance)
- Criminal status: Acquitted (appellate court)

Saeed Toosi (Persian: سعید طوسی, romanized: Saʿīd Tusi) is an Iranian barber, Quran reciter and teacher. He is winner of the several first prizes in both local and international competitions, notably the 1998 International Quran Recital Competition.

Toosi has been referred to as Ali Khamenei's "favourite Qu'ranic reciter". In 2016, Toosi was accused of "sexually abusing underage trainees", which was considered the first case of its kind in Iran.

== Child sexual abuse lawsuit ==
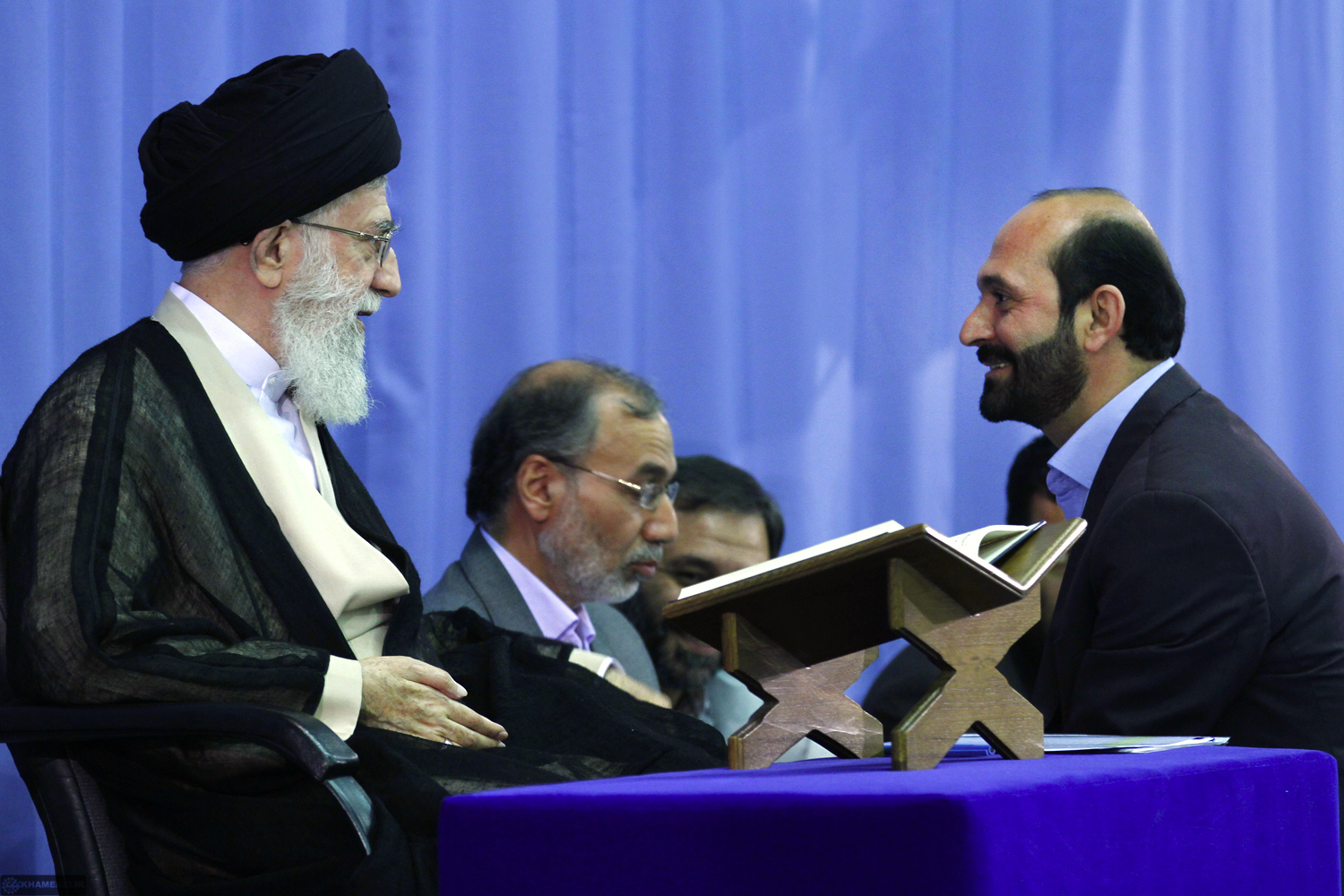
Ali Khamenei and Saeed Toosi

In October 2016, VOA-PNN shed light on Toosi's case in which he was accused of sexually abusing nineteen of his prepubescent Qur'an students over the past years (four plaintiffs are confirmed). It is unknown whether the charges could include homosexual rape, which could carry the death penalty.

According to the reports, senior members of the Iranian government, including Ali Khamenei, had attempted to "cover up the scandal for four years when the victims and their families filed complaints with the judiciary." Also journalists were warned not to publicize the investigation.

The anonymous plaintiffs claim that complaints made through legal channels were covered up or ignored by the authorities in order to protect the reputation of the Iranian government.

Toosi issued a denial statement rejecting all of the claims, which he called “total lies”. The allegations were "aimed at discrediting the state’s religious foundations and its supreme leader, Ali Khamenei," Toosi said. He stated he had never engaged in "such sins" and "actions incompatible with chastity."

In 2018, Tehran's court acquitted Toosi of charges concerning "sexually molesting and raping four of the victims who filed complaints with the judiciary against him"; stating that “even if it is proved that the defendant has committed the act, it does not mean that he has committed a crime for which the law and the judiciary will be held accountable”.
