= Ghodratollah Norouzi =

Iranian politician

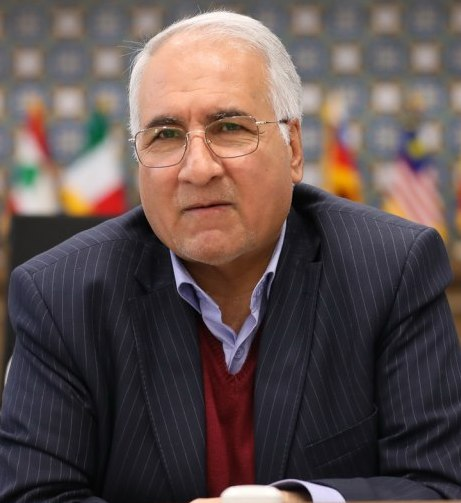

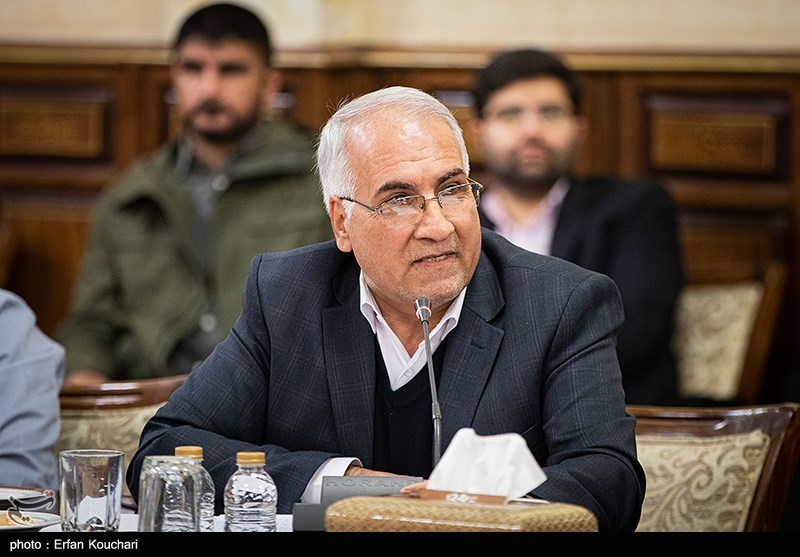
Ghodratollah Norouzi

Ghodratollah Norouzi Persian: قدرت‌الله نوروزی is an Iranian politician, the former governor of Isfahan county, and former mayor of Isfahan city from 2017 to 2021. He has a doctorate of law. He is a party member of Islamic Iran Freedom and Justice Organization.
