= Islamic City Council of Isfahan =

- Local council of Isfahan

Type
- Type: Unicameral
- Term limits: 4 years

History
- Founded: 29 April 1999; 27 years ago
- New session started: 5 August 2021

Leadership
- Chairman
- Vice Chairman
- 1st Secretary
- 2nd Secretary Spokesperson
- Treasurer

Structure
- Seats: 13
- Political groups: List of Hope (13): IIFJO (2); DP (2); NTP (1); AFIL (1); IATI (1); WH (1); OIF (1); NEDA (1); ARW (1)
- Authority: Isfahan

Elections
- Voting system: Plurality-at-large voting
- Last election: 18 June 2021

Website
- council.isfahan.ir

The Islamic City Council of Isfahan (Persian: شورای اسلامی شهر اصفهان) is the directly elected council that presides over the city of Isfahan and elects the Mayor of Isfahan in a mayor–council government system.

== Committee ==
1. Youth, women, family commission
2. Economic, Legal, investment and tourism commission
3. Special water and deprived districts commission
4. Monitoring, legal, programs, analysis and assessment commission
5. City transit, Information Technology and Smartification commission
6. Cultural societal and sport commission
7. Construction, engineering, and citybuilding commission
8. Health, environment wellbeing and public services commission
9. Supervision Committee
10. Budgetary Integration Commissions

== Research center ==
Research center began in 2011, to support the council in three things policymaking, programming, and to keep watch over the council. It holds regular specialized council meetings, hosts educational conferences and workshops, provides databases, statistics, surveys & census and for the city council . It provides prioritization of council's tasks and gives counsel. It is run by an experts faculty of humanities and sociologists doctors and legal team.

== Members ==
#	Member	Bloc	Party	Votes
1	Alireza Nasr Esfahani	Reformist	IATI	157,280
2	Fathollah Moein Najafabadi	Reformist	—N/a	151,082
3	Abbasali Javadi	Reformist	AFIL	142,950
4	Shirin Toghyani Khorasgani	Reformist	—N/a	142,779
5	Kourosh Khosravi Darani	Reformist	IIFJO	141,671
6	Farideh Roshan	Reformist	ARW	136,444
7	Asghar Barshan	Reformist	WH	136,227
8	Pourmohammad Shariatinia	Reformist	NTP	132,108
9	Kourosh Mohammadi	Reformist	DP	131,997
10	Ahmad Zandavar	Reformist	DP	131,307
11	Mehdi Mazrouei Seyyedani	Reformist	NEDA	130,261
12	Nasir Mellat	Reformist	OIF	129,844
13	Mehdi Moghaddari	Reformist	IIFJO	124,403
