= Municipalities and Village Administrations Organization (Iran) =

Governmental organization of Iran

Iran's Municipalities and Village Administrations Organization (IMO) is a governmental organization in Iran, under the Ministry of Interior (Iran) and responsible for affairs of all municipalities around the country. The head of the IMO is one of the Ministry of Interior vice president.

== Responsibility ==
The planning and budgeting of the city and village local authorities are all addressed by IMO and this organization is believed to be the largest administration body in Iran with almost 980,000 billion Rial cash fund in the year 1400 in Persian calendar (2021–2022) equal to 3.4 of the country's annual budget.
