= Isfahan University of Technology =

University in Iran

Coordinates: 32.718°N 51.532°E

- دانشگاه صنعتی اصفهان Dāneshgāh-e San'ati-ye Esfahān
- Type: Public
- Established: 1977
- Endowment: US$ 20 million
- President: Dr. Sayyed Zafarollah Kalantari
- Faculty: 606
- Students: 11000
- Undergraduates: 5057
- Postgraduates: 4693
- Location: Isfahan, Isfahan, Iran
- Campus: Urban
- Athletics: One main stadium, soccer field, indoor swimming pool, three outdoor tennis fields, outdoor horse riding field, five indoor special purpose gyms
- Website: http://www.iut.ac.ir/en/

The Isfahan University of Technology (IUT) (Note: Persian: دانشگاه صنعتی اصفهان, Dāneshgāh-e San'ati-ye Esfahān.) is a leading public university located in Isfahan, Iran. The university comprises 14 faculties and departments, serving approximately 11,000 students and employing 600 academic staff members. IUT offers undergraduate, graduate, and doctoral programs across four main disciplines: engineering, basic sciences, agriculture, and natural resources. Notably, IUT was the first Iranian university to gain membership in CERN. It was established in 1974 with assistance from the Massachusetts Institute of Technology. Before its establishment, 60 top Iranian students received royal scholarships to pursue their PhD in the top 10 U.S. universities as part of preparation of faculty workforce.

== Overview ==
Isfahan University of Technology started its academic activities in 1977. It is located in the central part of the country with a total area of 2300 hectares. Of this, 400 ha area has been dedicated to the main campus. The main campus resembling a small town, includes all the educational or research building as well as modern dormitories to house more than 5000 students and the residential quarters which provide the academic staff with semi-detached houses. To facilitate for students and staff, IUT also offers the health service center, shopping, sports and recreation centers inside the campus. IUT comprises a College of Agriculture (with ten departments), nine Engineering departments, three basic science departments, one department of natural resources with three divisions, seven research centers, and many research groups. Since it is located at the heart of industrial complexes, it has provided an opportunity to strengthen industrial enhancement of the city of Isfahan and Iran. The university has been successful enough to make strong ties with industries and carried out about 2000 research projects with different national industrial bodies. In terms of technology we have the honor to be the initiator of Isfahan Science and Technology Town (ISTT) which is one of the top in the Middle East. The connection between IUT and ISTT is leading to the enhancement of the cooperation between IUT and Industrial bodies in the region for more research projects, defining curriculum based on the industrial needs, providing the opportunities for students to get experienced about solving real problems based on the needs of society, such as training programs for educating our students and graduates to become entrepreneurs.

== History ==
The university was founded in 1974 and admitted its first students in 1977. It was founded as Aryamehr University of Technology Isfahan branch, with a significant gift of approximately 2 million square meters or 500 acres of land being contributed to the university by the locally notable and well regarded Boroumand family (brothers Abdolghaffar, Abdolrahman, Abdolrahim, Abdolkarim, Abdolrashid, and Abdollah); the university was renamed after the Islamic Revolution of Iran. Plans to make the institution the largest university in the Middle East were not achieved because of political changes in the country.

Isfahan University of Technology is a state university under the supervision of the Ministry of Science, Research, and Technology. IUT began its academic activities in 1977 with around 800 students in five departments; the enrollment has grown to 10,000 in fourteen departments.

The university was designed and planned based on models of MIT and University of Illinois at Chicago Circle (UICC) which is now known as UIC.

== Academics ==
The university runs two research centers, the Information & Communication Technology Institute, and the Subsea Research & Development Center, where the first national radar project and design, and implementation of the first Iranian submarine were carried out.

== World rankings ==
University rankings

Global – Overall
- ARWU World: 801-900 (2019)
- QS World: =571 (2026)

Regional – Overall
- QS Asia: =197 (2025)

Islamic World Science Citation Center (ISC)

The Islamic World Science Citation Center (ISC) published rankings for 2018 of Iranian universities and institutes of higher education appears as follows (after Amirkabir University of Technology and before Iran University of Science and Technology):

1. University of Tehran
2. Sharif University of Technology
3. Amirkabir University of Technology
4. Isfahan University of Technology
5. Iran University of Science and Technology
6. Tarbiat Modarres University
7. Shiraz University
8. Ferdowsi University of Mashhad
9. K. N. Toosi University of Technology
10. University of Tabriz

Academic Ranking of World Universities

- 2011-2015: Not mentioned

Times Higher Education

In 2024–2025, IUT's general national rank was 12, and its rank in Asia was 133. According to subject categories of the Times Higher Education 2020, IUT is:

- Ranked first in the country for Agricultural, Forestry, Environmental and Marine Sciences fields;
- Ranked 2nd in the country for life sciences;
- Ranked 3rd in the country for International Outlook and Industry Income
- Ranked 4th in the list of 40 Iranian Universities

U.S. News

- 2016: National rank: 3, international rank: 547
- 2015: National rank: 3, international rank: 472

Round University Ranking (RUR)

According to the last ranking announced by Round University Ranking (RUR), Isfahan University of Technology (IUT) has been ranked as the first Iranian University in Research and International Diversity. IUT also ranked 3rd in overall ranking between 11 Iranian universities which ranked by RUR.

== Research and facilities ==
Isfahan University of Technology was appointed as a Center of Excellence by Iran's Ministry of Science and Technology in the fields of Risk Management and Natural Hazards, Nano Technology in Environment, Steel Technology, Algebra Science, Sensor and Green Chemistry, Soil & Water Pollution, and Oil-seed Crops.

== Notable alumni ==
- Mohammad-Reza Aref is an Iranian academic, electrical engineer and politician. He was the vice president of Iran under President Mohammad Khatami. He received a bachelor's degree in electronics engineering from University of Tehran and Masters and Ph.D. degrees in electrical and communication engineering from Stanford University in 1975, 1976 and 1980, respectively. Until 1994, Aref was a faculty member of Isfahan University of Technology.
- Mohammad-Ali Najafi is an Iranian politician and retired university professor in mathematics. He received a masters degree at the Massachusetts Institute of Technology. He was a minister and later vice-president for planning and budget; he was a member of Tehran City Council from 2007 to 2013 and was nominated to the Ministry of Education. After the Iranian revolution of 1979, Najafi returned to Iran. He started working as a consultant to Mostafa Chamran and was later the president of Isfahan University of Technology (1980–1981). He was the Mayor of Tehran for eight months, until April 2018. In 2019, Najafi murdered one of his two wives.
- Esfandiar Rahim Mashaei is an Iranian politician. He was an adviser to the former Iranian president Mahmoud Ahmadinejad and his chief of staff. He was appointed on 31 December 2007 to run the newly founded National Center for Research on Globalization. He is a former head of the Cultural Heritage Organization of Iran. Esfandiar Rahim Mashaei was Vice President of Iran for a short time. He studied electrical engineering and holds a bachelor's degree from Isfahan University of Technology.
- Hamid Baqai is an Iranian politician who has been the head of presidential center from 9 April 2011 to 4 August 2013. He was a senior advisor to President Mahmoud Ahmadinejad. He holds a bachelor's degree in Information Technology from Isfahan University of Technology.
- Mohammad Tabibian is an Iranian economist who served under the administration of Akbar Hashemi Rafsanjani as deputy director of the Planning and Budget Organization. Tabibian was head of the groups who made the First Five Year Plan (1989–1993) and the Second Five Year Plan of Iran (1994–1998). He has taught at the Isfahan University of Technology.
- Ahmad Shirzad was a reformist member of the 6th Iran Parliament (Consultative Assembly of Iran) and a leading official in the Islamic Iran Participation Front, the main reformist party in Iran. He teaches physics in Isfahan University of Technology.
- Amir Faghri is an American professor and leader in the engineering profession as an educator, scientist, and administrator. He is currently Distinguished Professor of Engineering and Distinguished Dean Emeritus of Engineering at the University of Connecticut. Faghri served as head of the Mechanical Engineering Department 1994–1998 and dean of the School of Engineering at the University of Connecticut from 1998 to 2006. He is arguably the world's leading expert in the area of heat pipes and a significant contributor to thermal-fluids engineering in thermal energy systems. He was one of the founding faculty members and administrators who established Isfahan University of Technology in 1977.

== Departments ==
- Agriculture
- Chemical Engineering
- Chemistry
- Civil Engineering
- Electrical and Computer Engineering
- English Language
- Industrial Engineering
- Materials Engineering
- Mathematics
- Mechanical Engineering
- Mining Engineering
- Natural Resources
- Physical Education
- Physics
- Textile Engineering
- Golpayegan College of Engineering
- Transportation Engineering

== Affiliated research centers ==
- Center for Advanced Computing Services
- Center for Research in Applied Statistics and Stochastic Systems
- Information & Communication Technology Institute
- Network Security Center
- Research Center for soil-less cultivation
- Steel Research Center
- Under Water Research Center

== Former Presidents ==
Name	Dates of office	Alma mater	Field
Dr. Mohammad Amin	1974 – 1979		
Dr. Mohammad Reza Saiedi	1979		Chemistry
Dr. Seied Hossein Taheri	1979 – 1980		
Mr. Mohammad-Ali Najafi	1980 – 1981	(United States) MIT	Mathematics
Prof. Mohammad Mehdi Saadatpour	1981 – 1983	(United States) University of California, Berkeley	Civil Engineering
Prof. Ahmad Abrishamchi	1983 – 1986	(United States) University of California, Davis	Water Resources Engineering
Prof. Mohammad Shahedi	1986 – 1989	(United States) Purdue University	Agriculture
Prof. Seied Morteza Saghaian Nezhad	1989 – 1997	(United States) University of Kentucky	Electrical Engineering
Prof. Ali Ahoonmanesh	1997 – 2003	(United States) University of California, Davis	Plant Pathology
Prof. Mohammad Hasan Abbasi	2003 – 2005	(United States) University of California, Berkeley	Materials Processing
Prof. Gholam Reza Ghorbani	2005 – 2009	(United States) University of Kentucky	Agriculture
Prof. Mohammad Esmail Hamedani Golshan	2009 – 2013	(Iran) Isfahan University of Technology	Electrical Engineering
Prof. Mahmoud Modarres-Hashemi	2013 – 2019	(Iran) Sharif University of Technology	Electrical Engineering
Prof. Sayyed Mahdi Abtahi	2019 – 2021	Iran University of Science and Technology	Civil Engineering
Prof. Ali Mohammad Mirmohammadi Meybodi	2021 – 2025	(United Kingdom) University of London	Agriculture, Plant Breeding
Prof. Sayyed Mahdi Abtahi (acting)	2025	Iran University of Science and Technology	Civil Engineering
Prof. Sayyed Zafarollah Kalantari	2025 – present	(Iran) Shiraz University	Physics

== Gallery ==
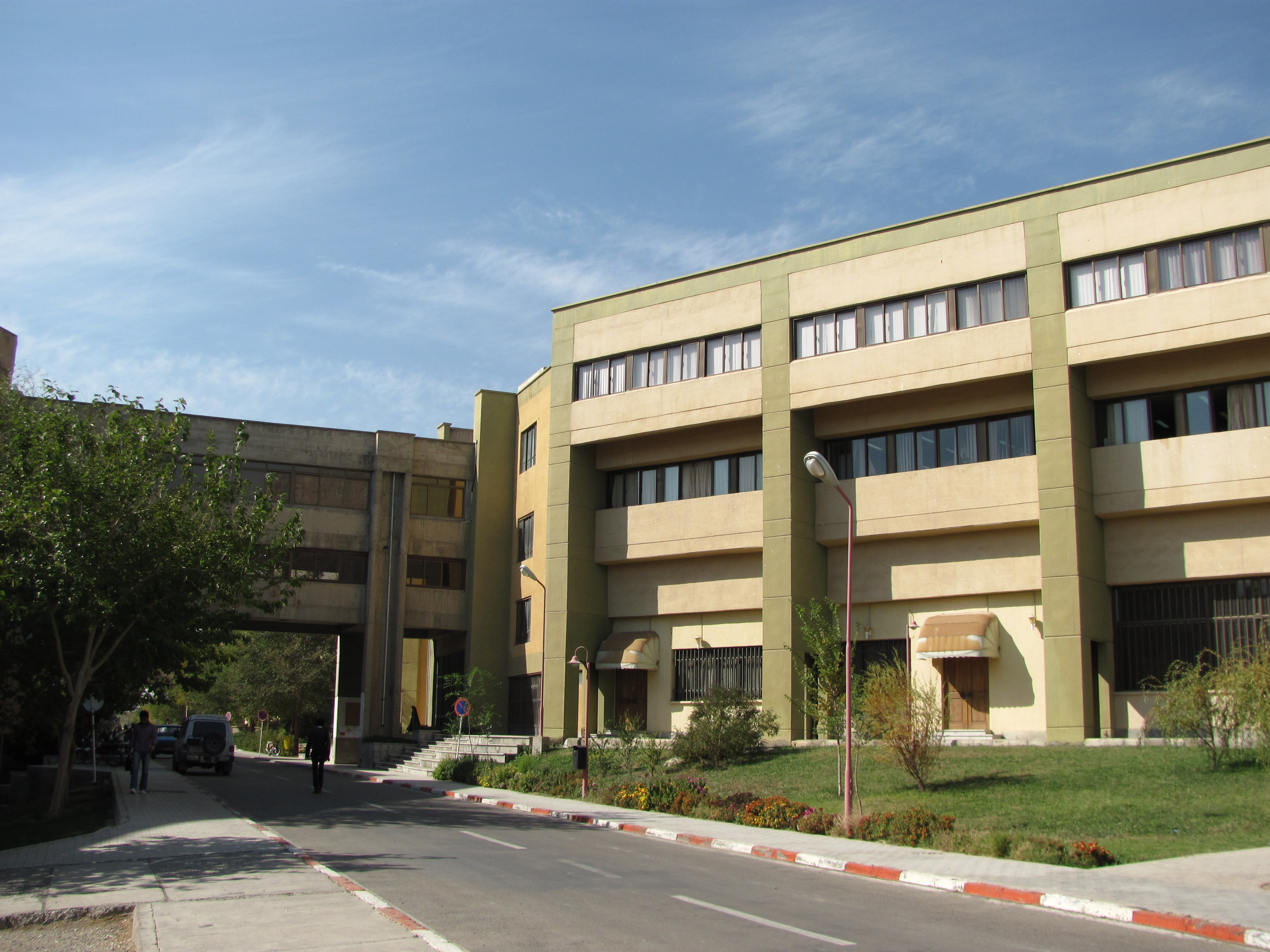
College of Agriculture

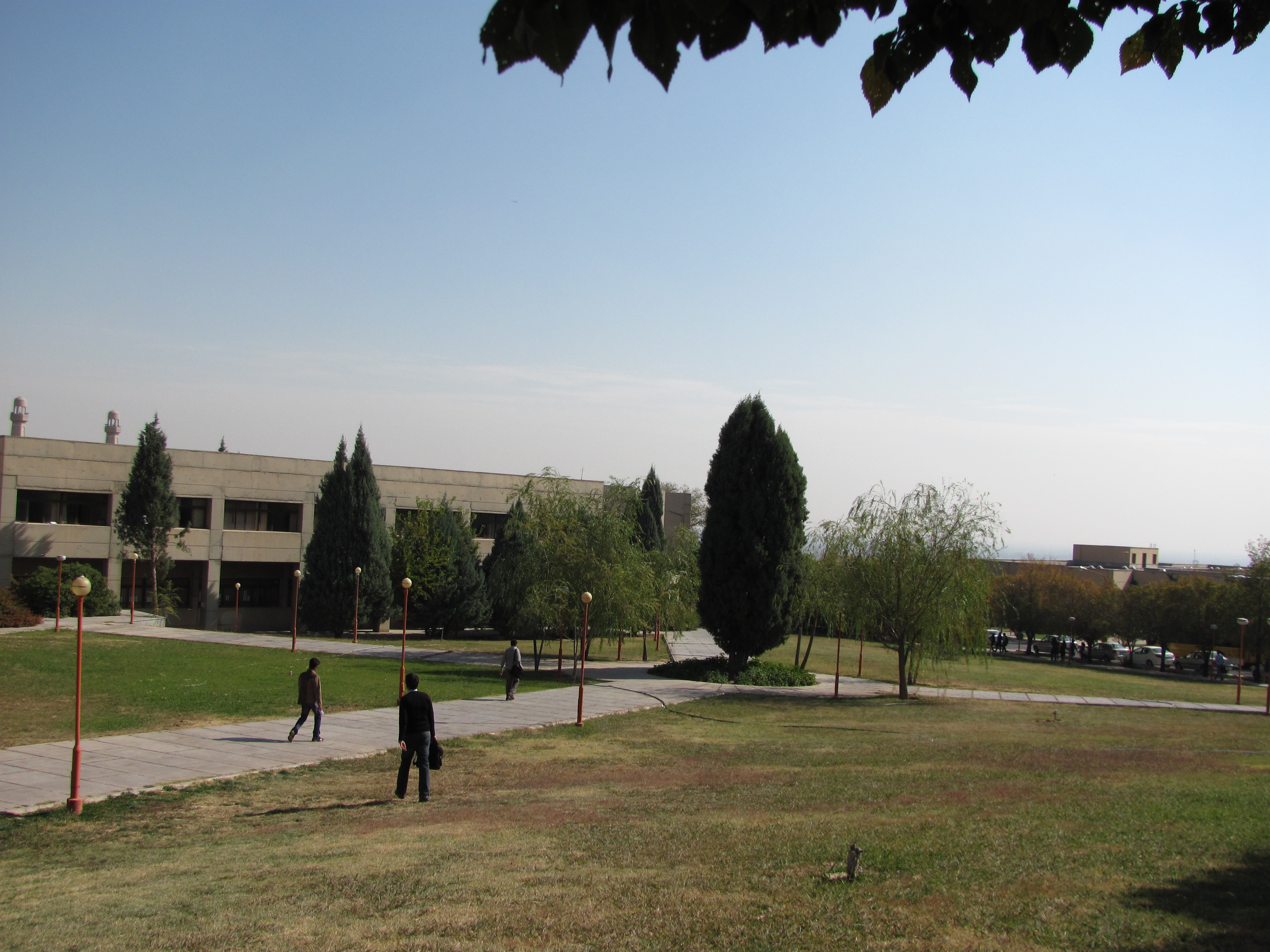
College of Mathematics

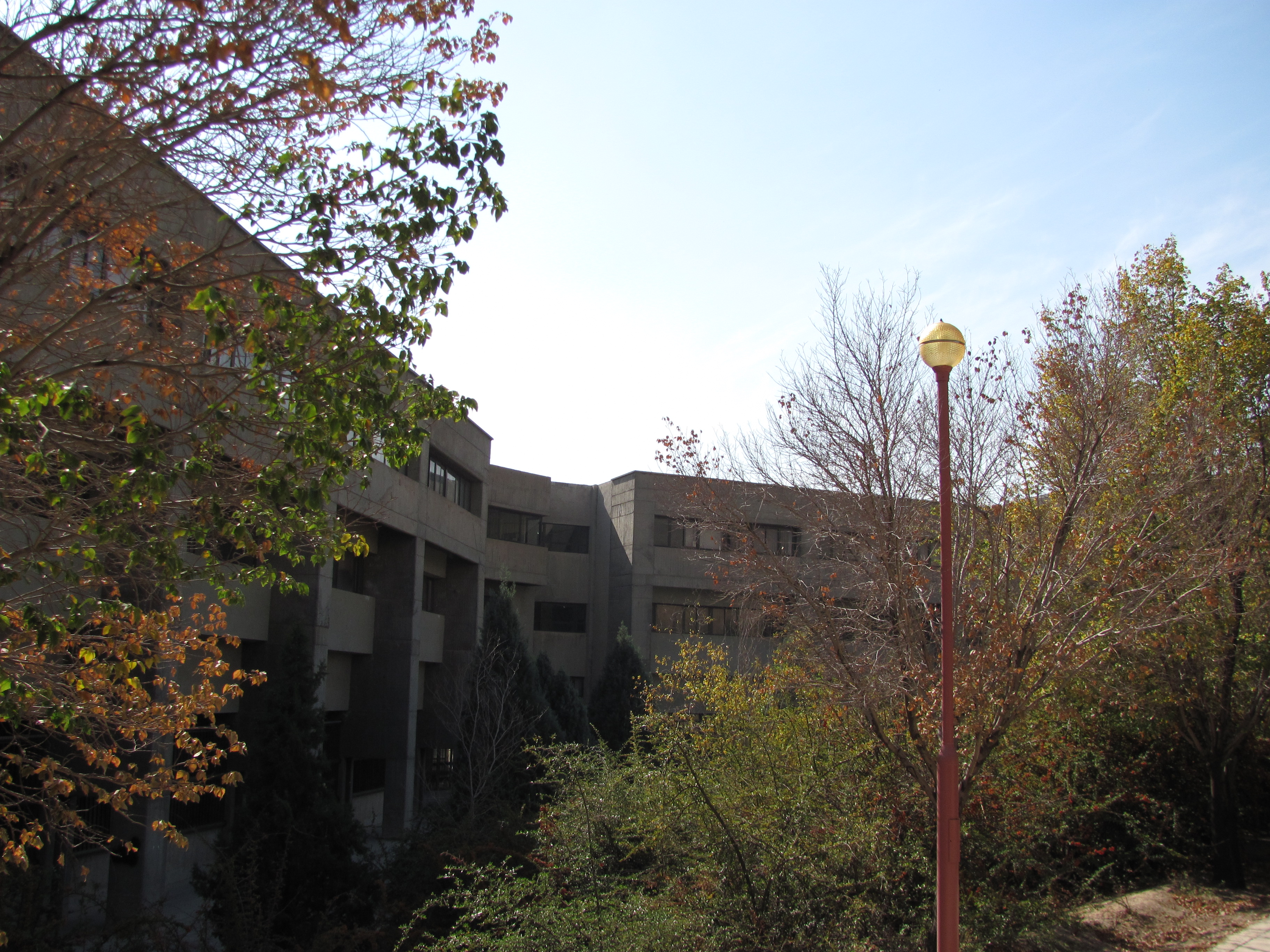
College of Mechanical Engineering

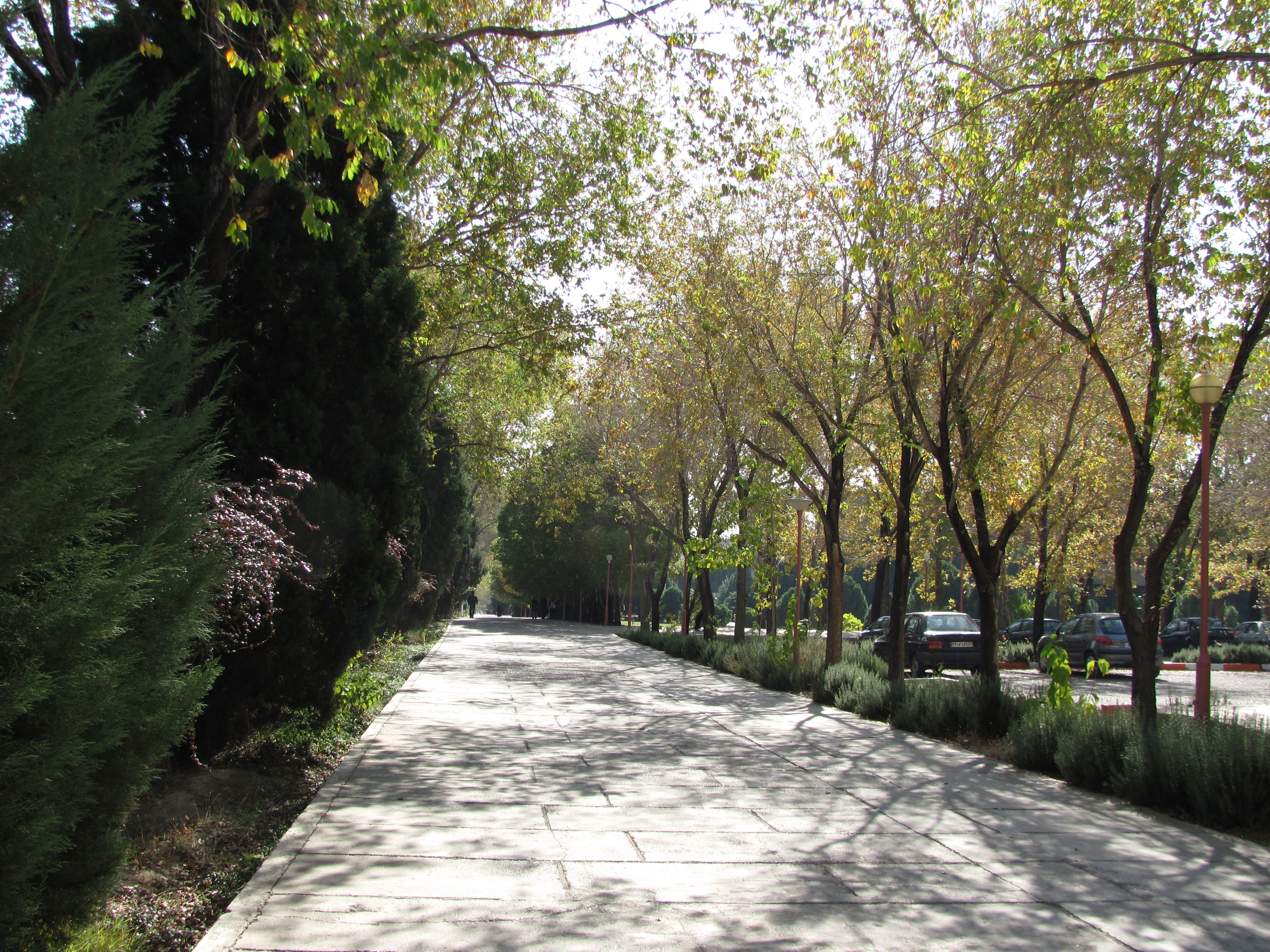
Campus

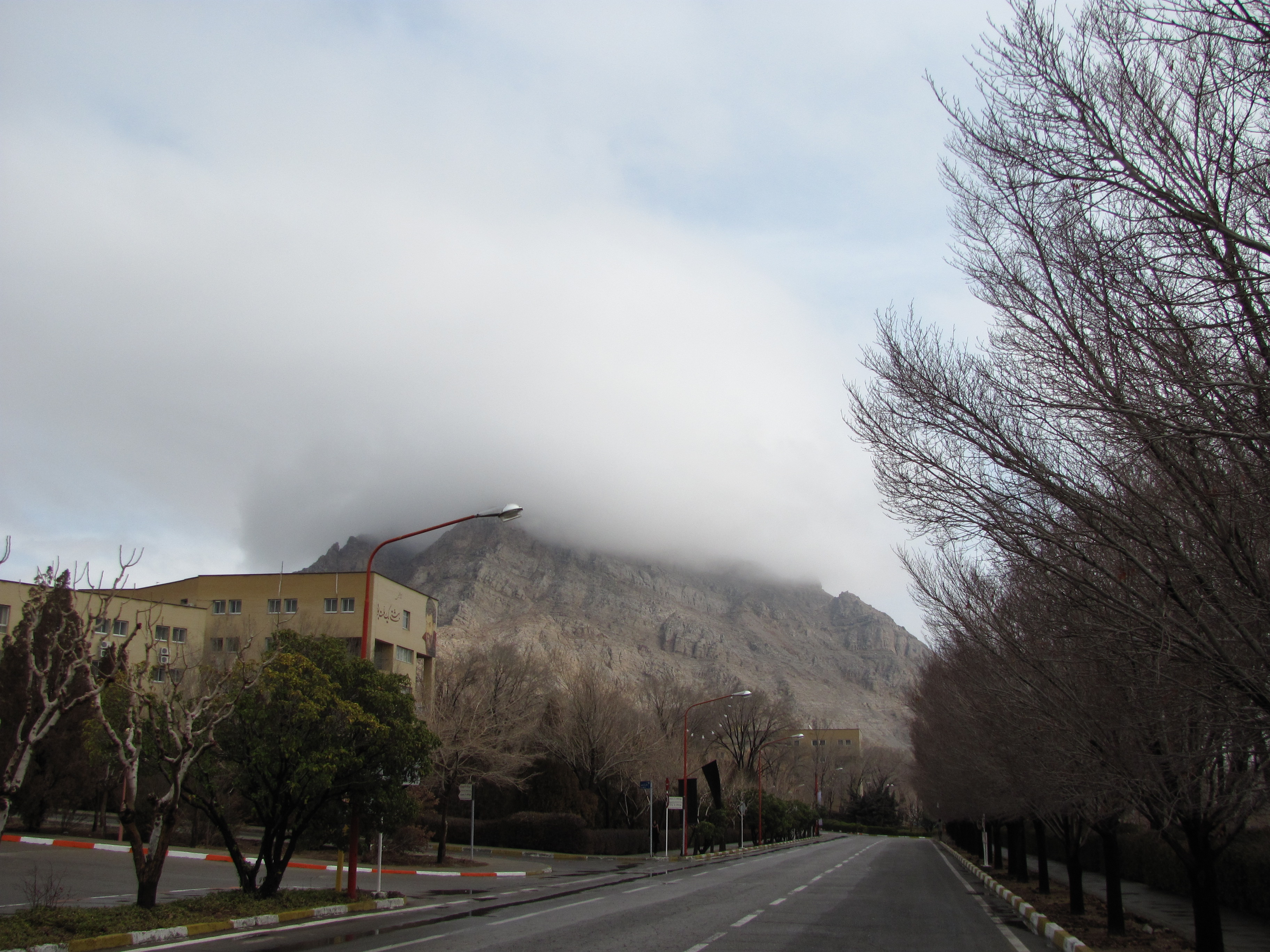
Campus

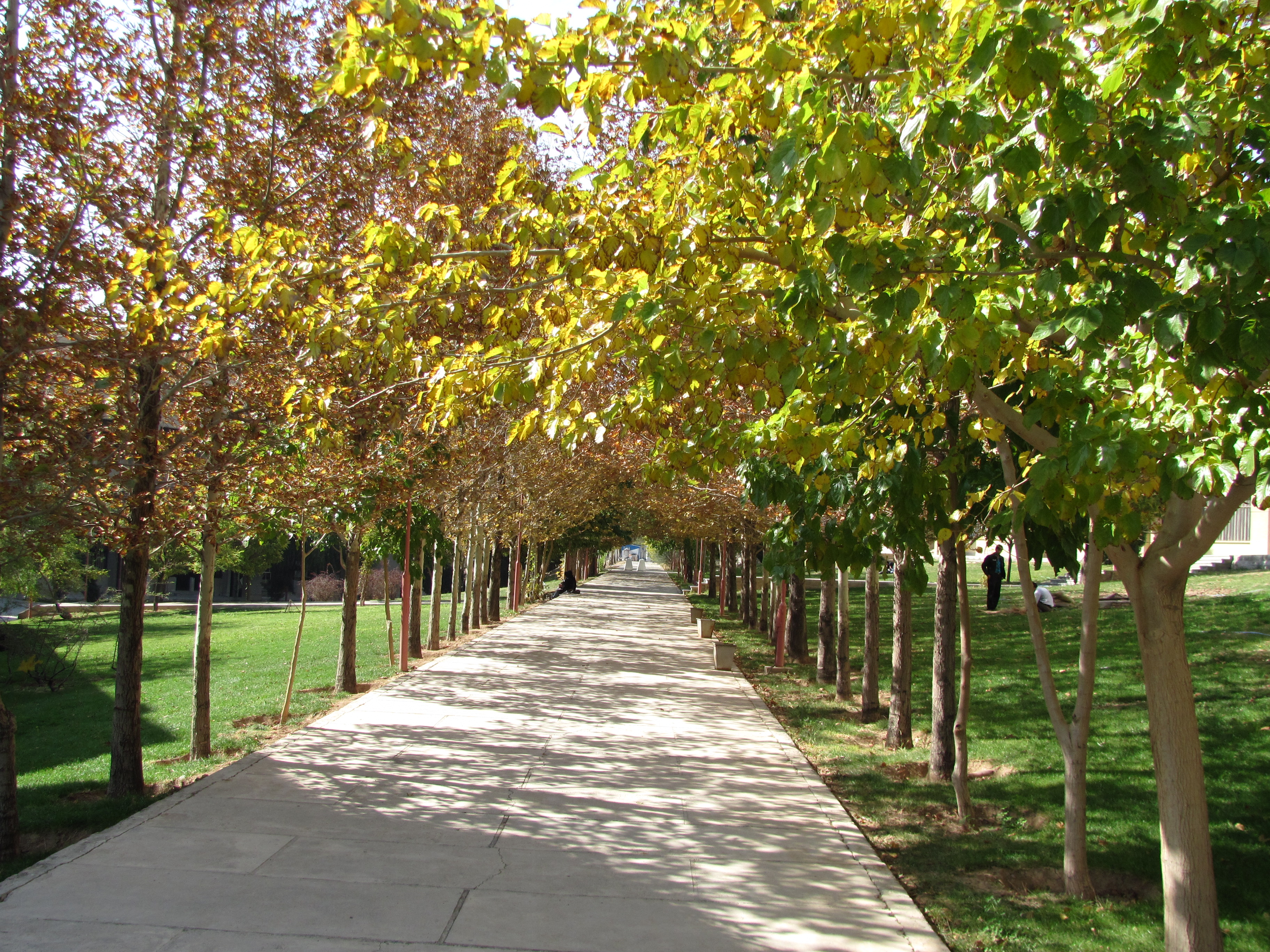
Campus

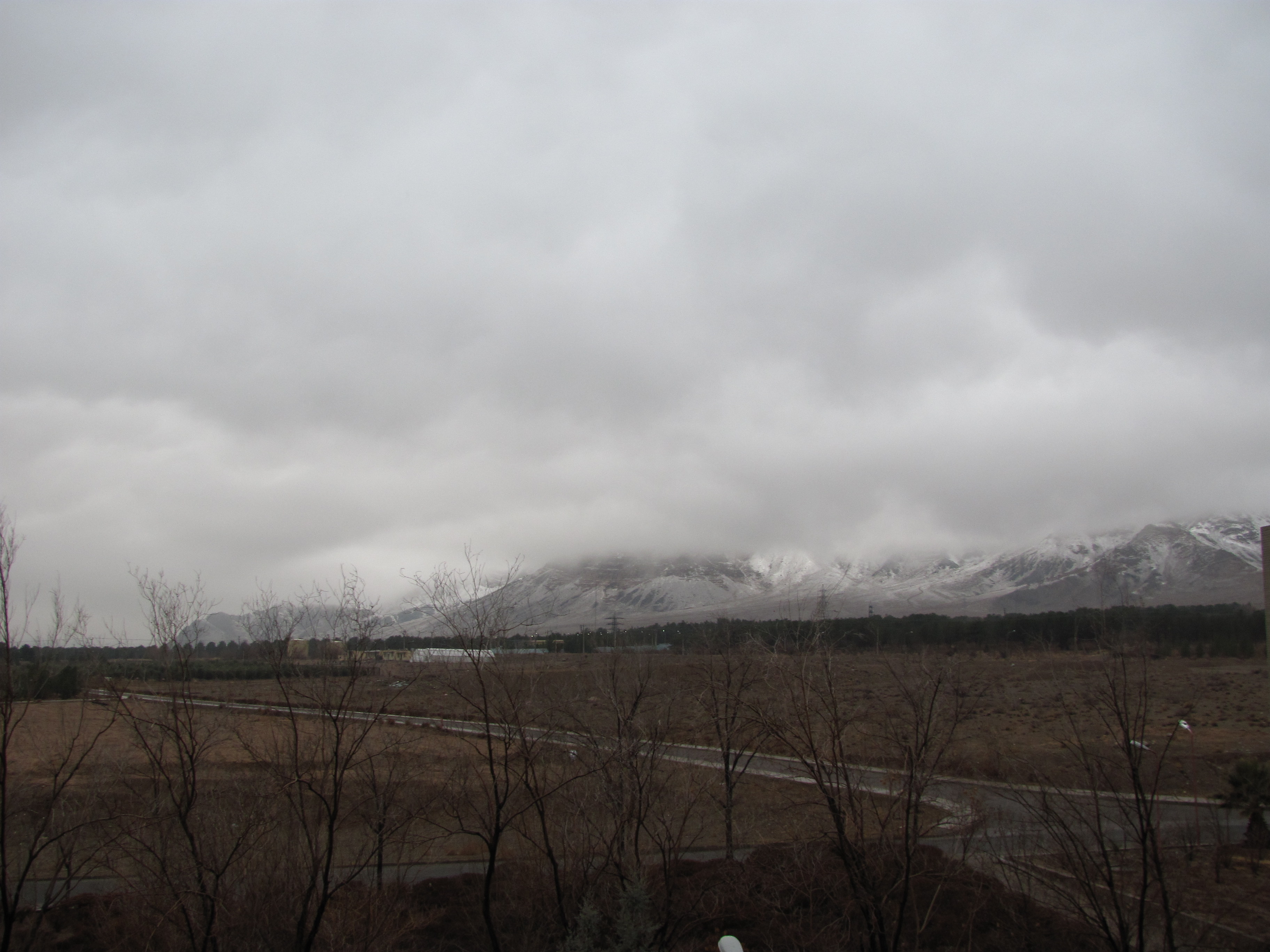
Campus

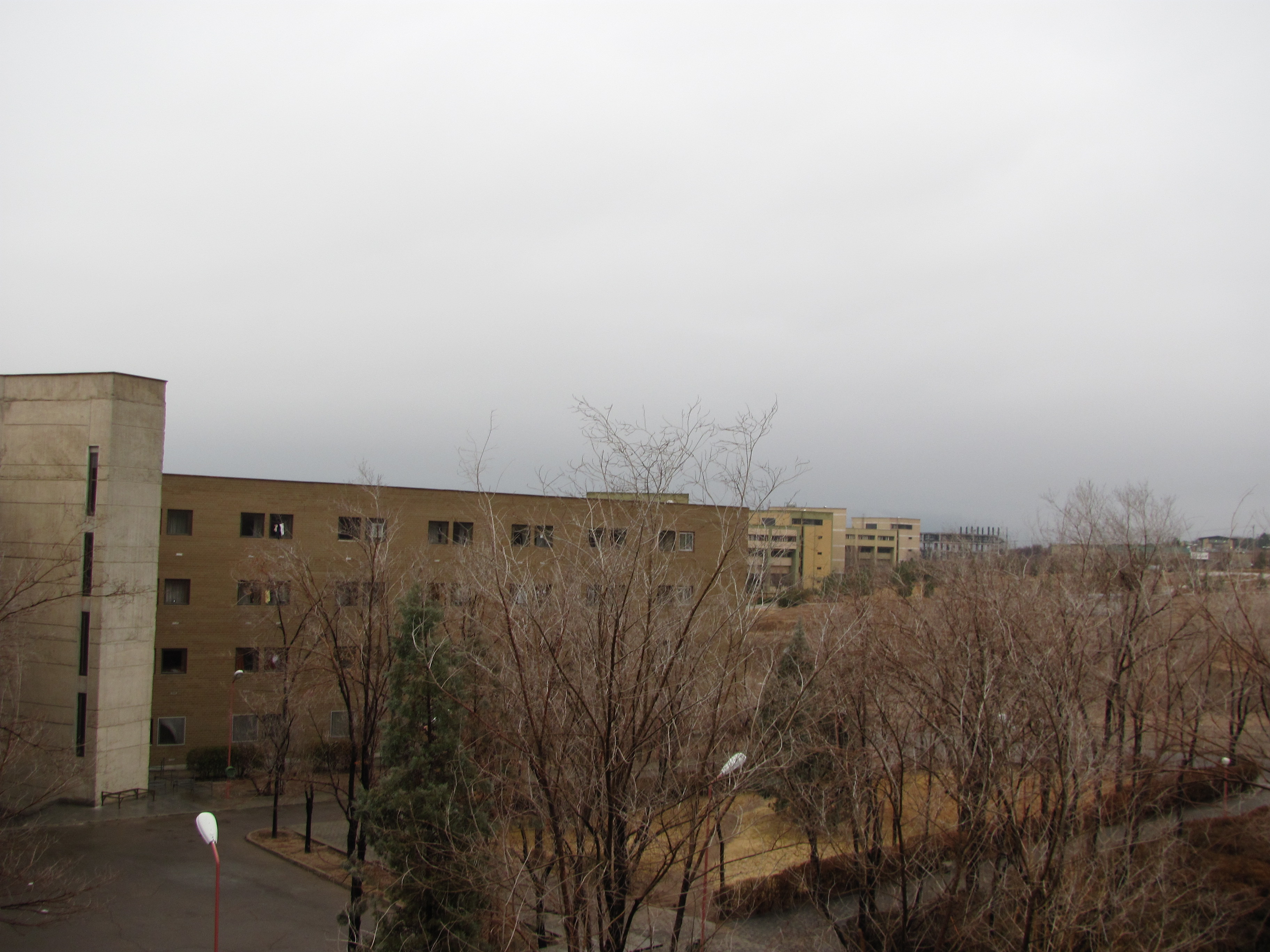
Dormitory

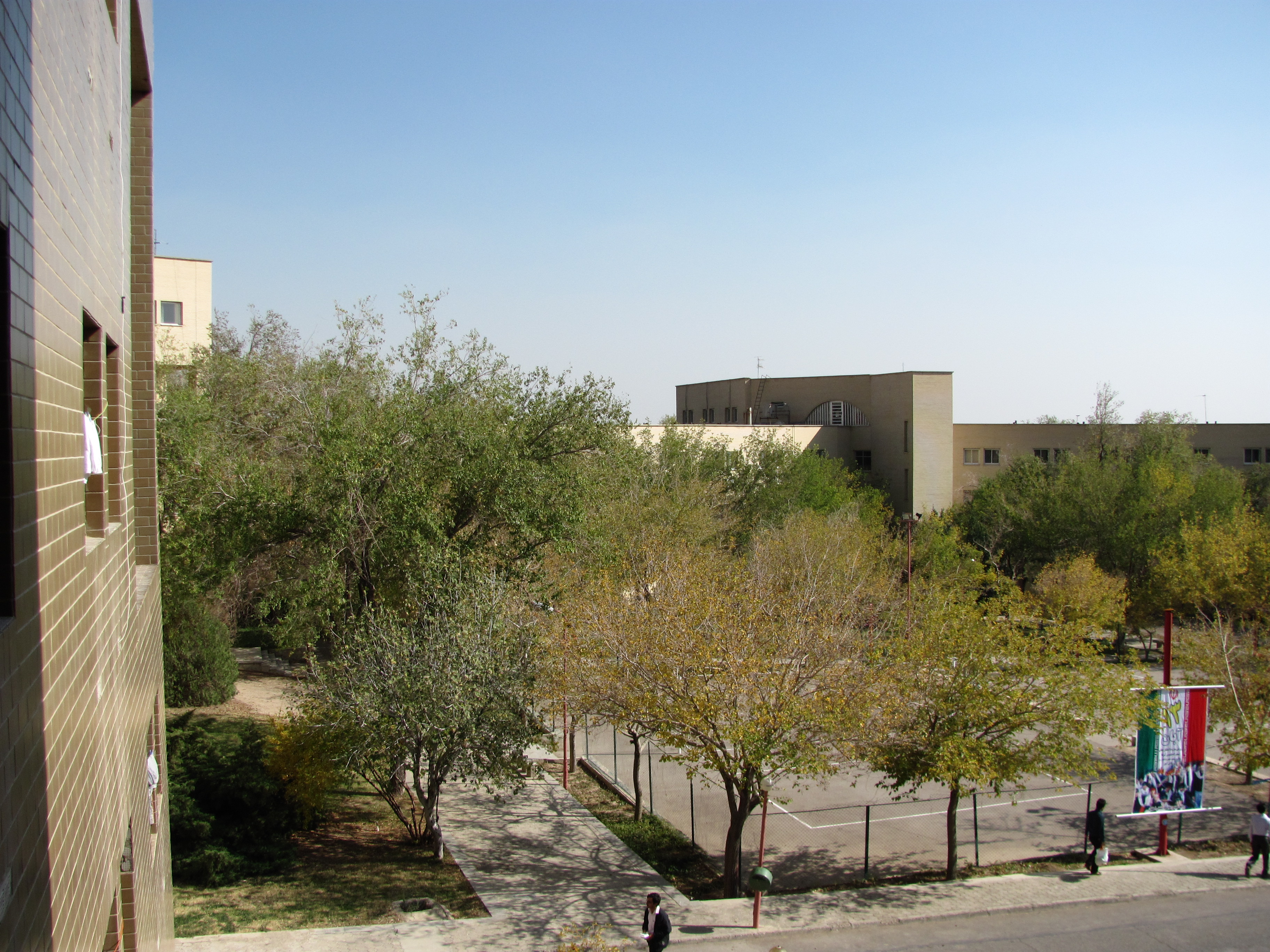
Dormitory

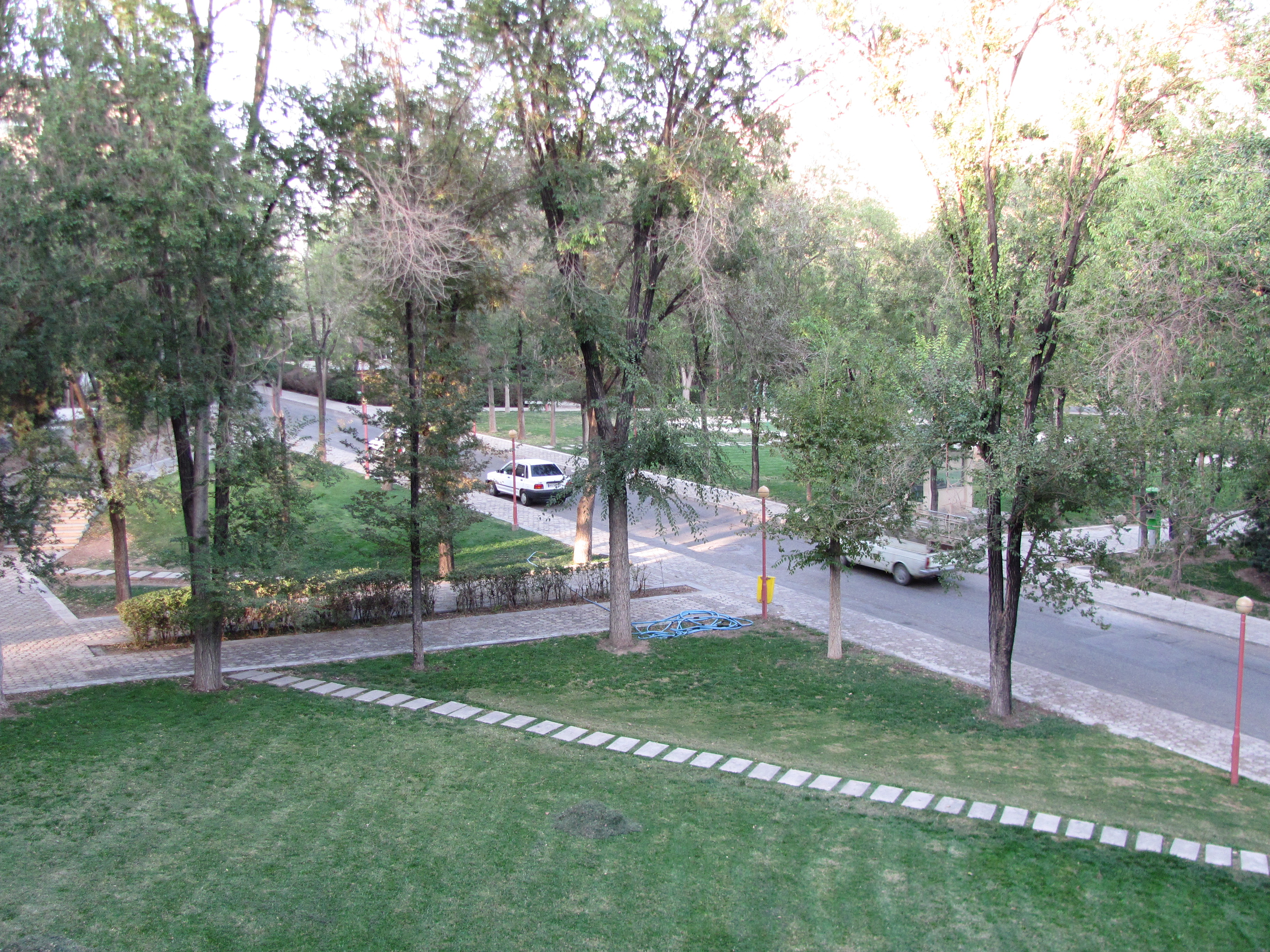
Dormitory

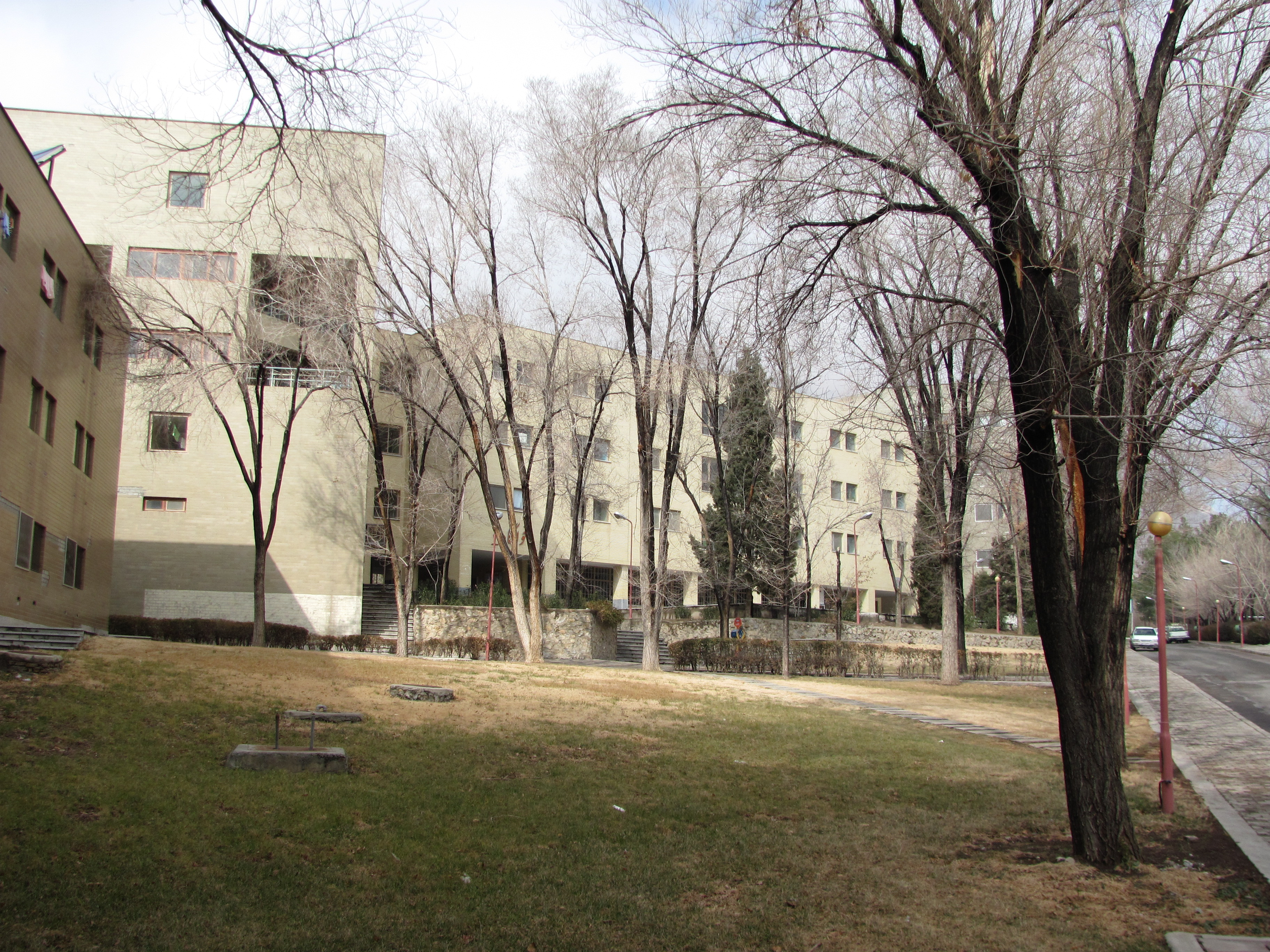
Dormitory.

== See also ==
- List of Islamic educational institutions
- Higher education in Iran
