= Mehdi Hajati =

Iranian activist

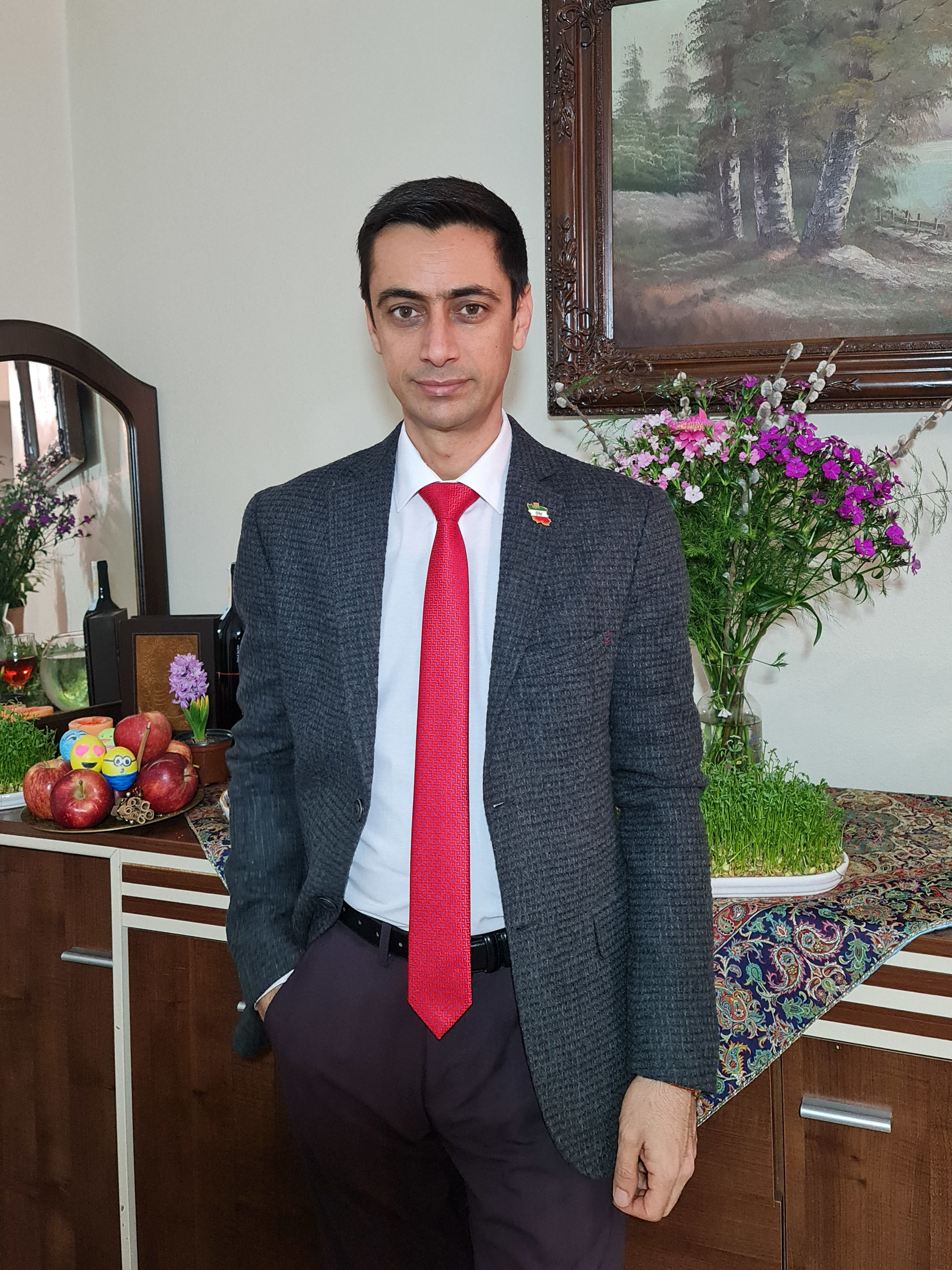

Member of City Council of Shiraz
- In office 23 August 2017 – 12 August 2019
- Succeeded by: Mohammad-Taghi Tazarvi

Mehdi Hajati (Persian: مهدی حاجتی) is an Iranian Political activist who was a member of the Islamic City Council of Shiraz. He was also the chairman of the Citizens' Rights Commission and the vice chairman of the Budget and Planning Commission.

== Arrest ==
In September, Hajati rose to nationwide prominence after he was arrested for speaking out against the arrests of two citizens of the Baháʼí Faith. His arrest lead to condemnation from inside and outside of Iran.

Hajati was released ten days after detention with a bail of US$47,500, he was banned from sitting on the Shiraz City Council and was placed under judicial supervision for six months.
