= Islamic Iran Freedom and Justice Organization =

- General Secretary: Mehdi Moghaddari
- Founded: c. 1997
- Legalized: 2001
- Headquarters: Isfahan, Iran
- Membership (2015): 500
- Ideology: Reformism
- National affiliation: Council for Coordinating the Reforms Front (2017–)
- Seats in the Parliament: 0 / 5 (0%)
- Isfahan City Council: 2 / 13 (15%)
- Tehran City Council: 0 / 21 (0%)
- Other elected councilors: 7 (2017)

Website
- booyebaran.ir

Islamic Iran Freedom and Justice Organization (IIFJO; Persian: سازمان عدالت و آزادی ایران اسلامی) is a reformist political party in Iran, based in the city of Isfahan. It operates in fifteen provinces of Iran.
