= Russian occupation of Tabriz =

Part of the Persian Constitutional Revolution (1909–1918)

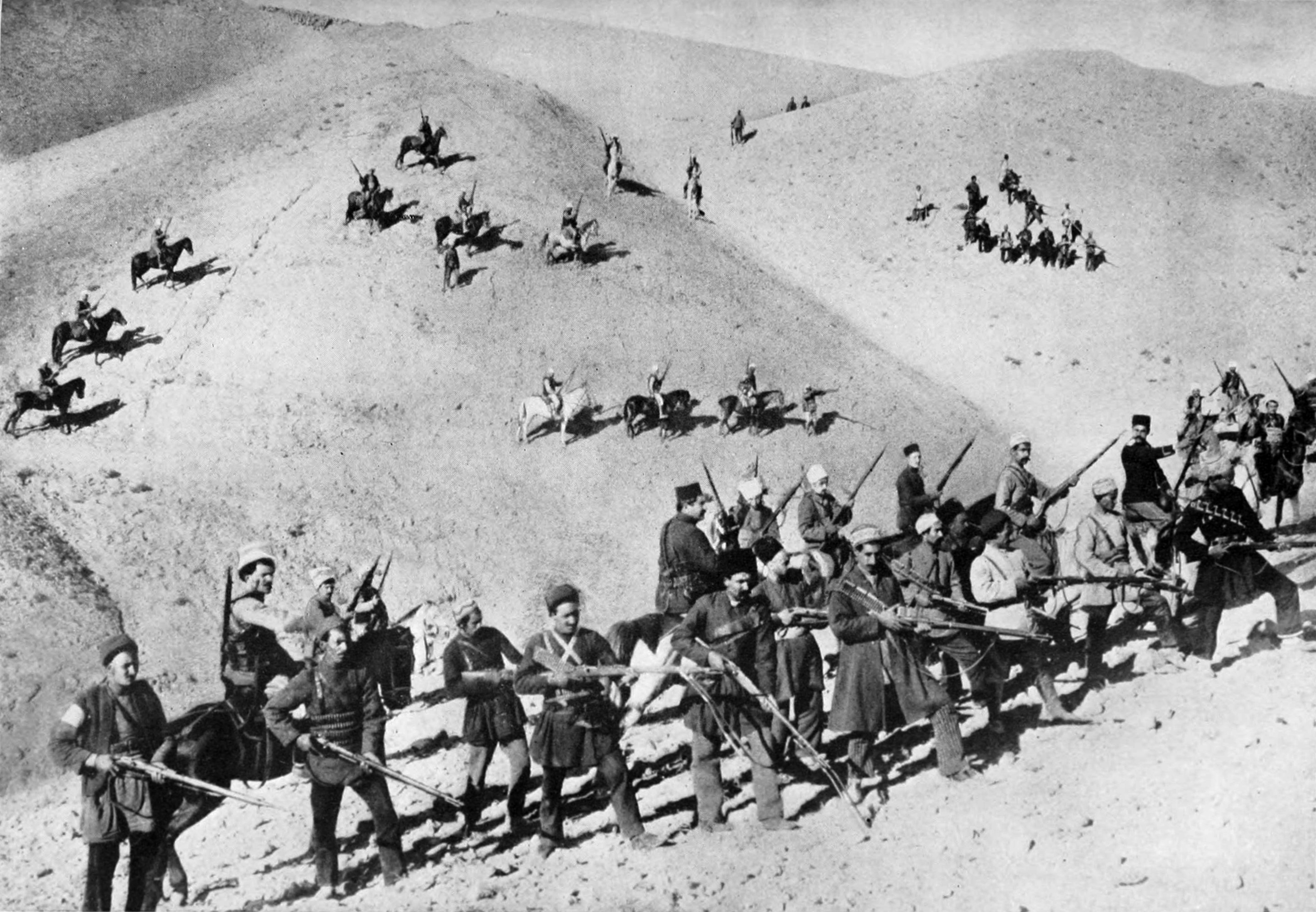
Tabriz defenders in the days before the fall of Tabriz.

The Russian occupation of Tabriz was a military occupation by the Russian Empire that lasted from 30 April 1909 to 28 February 1918, with a brief interruption from 6 to 31 January 1915. The occupation occurred during the Persian Constitutional Revolution and the subsequent years of World War I. At the time, Tabriz was the second-largest city of Qajar Iran, serving as the capital of the Azerbaijan region and the traditional seat of the Qajar Crown Prince.

== Russian intervention and occupation (1908–1918) ==
During the Persian Constitutional Revolution, officials of the Russian Empire viewed the upheaval in Iran as a threat to their commercial and strategic interests in the Caucasus frontier. Russian policymakers aimed to secure their northern sphere of influence, protect trade concessions, and suppress revolutionary movements spreading south from the Caucasus. Rebellion broke out in Tabriz on 23 June 1908. In early February 1909 government forces under Prince ʿAyn-al-dawla surrounded the city. On 20 April, in response to the siege situation, Britain, France and Russia agreed that a Russian force should be sent to occupy the city in order "to facilitate the entrance into the town of the necessary provisions, to protect the consulates and foreign subjects, and to help those who so desired to leave the town." The decision to send Russian troops also reflected concerns among tsarist officials about maintaining "order" in northern Iran and protecting economic privileges dating back to the Treaty of Turkmenchay (1828). Russian press coverage at the time, notably in Novoye Vremya, framed the occupation as essential to safeguarding those treaty rights.

The Russian force under General Snarski occupied Tabriz on 30 April 1909. Negotiations for its withdrawal soon began but dragged on into 1911. Russian diplomatic communications from this period show that local consuls, including Alexander Yakovlevich Miller in Tabriz, played a decisive role in maintaining the occupation and shaping policy on the ground, often acting with considerable autonomy from the Foreign Ministry in Saint Petersburg. On 29 November 1911, the Russian government presented the Iranian government with an ultimatum. Archival telegrams indicate that Russian consuls in Tabriz and Rasht repeatedly reported local unrest to justify the advance of Russian forces, while the Foreign Ministry focused its demands on the dismissal of the American lawyer Morgan Shuster and the curtailing of Iranian financial independence. Shuster had been hired by the Majlis (parliament) to organise the country's financial affairs. Upon the Persian parliament's refusal to fire Shuster, the shah dissolved the parliament and agreed to the Russian ultimatum. The ultimatum nevertheless created unrest in Tabriz. Russian officials in Tehran and Tabriz viewed the city’s revolutionary activity as part of a wider Caucasus-linked socialist and anti-imperialist network. On 21 December, fedayeen attacked the Russian troops, inflicting severe casualties. In response, a brigade of the Imperial Russian Army was dispatched to Tabriz under General Voropanov. Its aim was to occupy three major cities: Tabriz, Anzali and Rasht. The most fierce battle of the Russian invasion occurred in Tabriz, where the constitutionalists resisted. After about three days, the defense of the city's residents broke. The Russians shelled Tabriz with artillery and entered the city on 31 December.

Once in control, the Russians held courts martial to try the fedayeen. The Russians executed the constitutional revolutionaries of Tabriz and their relatives en masse and many civilians of Tabriz as well. the mass executions carried out in early January 1912 "marked the culmination of the Russian state’s turn against Iranian constitutionalism," intended to eradicate Tabriz’s revolutionary leadership. The total number of executions is estimated to have been about 1,200. The Seqat-ol-Eslam Tabrizi, a leader of the local Shaykhi sect, was among them. The Russians also destroyed part of the Arg of Tabriz by shelling it. Fire broke out in the Arg while it was held by Russian troops.

During the Russian occupation, Crown Prince Mohammad Hassan Mirza resided in Tabriz. Beginning in 1906 and through a Persian concession, a Russian government company had constructed a road from the Russian railhead at Julfa to Tabriz. While the region under Russian occupation, they upgraded the road to a railroad. It opened to traffic in May 1916 as the first railroad in Persia.

After the Ottoman entry into World War I in November 1914, Ottoman troops advanced into the Caucasus against Russia. This threatened to cut off the troops in Azerbaijan and an evacuation was ordered. Between 17 December 1914 and 6 January 1915, all Russian troops left Tabriz. Many local Christians, namely differing denominations of Assyrians, left with them. Ottoman Kurds under Aḥmad Mukhtār Bey Shamkhal occupied the city on 8 January.

The Ottoman–Kurdish occupation did not last long. The Ottomans were decisively defeated in the Battle of Sarikamish and the Russians were able to reoccupy the city on 31 January 1915. They remained in control until the Russian Revolution of November 1917 created disorder and confusion among the troops. The evacuation began in early 1918 and on 28 February the last Russian soldiers left Tabriz. On 18 June, the Ottomans began occupying the city.

== Gallery ==
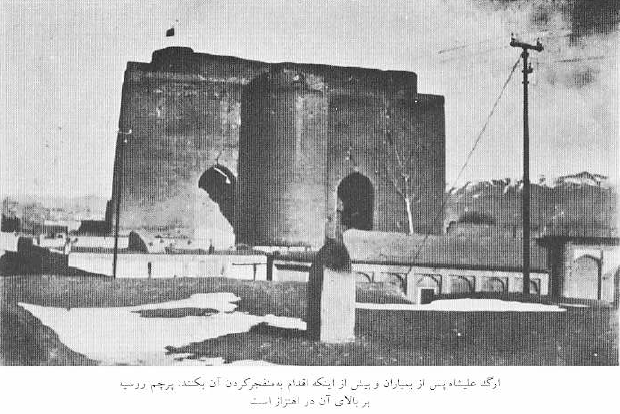
Russian flag over the Arg of Tabriz

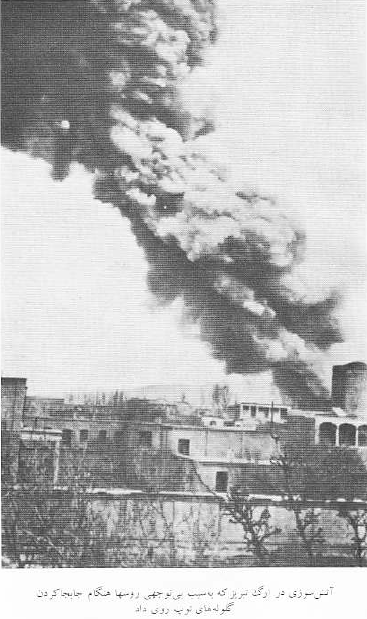
Fire in the Arg set by Russian troops

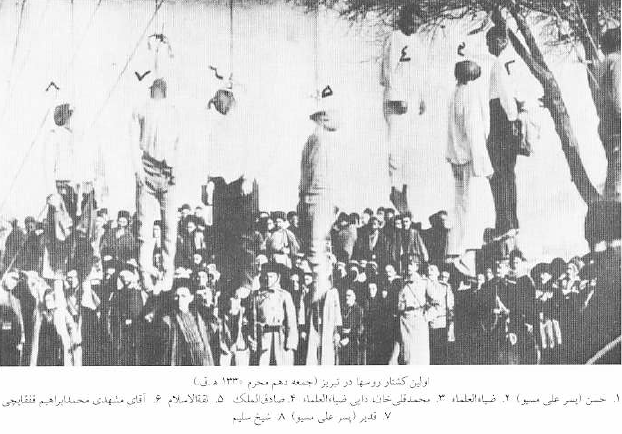
First round of execution of revolutionaries and Tabrizi people by Russian forces. The gibbet is colored in the Russian Tsar's flag colors

== See also ==
- Tabriz during World War I
- Timeline of Tabriz

== Sources ==
- Nejad, Kayhan (2025). "Russian Officialdom and the Iranian Constitutional Revolution, 1905–1911". Iranian Studies. 58 (3): 418–438. doi:10.1017/irn.2025.26.
