= 1641 Tabriz earthquake =

Earthquake centered in northwestern Iran

- Location within Iran
- Local date: 5 February 1641
- Magnitude: 6.8 M_{s}
- Epicenter: 37.9°N 46.1°E
- Areas affected: Iran, Tabriz
- Max. intensity: MMI IX (Violent)
- Casualties: 12,613–30,000 dead

The 1641 Tabriz earthquake occurred on the night of 5 February in present-day East Azerbaijan province, Iran. The earthquake had an estimated surface-wave magnitude of 6.8 and an epicenter between Lake Urmia and the city of Tabriz. It was one of the most destructive earthquakes in the region, killing as many as 30,000 people.

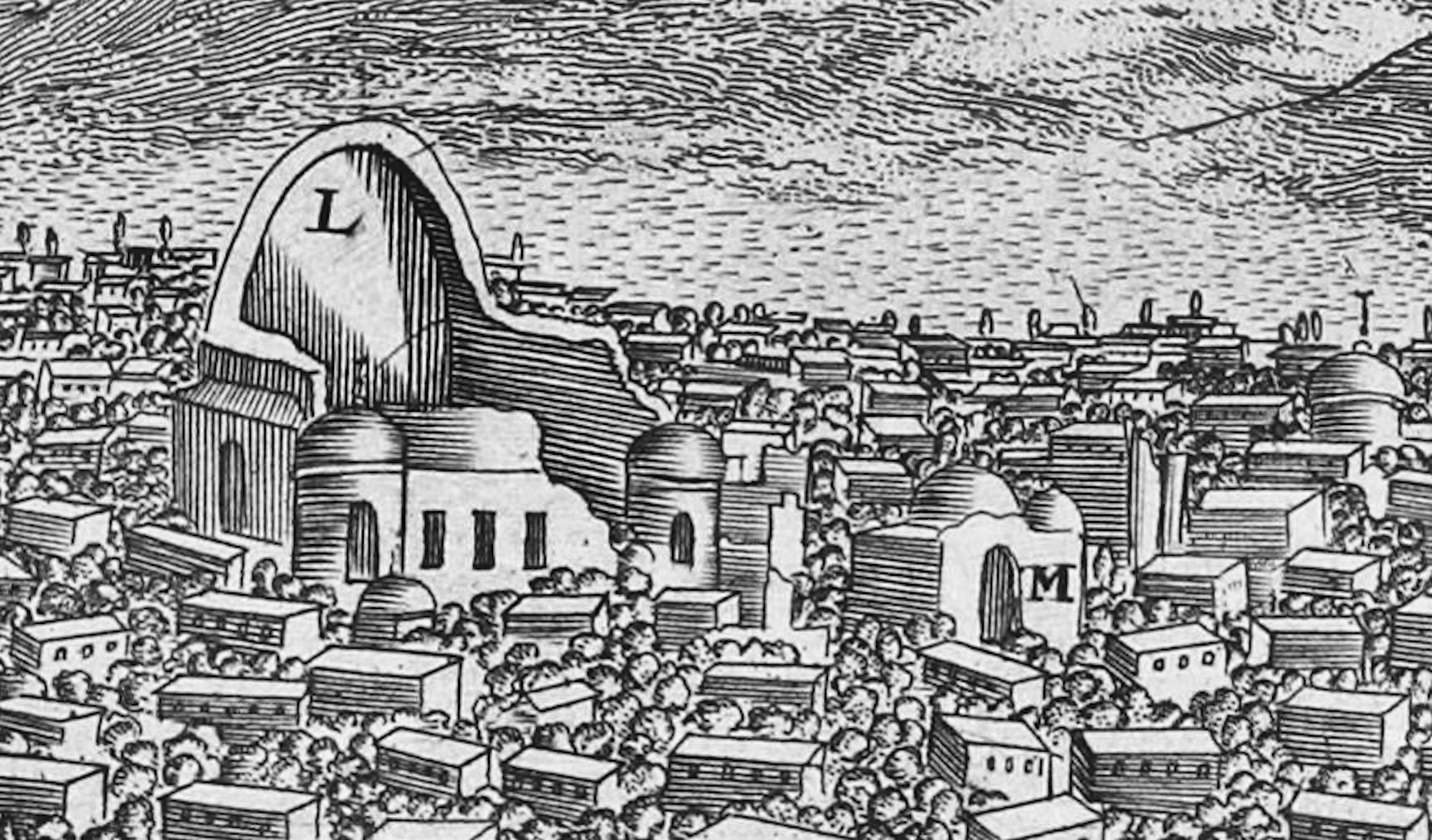
A sketch of the ruins of the Arg of Tabriz dated 1673

== Tectonic setting ==
Iran is situated on an active convergent boundary zone where the Arabian and Eurasian plates collide. The convergence occurs along the Zagros Mountains where it is accommodated by an active fold and thrust belt. The convergence is also accommodated within central Iran by strike-slip faults. At Tabriz, the rate of convergence is estimated to be about 20 mm/yr. The city is located near a triple junction of the Arabian, Anatolian and Eurasian plates. The oblique convergence results in continental collision beneath the Caucasus and right-lateral strike-slip tectonics around Tabriz. One of the most prominent fault is the North Tabriz Fault, a WNW–ESE-trending, 100 km (62 mi) fault. The fault produced devastating earthquakes in 1721, 1780, and 1786.

== Earthquake ==
The M_{s} 6.8 earthquake ruptured a fault structure located south of the North Tabriz Fault, however this fault did not rupture during the earthquake, and the region where the earthquake occurred is dominated by normal faults. However, there is evidence of active left-lateral strike-slip faulting present such as on the Osku River, where it has been laterally displaced to slip along a fault that crosses beneath the stream.

A possible source of the earthquake is along the Dehkhargan Fault (also known as the Azarshahr–Tabriz Fault), a left-lateral fault that runs along the northwestern base of the Sahand volcano. This northeast–southwest striking fault extends from the city of Osku to Azarshahr. Some rivers originating from the volcano have been laterally displaced by 200 m (660 ft) at where they cross the fault. The fault's location corresponded with the area of greatest damage from the earthquake, a 40 km (25 mi) long, elongated northeast–southwest trending zone at the western base of Sahand. Based on the length of the damage zone, the fault is inferred to have a similar length. It comprises at least ten individual fault strands that cuts through conglomerate, volcano-sedimentary deposits, and Pliocene and Quaternary limestone. While it is a predominantly strike-slip fault, vertical displacements within the volcanoc landscape also indicate a small component of normal faulting.

== Damage ==
Researchers Nicholas Ambraseys and Charles P. Melville reported that the earthquake occurred on a Friday night. The communities of Khosrowshah, Osku and what is now present-day Azarshahr were completely devastated. Nearly all houses and public infrastructures, including historical monuments in Tabriz were razed to the ground. Many public baths and caravansaries were destroyed. A building in the city collapsed and buried many animals that were taking shelter from the winter season. Two important structures, the Masjid-i Ustad-Shagird and Arg of Tabriz suffered heavy damage. A large number of mosques experienced serious damage to their domes and minarets. The shock was also felt in Baghdad. On Sahand, a rockslide was triggered, destroying a village and killing many. Fissures appeared in the ground and erupted water. The earthquake was misdated to the years 1441, 1049, 1639, 1642, 1646, and 1651. Efforts to recover personal belongings and the dead continued for a month. Aftershocks were felt for six months. In the immediate aftermath of the earthquake, many survivors resided outside the ruins of their homes. Some residents returned to their homes but were killed due to collapses during the aftershocks. During the first two months after the earthquake, up to seven aftershocks were felt in a day.

== See also ==
- List of historical earthquakes
- List of earthquakes in Iran
