= Arg of Tabriz =

Iranian national heritage site

- ارگ تبريز
- Near Tabriz in Iran
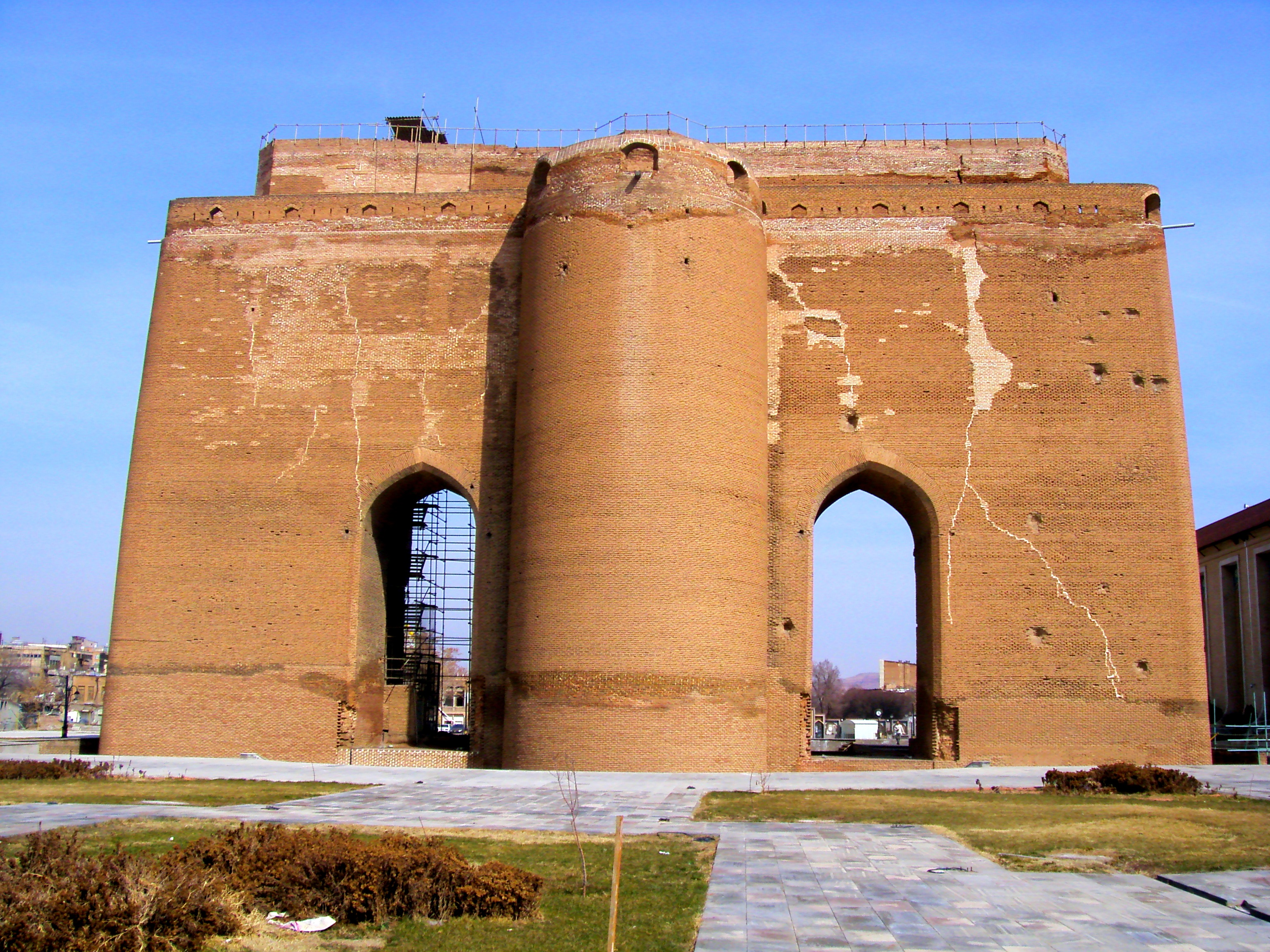
- Arg of Tabriz, 2022

Site information
- Type: Mausoleum and mosque (14th century–1641); Citadel and barracks (19th–20th centuries); Park (20th century); Mosque
- Condition: Partial ruinous state

Location
- Location of the Arg in Iran
- Coordinates: 38°04′20″N 46°17′20″E

Site history
- Built: 710 AH (1310/1311 CE)–720 AH (1320/1321 CE)
- Materials: Bricks
- Fate: Monument

Masjid-i-Jami of Ali Shah
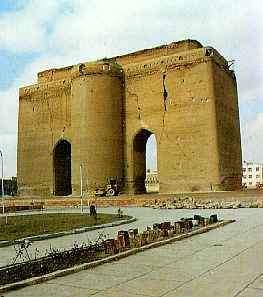
- The mosque with minaret, in 2017

Religion
- Affiliation: Shia Islam (former)
- Ecclesiastical or organisational status: Mausoleum and mosque (14th century–1641)
- Status: Inactive (partial ruinous state)

Location
- Location: Tabriz, East Azerbaijan
- Country: Iran
- Coordinates: 38°04′20″N 46°17′20″E

Architecture
- Architect: Falaki Tabrizi
- Type: Mosque architecture
- Style: Ilkhanate
- Founder: Ali Shah
- Completed: 710 AH (1310/1311 CE)–720 AH (1320/1321 CE)
- Demolished: 1641 CE (partially collapsed due to the Tabriz earthquake)

Specifications
- Minaret: Two (since destroyed)
- Minaret height: 61 m (200 ft)
- Materials: Bricks, marble, tiles

Iran National Heritage List
- Official name: Arg of Tabriz/Alishah Mosque
- Type: Fortification/Mosque
- Designated: 1932
- Reference no.: 170
- Conservation organization: Cultural Heritage, Handicrafts and Tourism Organization of Iran

The Arg of Tabriz (Persian: ارگ تبريز, romanized: Arg-e Tabriz), and also known as the Arg-e Alishah, the Arch of Alishah, the Arg Citadel, and Masjid Ali-Shāh, is the remnants of a large acropolis fortification (whence the metathetic name ark or arg plus polis), city wall and mosque, located in downtown Tabriz, in the province of East Azerbaijan, Iran. Its structure has long been visible from far distances in Tabriz, more recently partially obscured by newly-erected buildings.

The structure was initially a compound, containing a great vaulted mosque, adjoining prayer halls and libraries, a vast courtyard containing a huge reflecting pool, and a mausoleum—all surrounded by a containing wall. It was built in the 14th century during the Ilkhanate era. The point of pride for the building was that its vaulted ayvan was larger than the famous historic vault of Khosrow/Kisra, the Taq Kasra at Ctesiphon/Mada'in. However, with the sudden death of the governor of the city and with some construction complications in constructing a roofed building without pillar for such a huge complex, the mausoleum structure remained incomplete.

In the 19th century with the rise of tensions between Iran and Russia the structure rapidly turned into the city's fort and additional military installations such as a barracks and cannon foundry were added to the original structure. During the 20th century, the military installations were removed from original construction and the surrounding of the ark turned into a park. In the late 20th century a big mosque was built next to the citadel.

The former mosque was added to the Iran National Heritage List in 1932, administered by the Cultural Heritage, Handicrafts and Tourism Organization of Iran.

== History ==
=== Ali Shah Mosque ===
The original construction of the mosque was made between 710 AH (1310/1311 CE) and 720 AH (1320/1321 CE), during the Ilkhanate era by Ali Shah, the Iranian vizier during the reign of Oljeitu and Abu Sa'id. Organized around four iwans, and oriented towards qibla, the Ali Shah Mosque had a marble paved rectangular sahn, 286 metres (938 ft) wide by 229 metres (751 ft) long, that was entered through a pishtaq. The mihrab, visible at the centre of the only remaining qibla wall, has three relieving arches above it; and on either side of the mihrab are two windows, high above ground level. Bounded by large plain brick walls of all four sides, the sahn contained an octagonal fountain, with four stone lion monuments sprouting water, and surrounding trees. The walls were broken only by the curved corners of the qibla and the rounded bastion behind the mihrab recess.

The main iwan barrel vault was 30.5 metres (100 ft) wide and 48 metres (157 ft) deep, with a total distance of 65.5 metres (215 ft) between the portal and the mihrab. The total height of the vault was over 45.7 metres (150 ft), rising 21.7 metres (71 ft) above the 24 metres (79 ft) high base. During the construction, the main barrel vault collapsed and the construction was stopped afterward. Two minarets also rose from the same 24 metres (79 ft) high base, rising a further 35.4 metres (116 ft) to a total of 61 metres (200 ft). Attached to either side of the iwan walls were also a madrasa and a khanqa. Little is known about these two structures, as both have completely collapsed.

An earthquake in 1641 severely damaged and collapsed the monument. Centuries later, between the eruption of the Russo-Persian War (1804–1813), and the Russo-Persian War (1826–1828), the compound was quickly reconstructed as a military compound. During the reconstruction of the Arg compound, a foundry factory for the manufacturing of cannons for the Iranian Army was built as well as a military headquarters, a barrack for the troops, and a small palace. Samson Makintsev (better known as Samson Khan) a Qajar Iranian general of Russian origin, lived inside the citadel for years together with his wife, the daughter of Prince Aleksandre of Georgia.

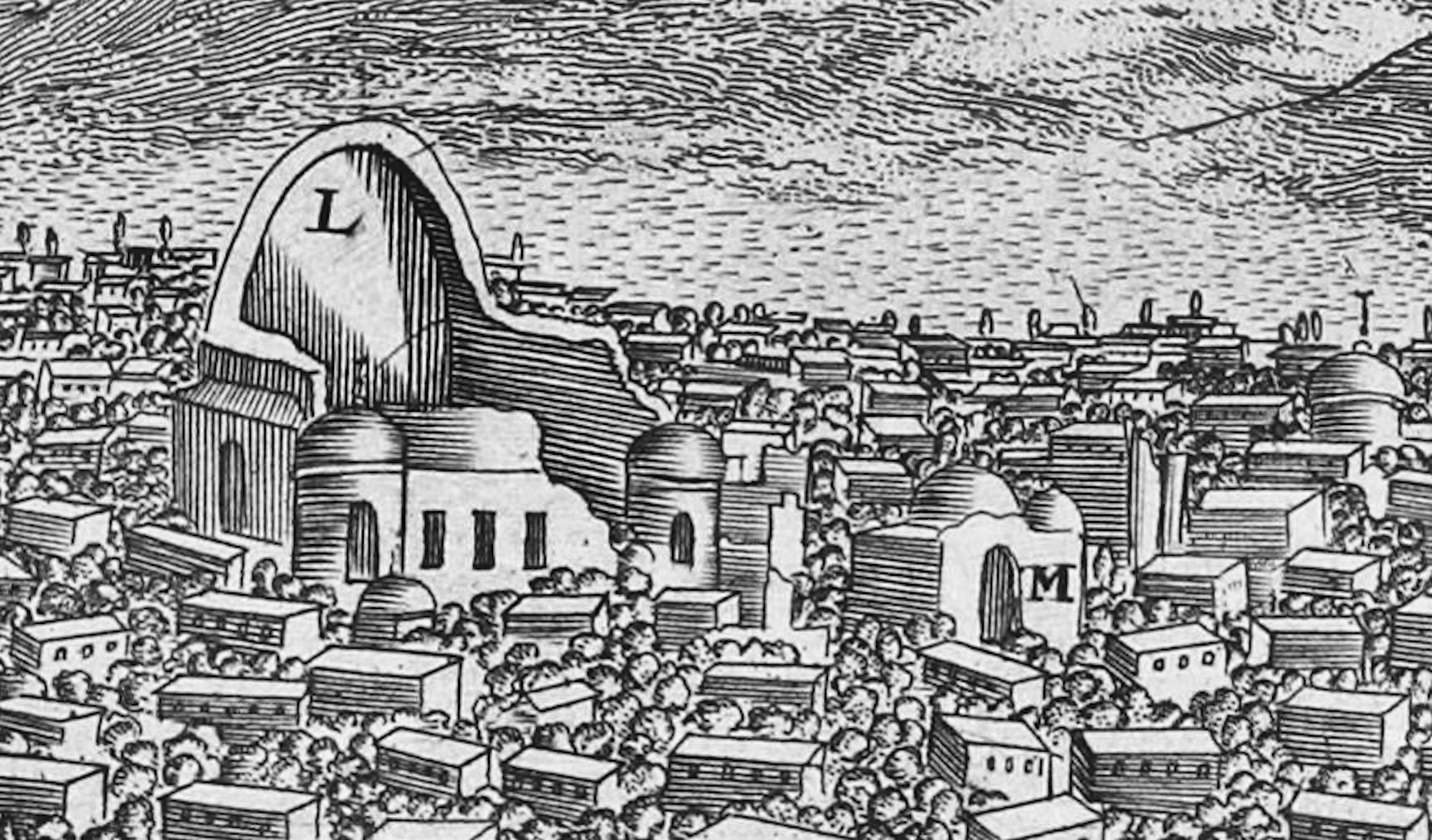
Remnants of the Arg of Tabriz, in Jean Chardin's drawing of Tabriz, 1673.

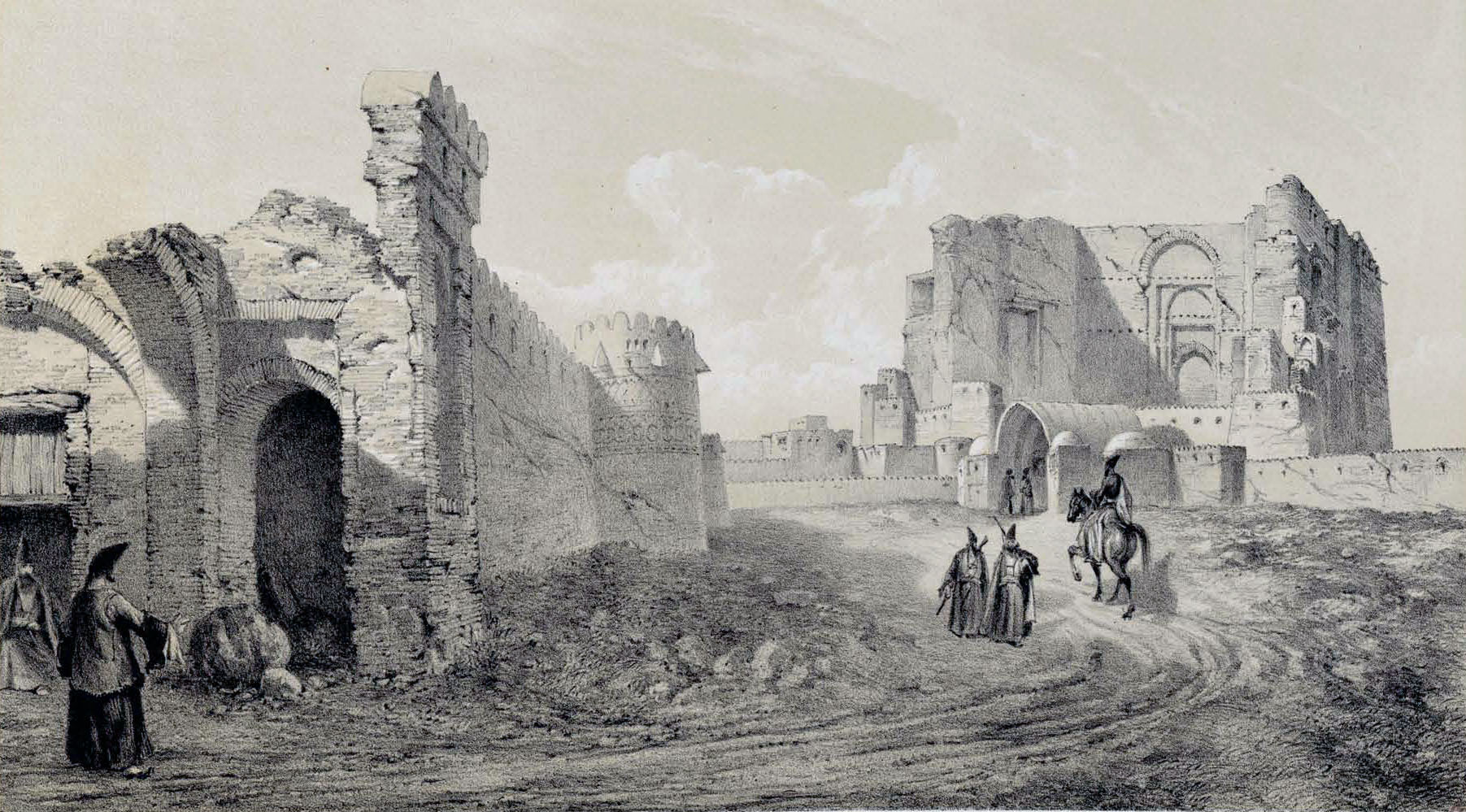
Ruins of the Arg, Eugène Flandin 1840.

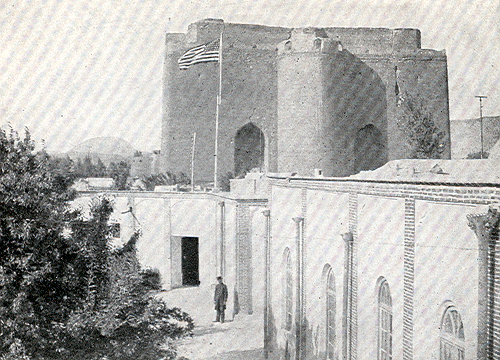
A US flag flies over the US Consulate near the Arg during the Persian Constitutional Revolution.

=== Shelling of Arg by Russian troops, 1911 ===
During the 1911 Russian invasion of Tabriz, the Russians shelled the Arg in initial attacks. Once they captured the city, they used the Arg as a central command center. During their occupation, because of careless handling, the artillery pieces they used set fire to parts of Arg.

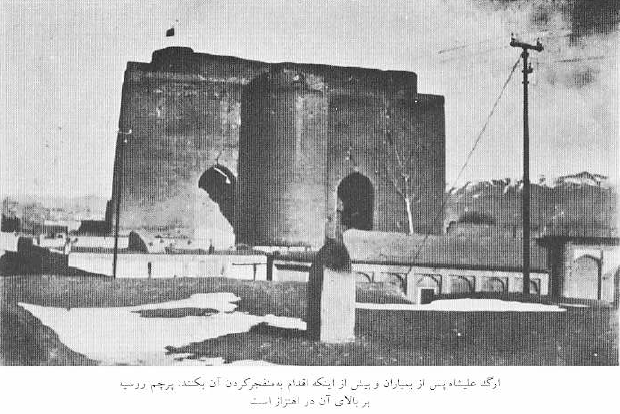
Russian flag over the Arg, during 1911 Russian invasion.

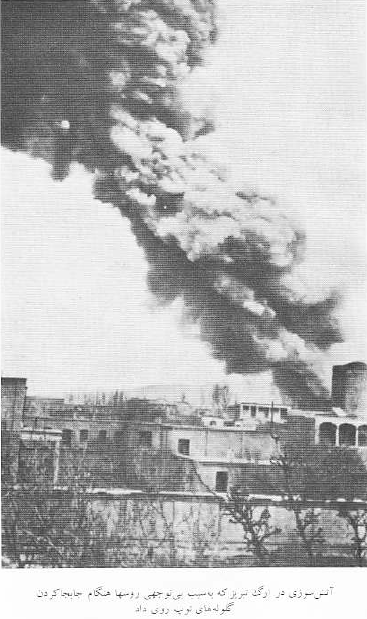
Fire in the Arg due to careless handling of artillery pieces by Russian troops.

=== Destruction during the Pahlavi era ===
During the Pahlavi era, parts of the Arg, presumed to have been constructed in the 19th century during the Qajar dynasty, were destroyed. In the process much of the old Ilkhanid and Safavid remnants were also unwittingly destroyed, leaving only a tiny section of the back wall containing the mihrab intact. This destruction was with the aim of leaving behind only the original Arg construction, ridding it of its later additions and constructions. Much of the original building was lost in the process. The southern part of the Arg was turned into a park, the "Mellat Garden" (lit. park of the people), before the 1979 Iranian revolution.

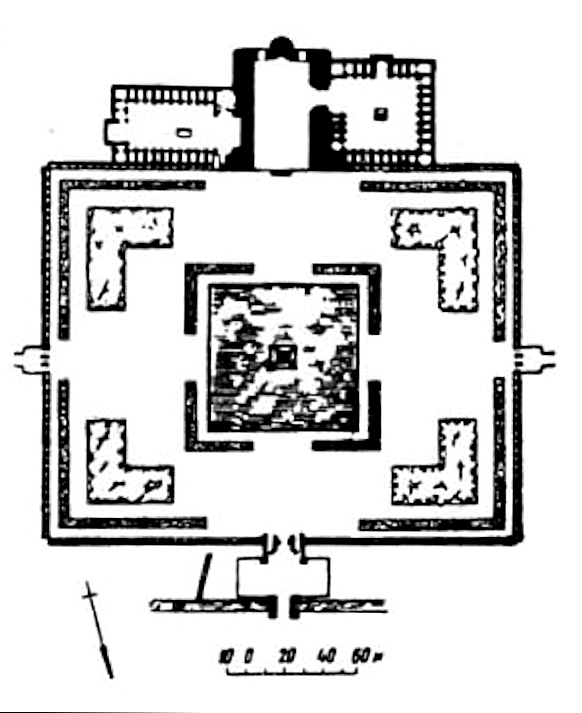
A plan for reconstruction of the Arg's surrounding before the 1979 revolution.

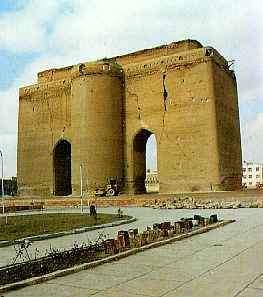
Mellat Garden in, south of the Ark, before the 1979 revolution.

=== Destruction by revolutionaries, early 1980s ===
In the early 1980s after the suppression of uprising of supporters of Muslim People's Republic Party against the new establishment of mixing religion and state and neglecting of Azerbaijani minorities, Moslem Malakuti selected Juma of Tabriz as the new Imam. During his tenure in Tabriz, Juma began the destruction of the Arg's Qajar era addendum wall, cultural institutes, and ark theater and replaced them with a new mosque for Friday prayers. Some people believe this destruction of local heritage was a systematic destruction of local Azerbaijani identity.

=== Recent renovation, 1990s-present ===
In the 1990s and 2000s, a rehabilitation and renovation project was executed by the Iranian Organization for Cultural Heritages. During this rehabilitation, however, all of the remaining Qajar era development from the Arg citadel were destroyed. At the same period, a new big mosque was built next to the Arg citadel. The superstructure of the new mosque undermines the architecture of the Arg citadel. Despite the regulations of the Iranian Organization for Cultural Heritages and several court hearings, the construction of the new structure was completed.

The construction of the mosque completely destroyed the ancient foundations of the original Arg that existed underground and were going to be used for a reconstruction attempt at the end of the Pahlavi era. Thus, the new Islamic regime eliminated any chance of methodical reconstruction by wiping out the remaining foundations of the Arg. Meanwhile, the main prayer hall of the ancient mosque was turned into a car park, in direct violation of the edict of the Koran which considered a mosque's ground to be sacred and inviolable as long as the traces of it remain. It is visually clear that the new car park was created on the remains of the main prayer hall of the 700-year old grand mosque.

== Gallery ==
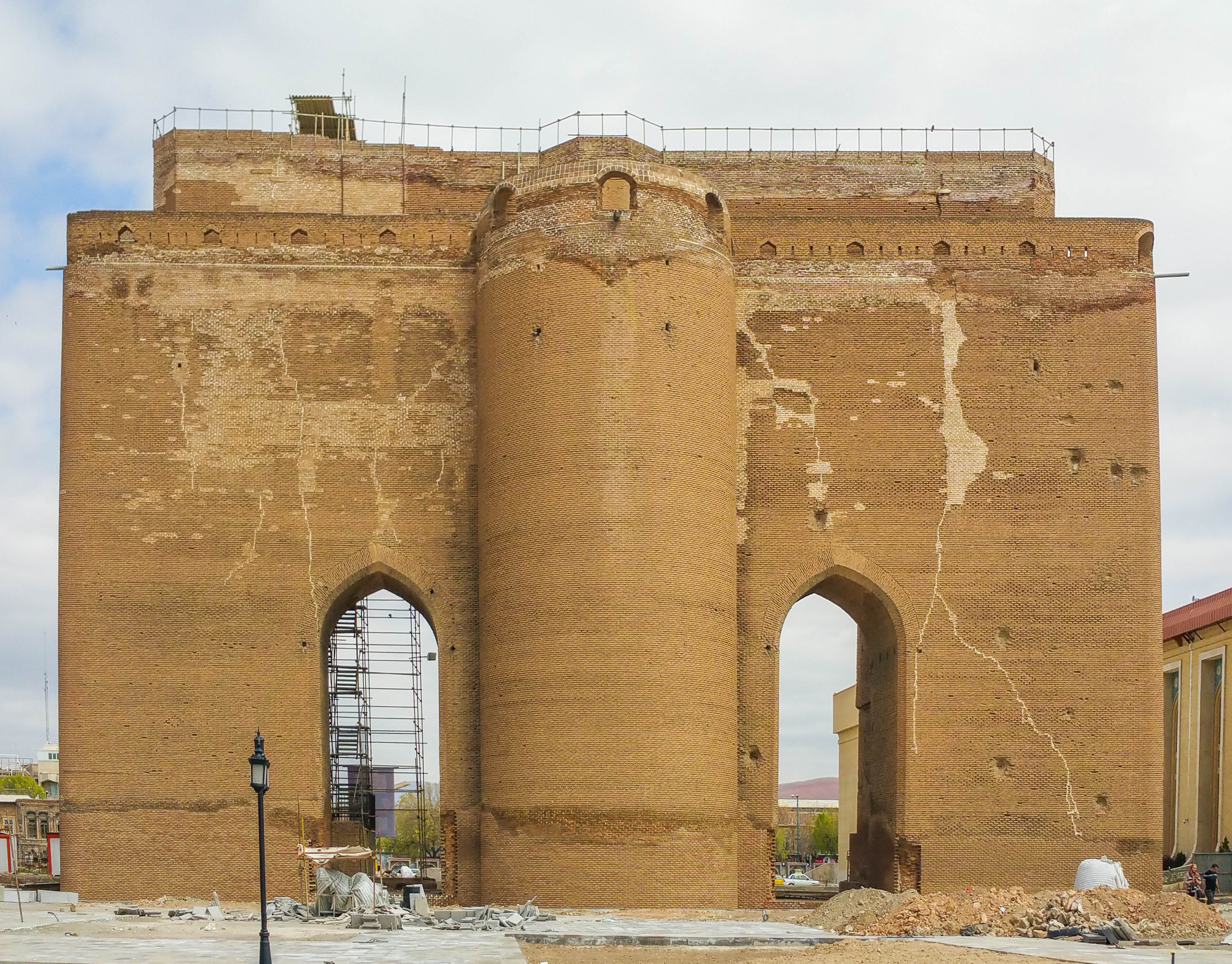
The Arg, the southern view.

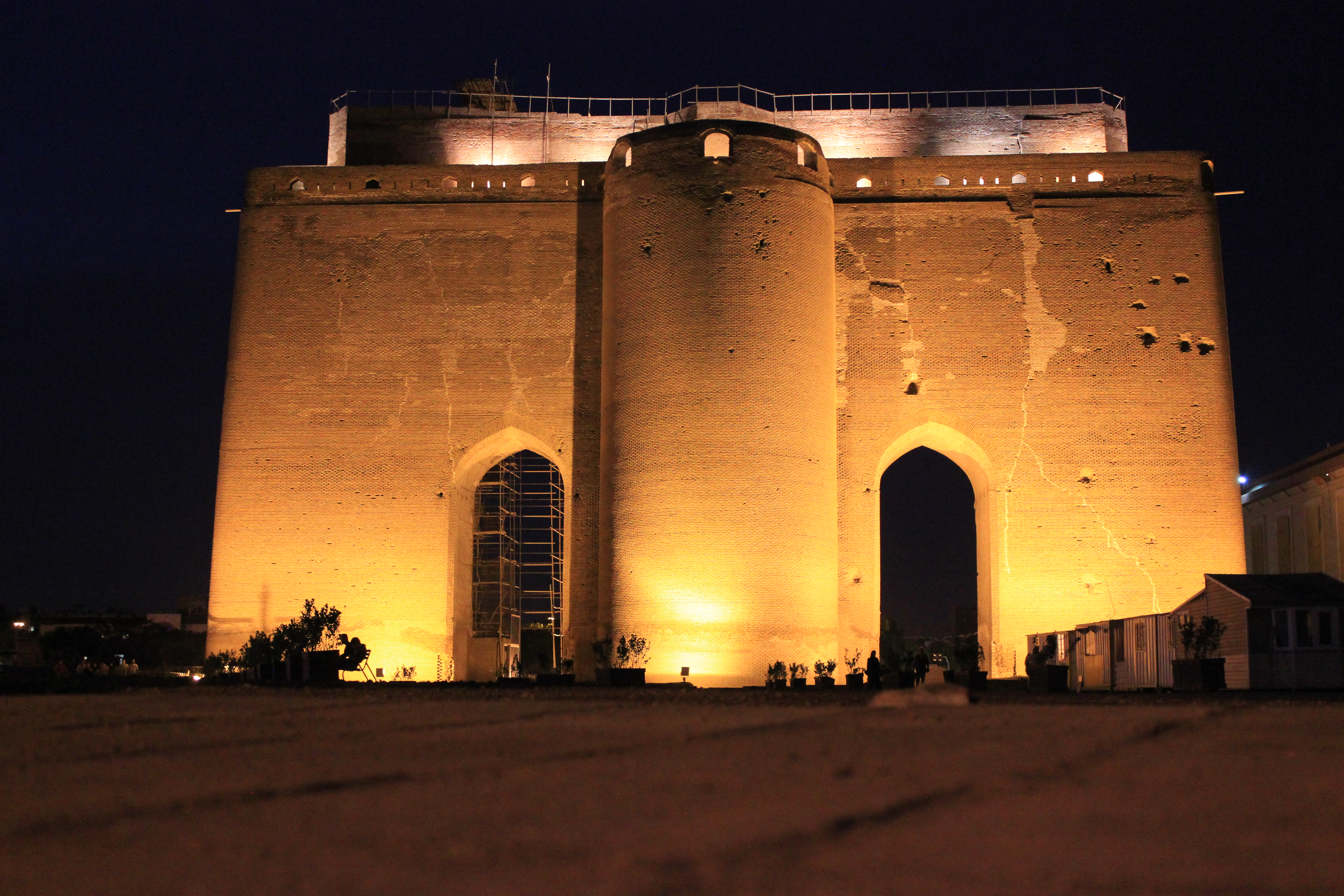
The Arg view at night, the southern view.

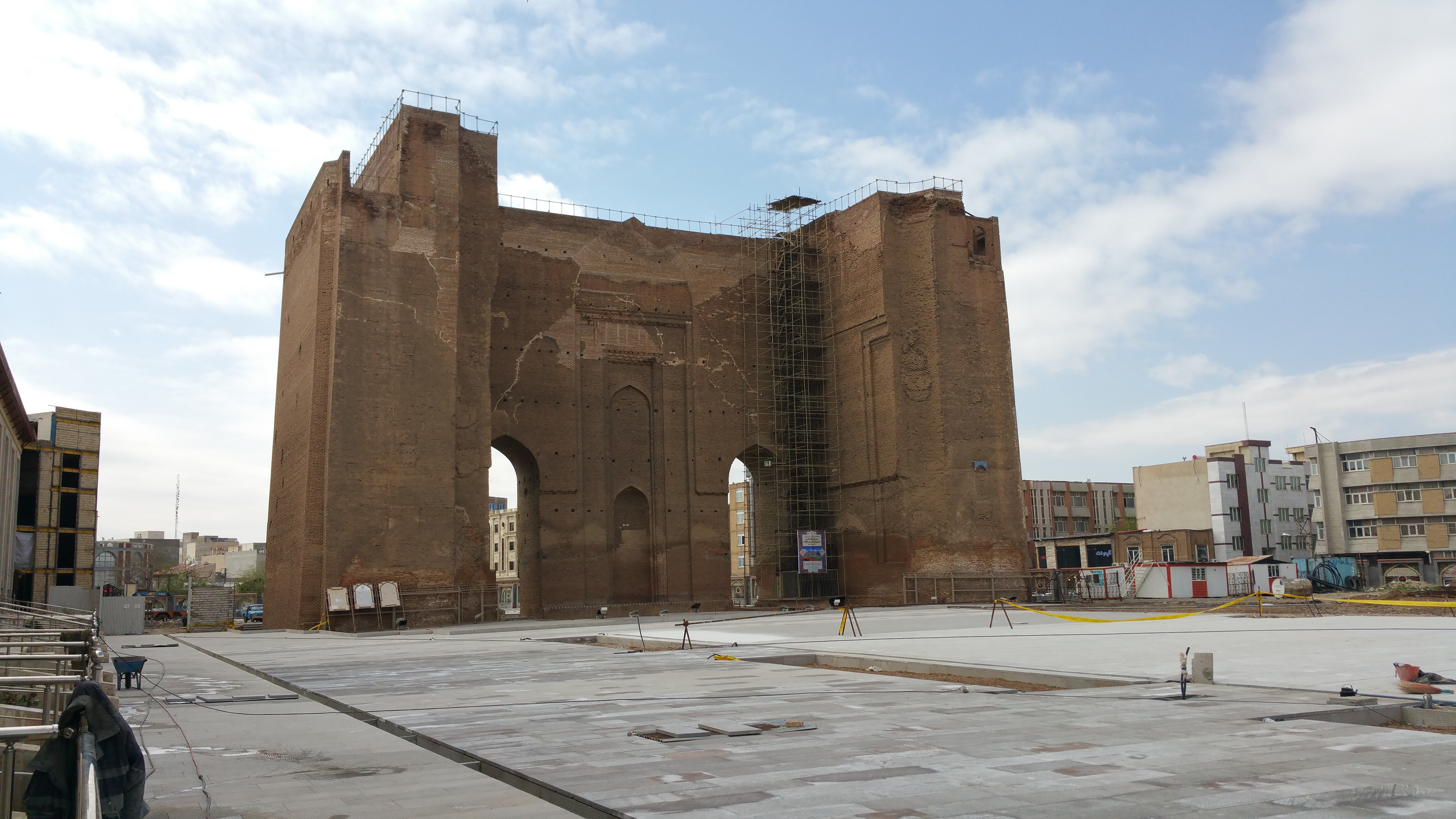
The Arg reconstruction, northern face.

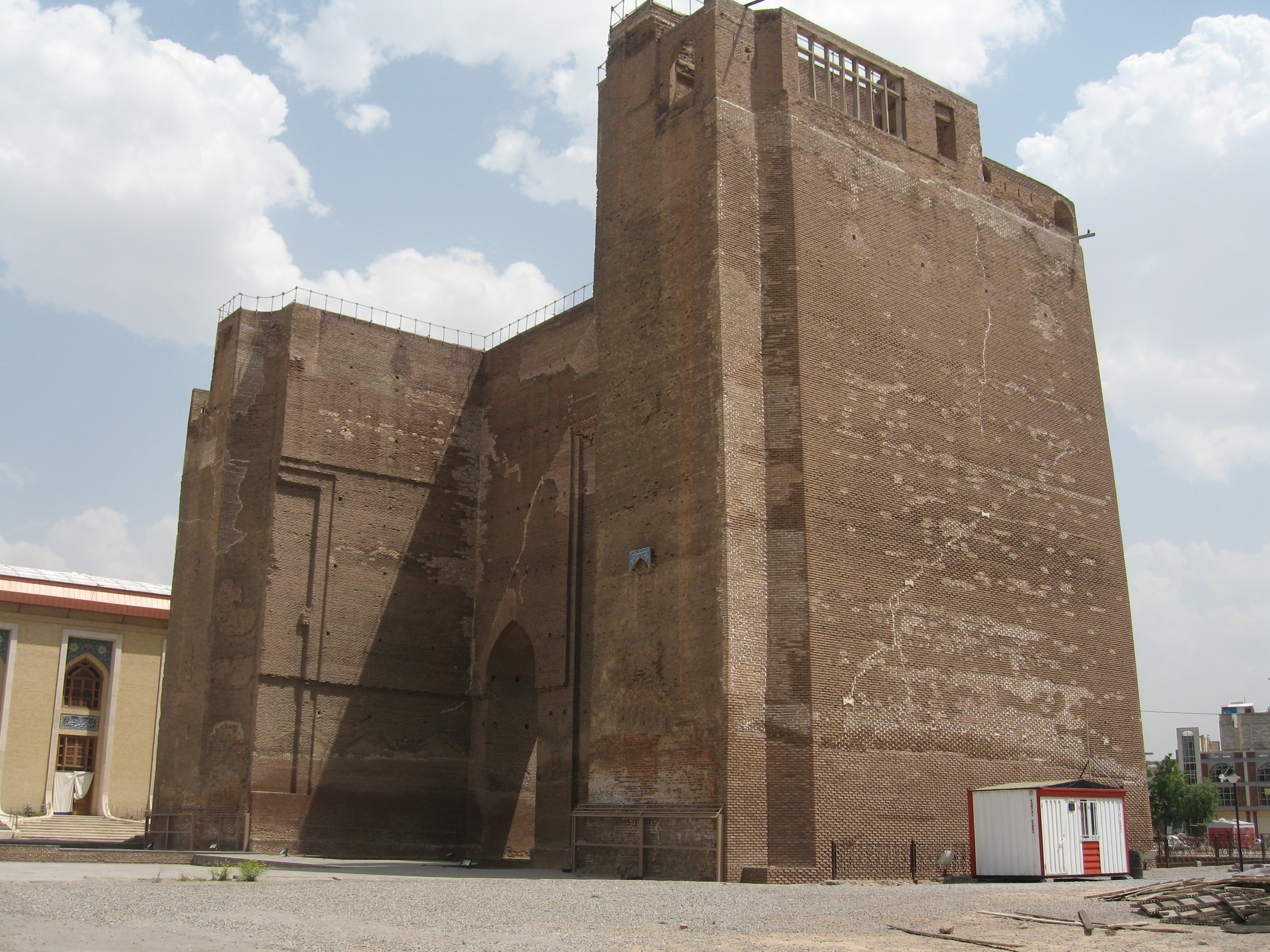

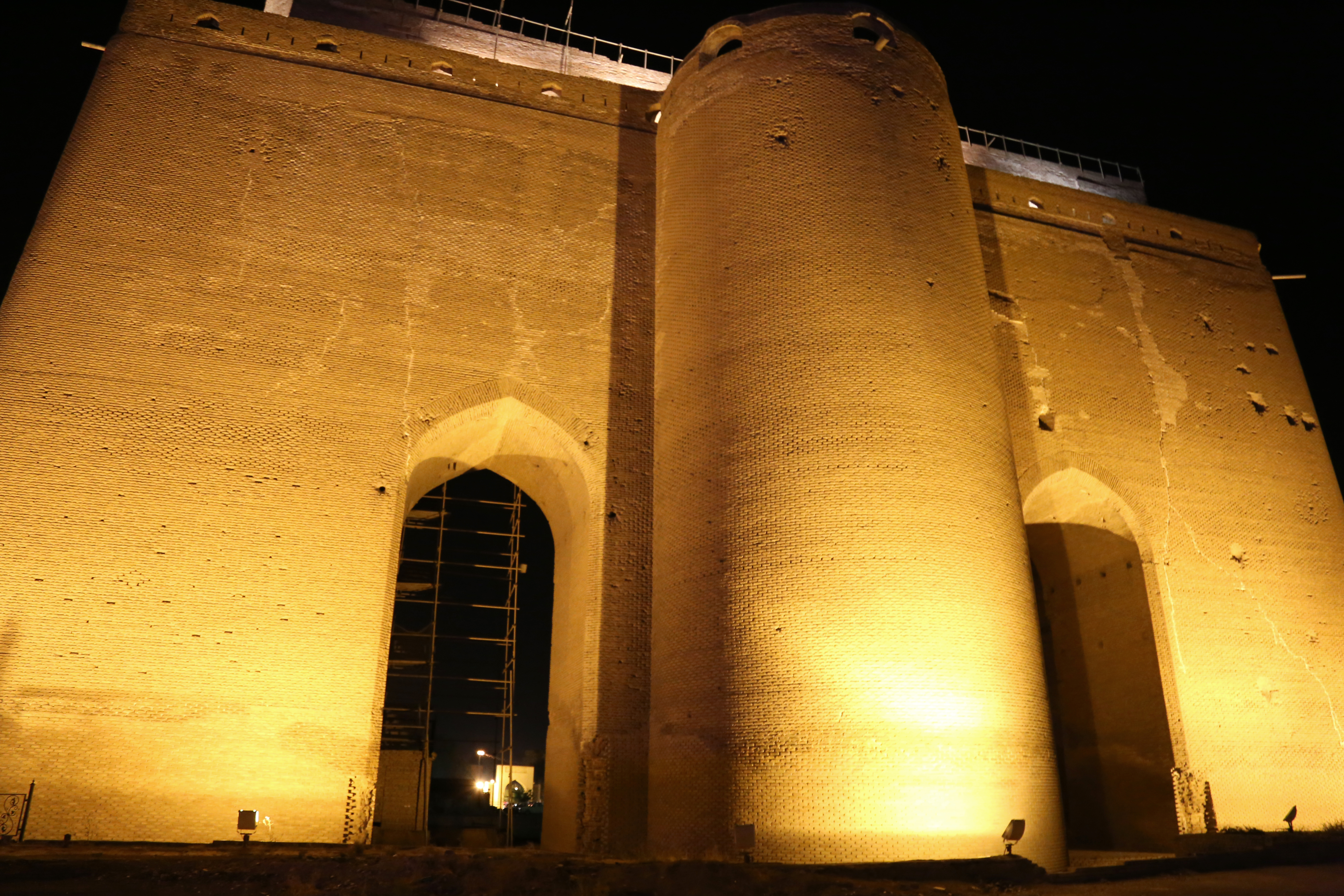

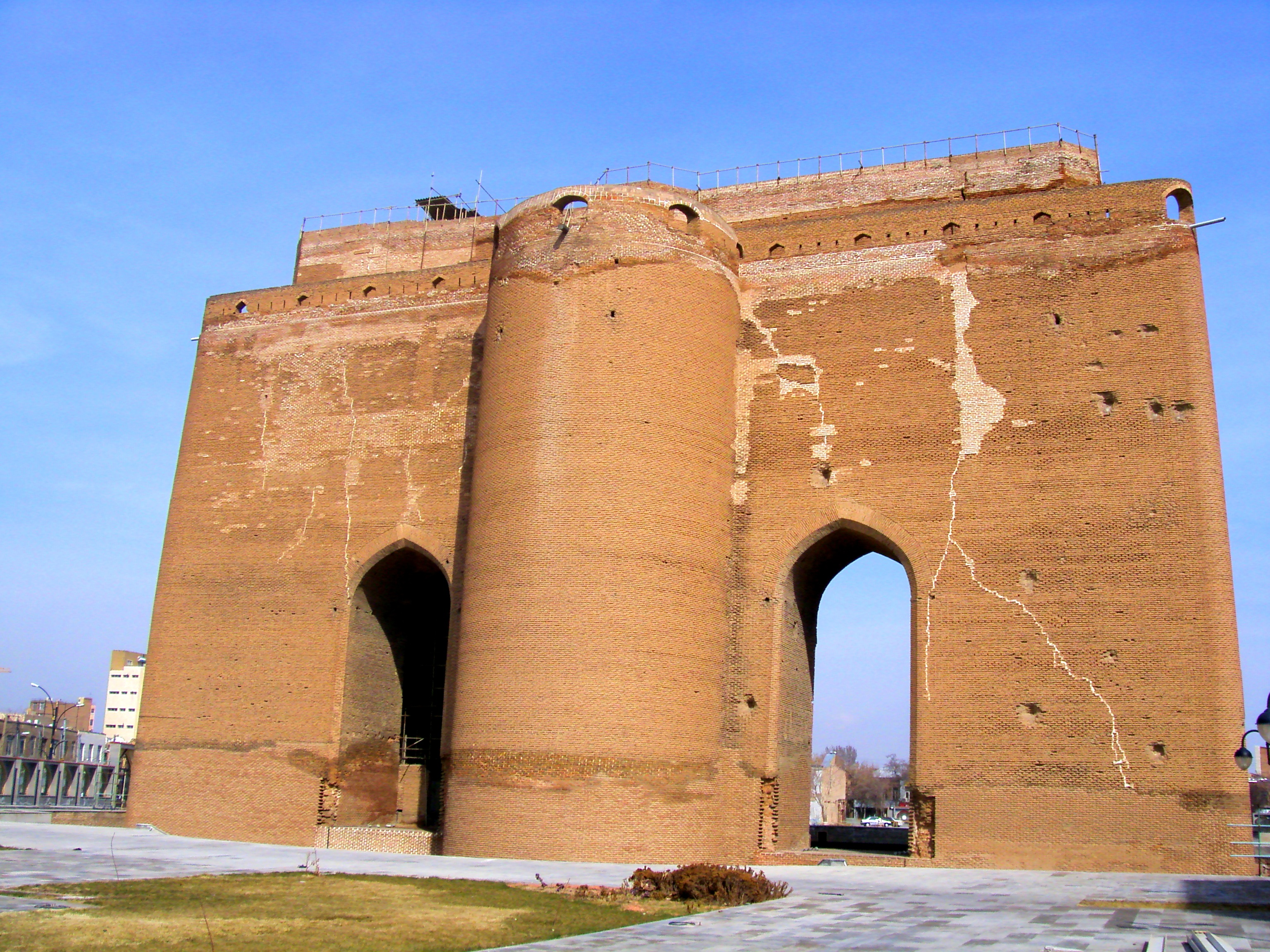

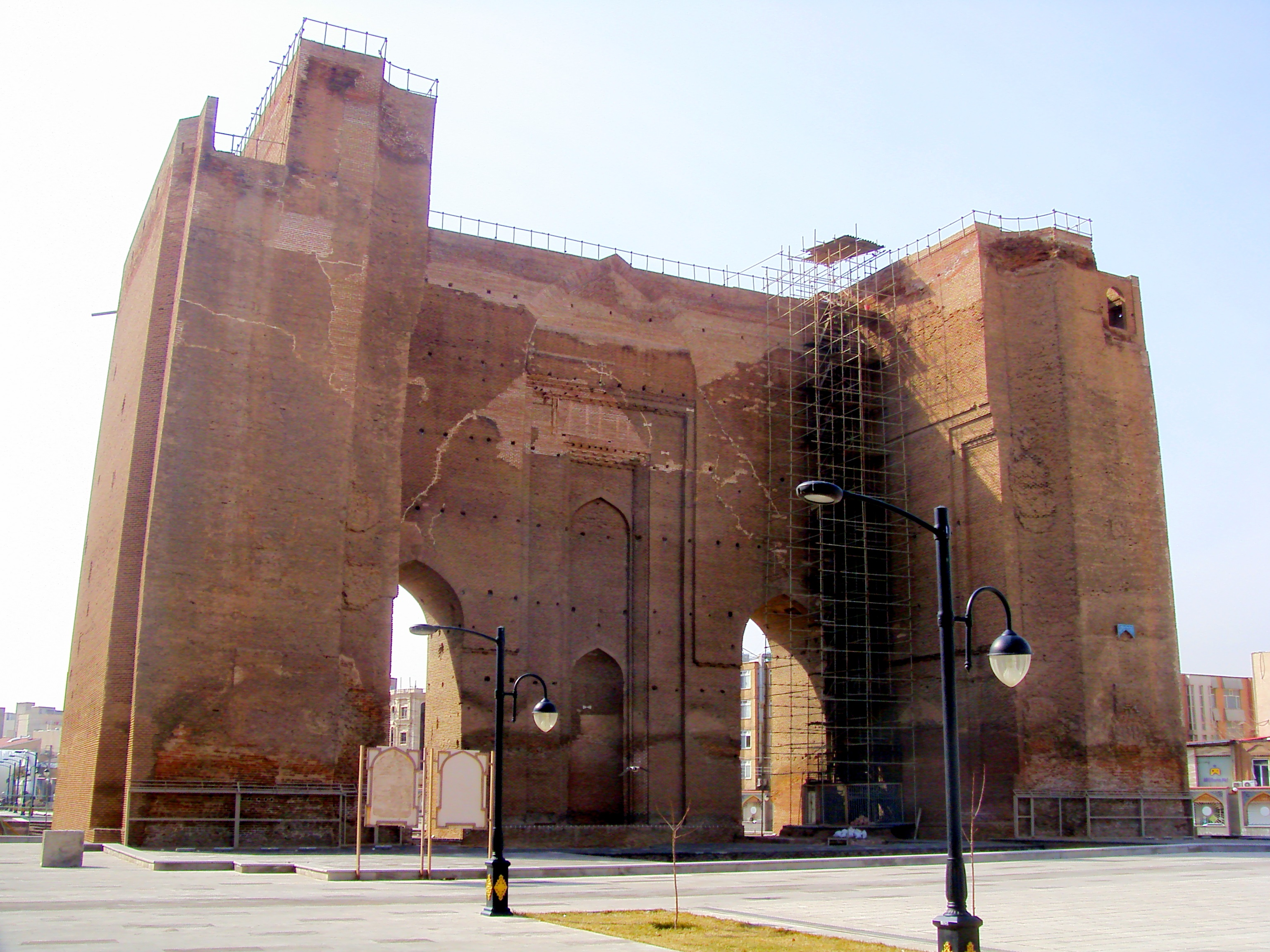

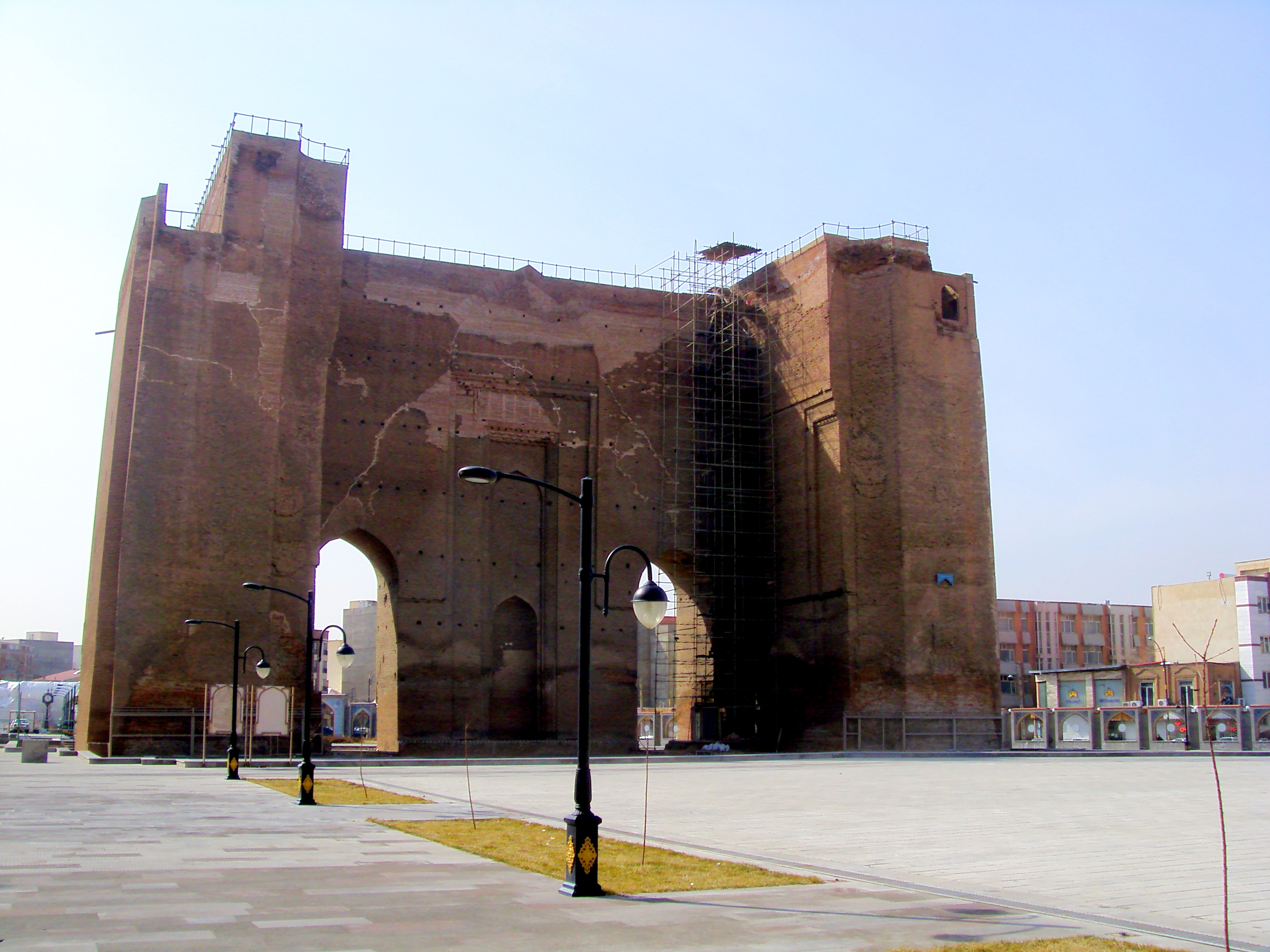
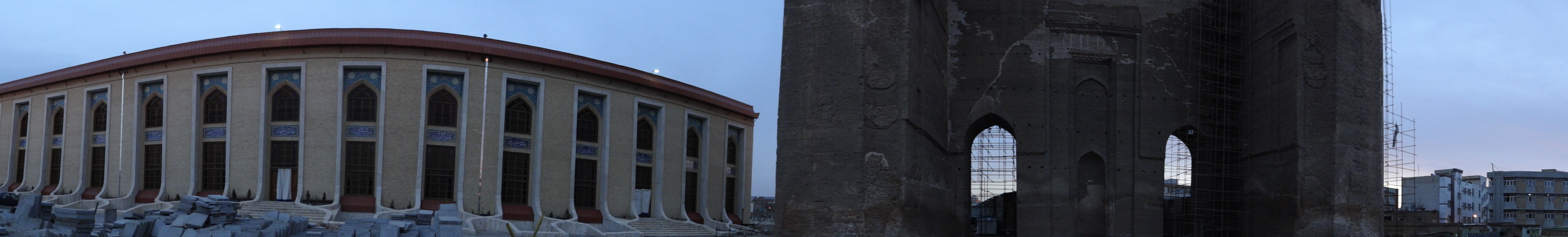
Construction of a new mosque in front of the Arg citadel, 2013

== See also ==
- Shia Islam in Iran
- List of mosques in Iran
- List of Iranian castles
- Iranian architecture
