= Mosque of Master and Student =

Shia Islam mosque in Tabriz, Iran

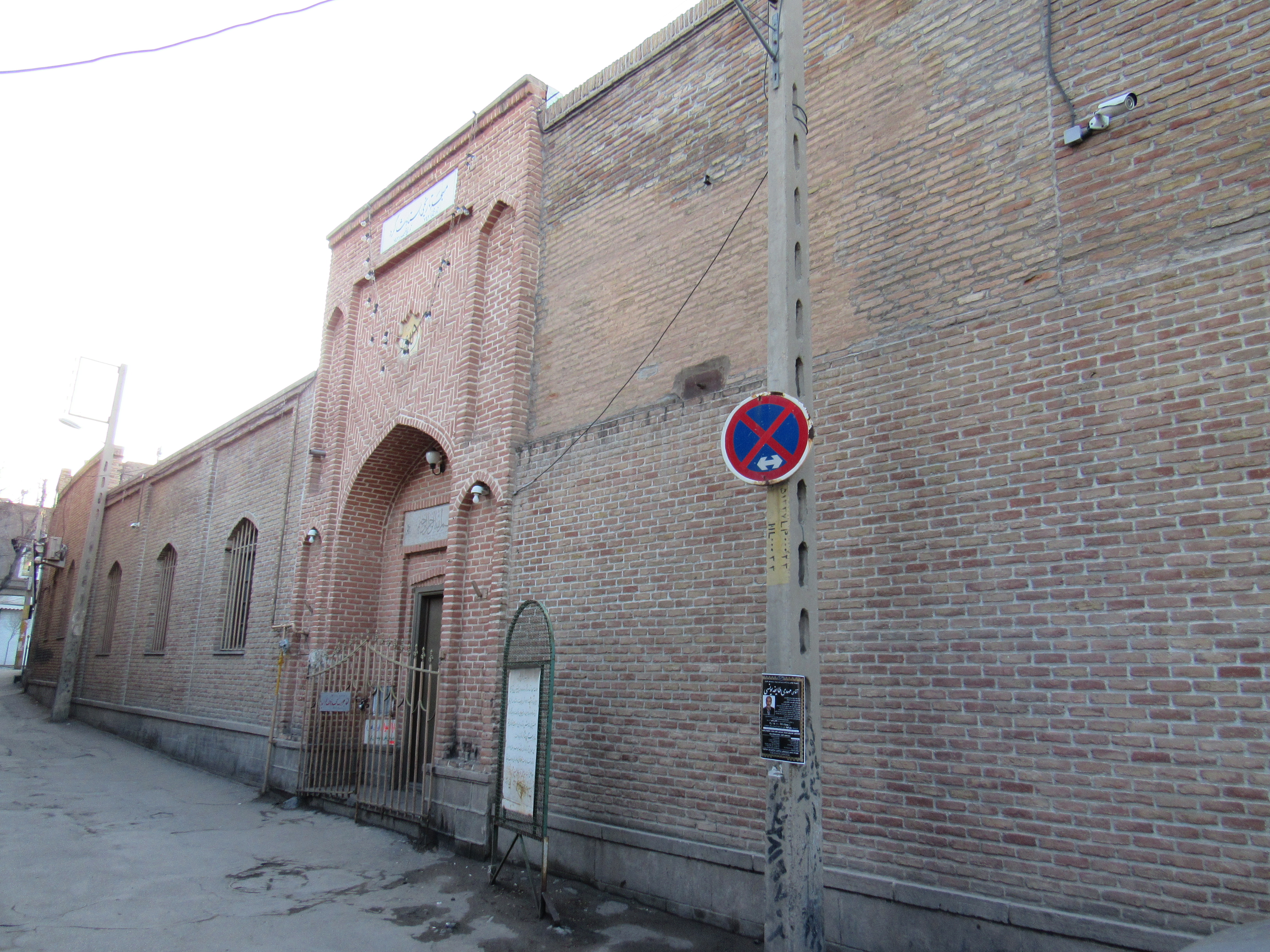
- The mosque entrance in 2017

- Location of the mosque in Iran

Religion
- Affiliation: Shia Islam
- Ecclesiastical or organisational status: Mosque
- Status: Active

Location
- Location: Tabriz, East Azerbaijan
- Country: Iran
- Coordinates: 38°04′37″N 46°17′26″E

Architecture
- Architects: ʿAbdallah Sayrafi; Hajji Muhammad Bandgir
- Type: Mosque architecture
- Founder: Hasan Kuchak
- Completed: 1340 CE; 1878 (reconstruction); 1920 (renovation); 1959 (renovation)
- Materials: Bricks

Iran National Heritage List
- Official name: Meydan Mosque
- Type: Built
- Designated: 19 August 1968
- Reference no.: 880
- Conservation organization: Cultural Heritage, Handicrafts and Tourism Organization of Iran

The Mosque of Master and Student (Persian: مسجد استاد و شاگرد, romanized: Masjed-e Ostād o Šāgerd; Arabic: مسجد أستاد وشاغرد), also known as the Meydan Mosque, is a Shi'ite mosque, located in the Mihad Mihin (Mirmiyan) neighborhood of Tabriz, in the province of East Azerbaijan, Iran. The mosque was completed in 1340 CE, during the Ilkhanate-Chobanid eras, and is situated at the intersection of Ferdowsi and Mohagheghi (Amin) streets.

The mosque was added to the Iran National Heritage List on 19 August 1968, administered by the Cultural Heritage, Handicrafts and Tourism Organization of Iran.

== History ==
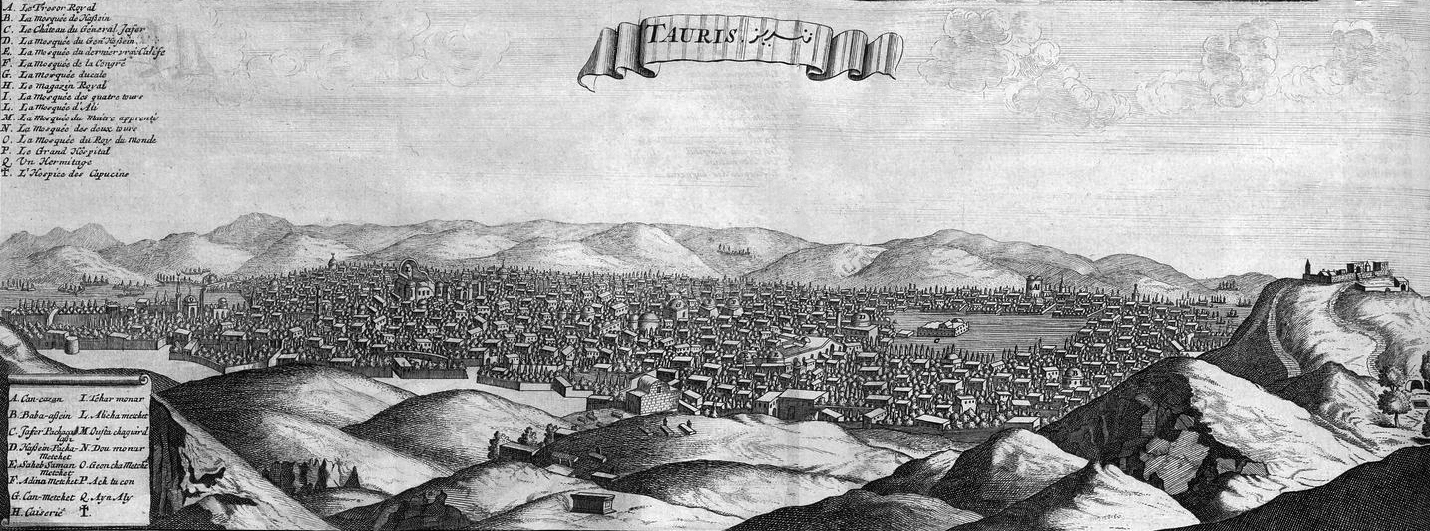
Mosque of Master and Student marked with letter M in Chardin's 1673 CE panoramic map of Tabriz

It takes its name from the fact calligrapher ‛Abdallah Sayrafi and his pupil Hajji Muhammad Bandgir worked both on the mosque. It was built during the reign of Suleiman Khan and was financed by Ala al-Din Hasan Kuchak. Due to these reasons, it is also called ʿAlāʾīya (Persian: علائیه) after Hasan or Solaymānīya (Persian: سلیمانیه) after Suleiman Khan.

The mosque was damaged several times due to numerous earthquakes in the area, especially during 1641 earthquake, and the original inscriptions were lost. Jean Chardin reported that the mosque was in semi-ruined situation when he visited. It was renovated on the orders of Abbas Mirza, later by Mirza Muhammad Qarajadaghi-Avansari in 1916 and finally Muhammad Agha Ardabili in 1959.

== See also ==
- Shia Islam in Iran
- List of mosques in Iran
