= Tabriz =

City in East Azerbaijan, Iran

Tabriz تبریز Tauris
- City
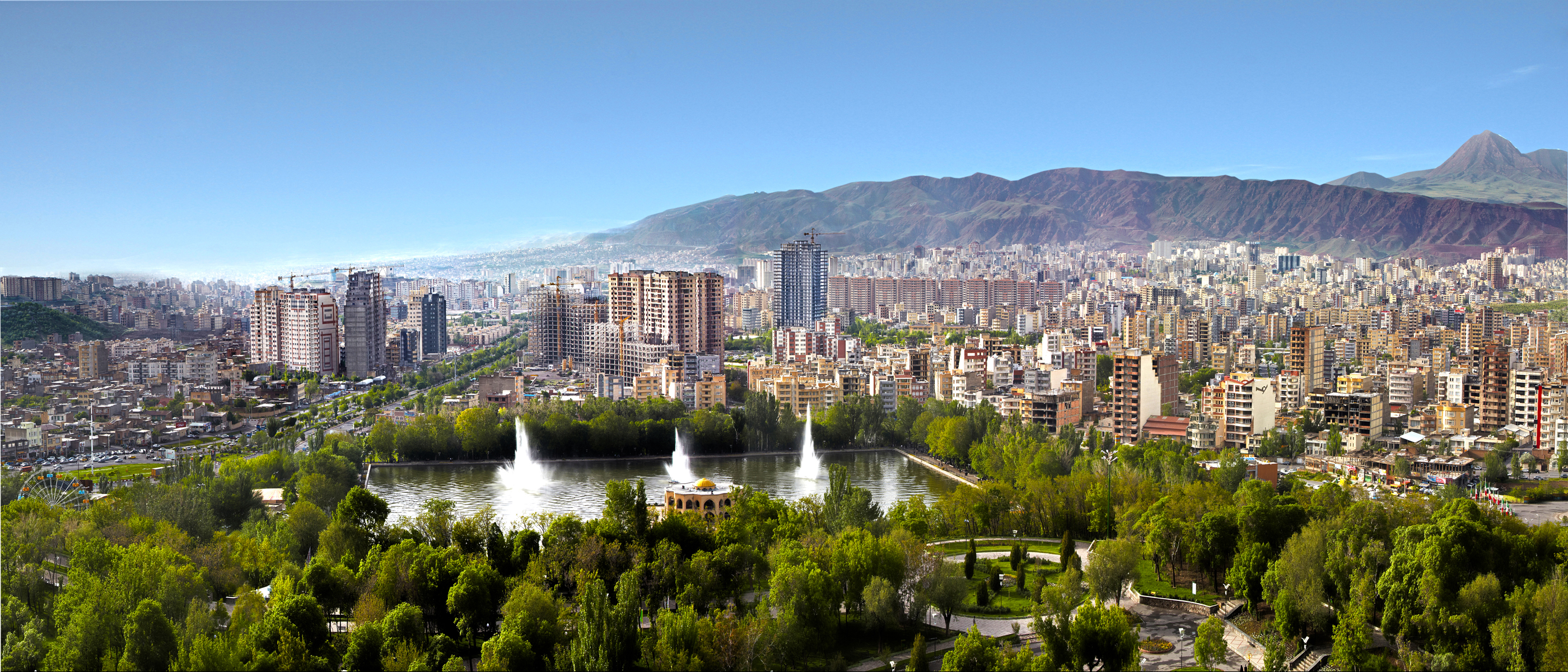
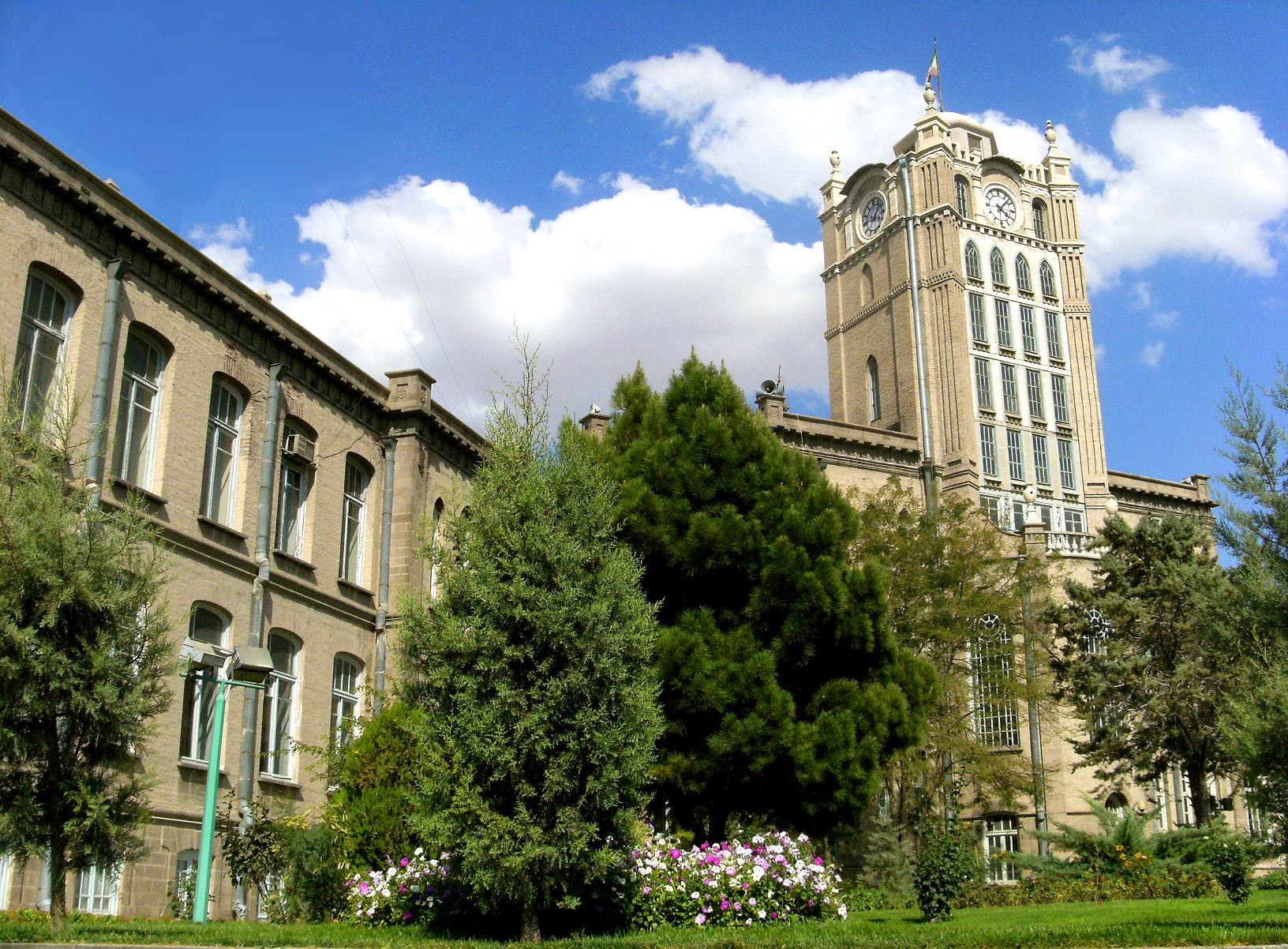
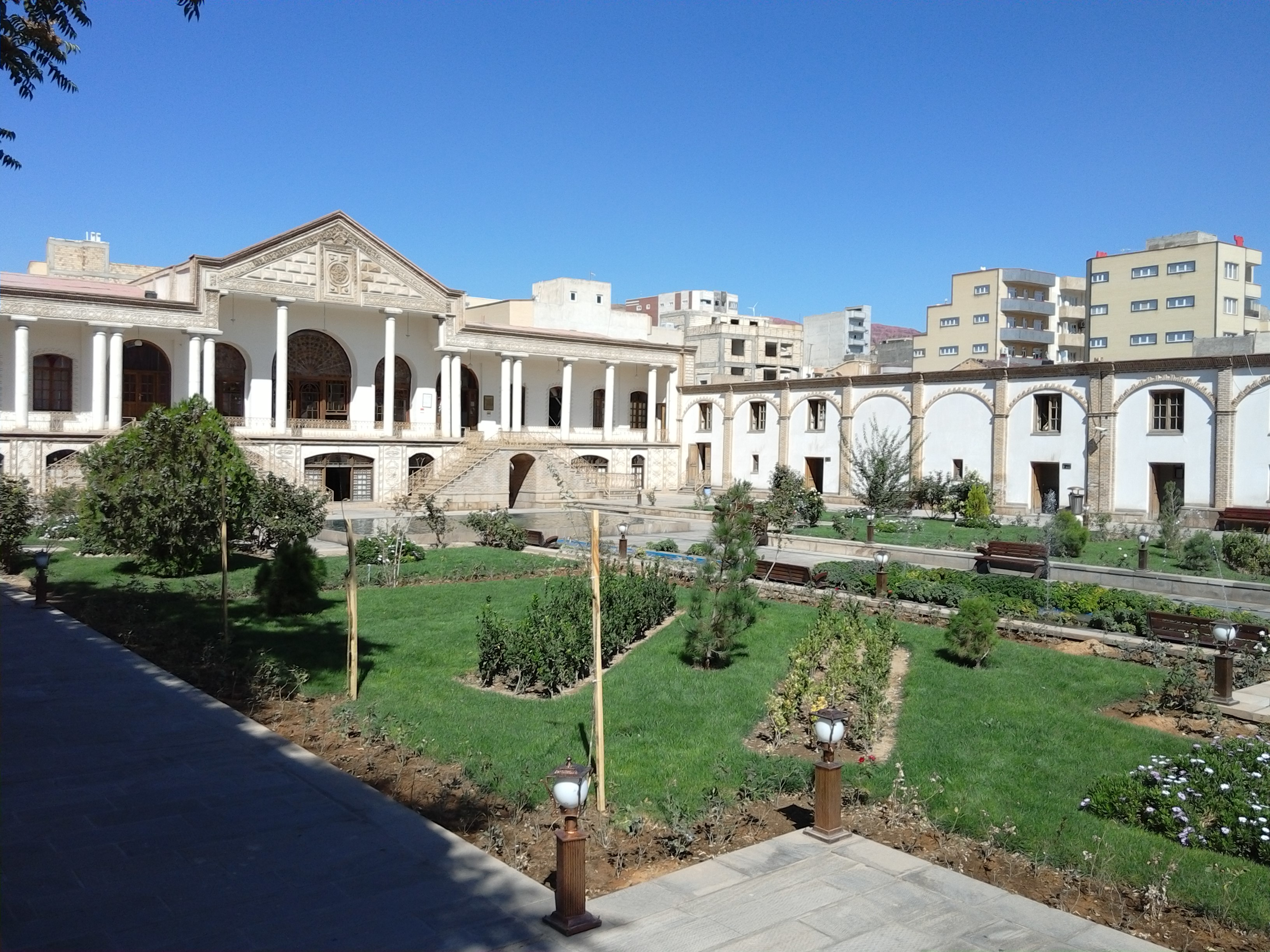
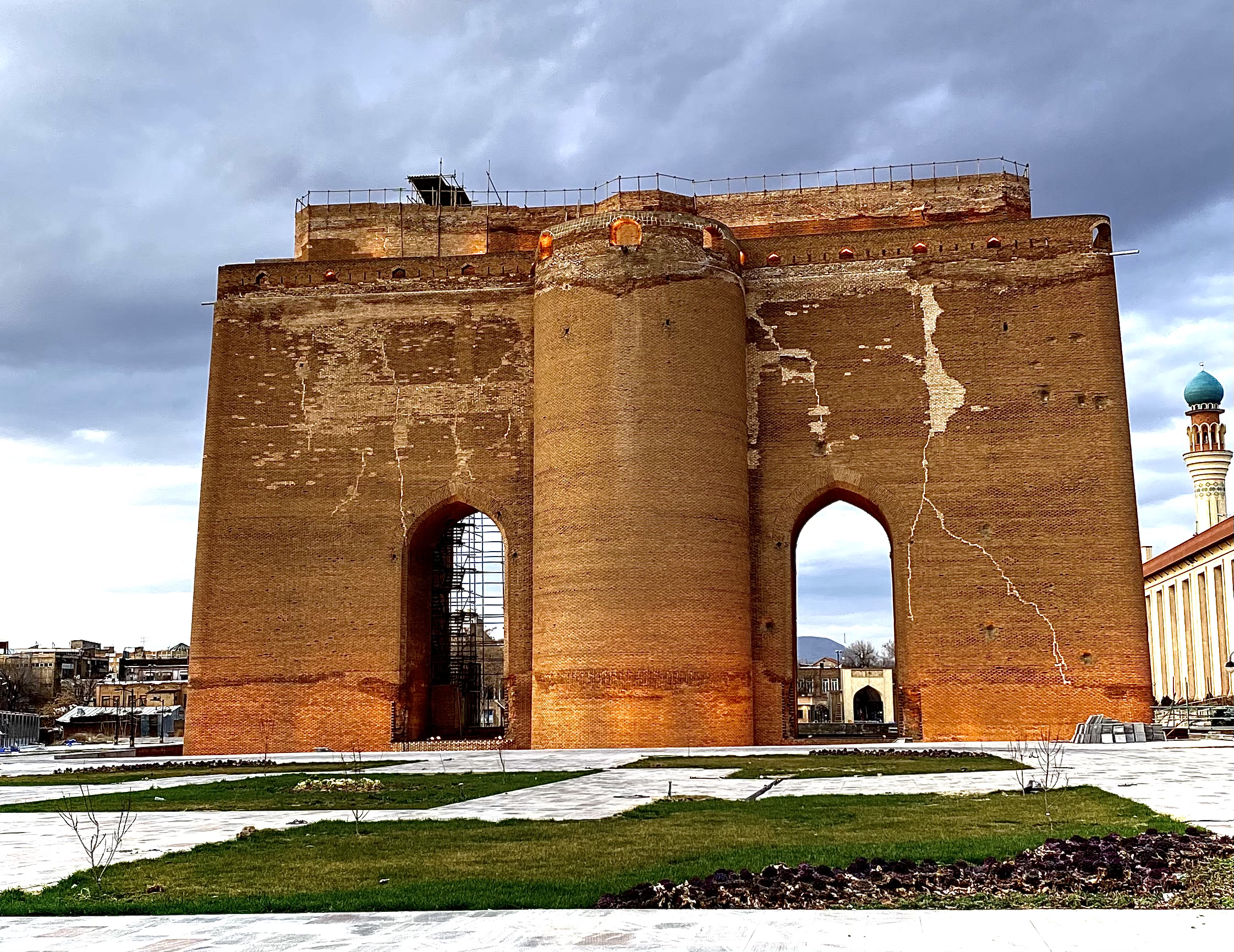
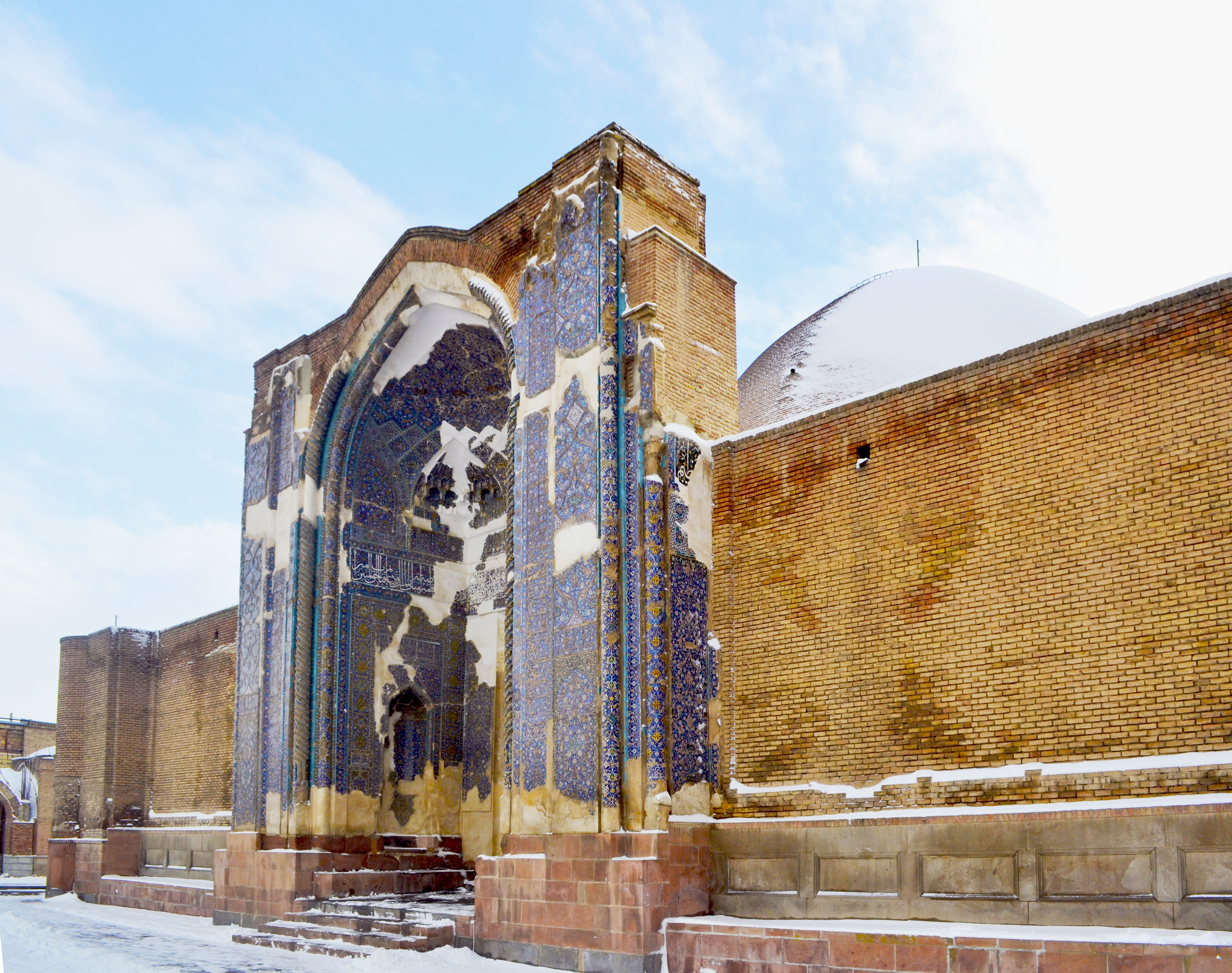
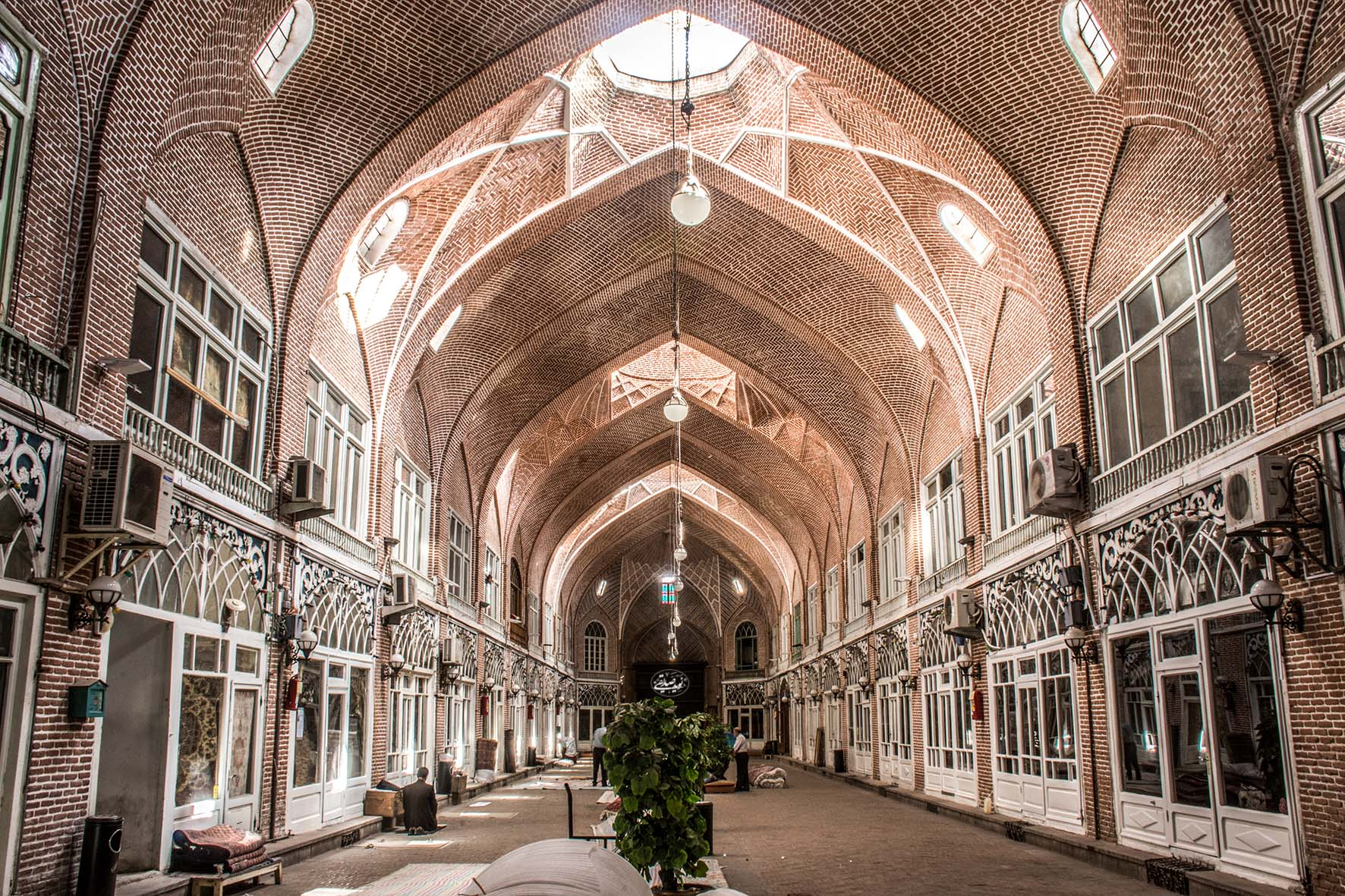
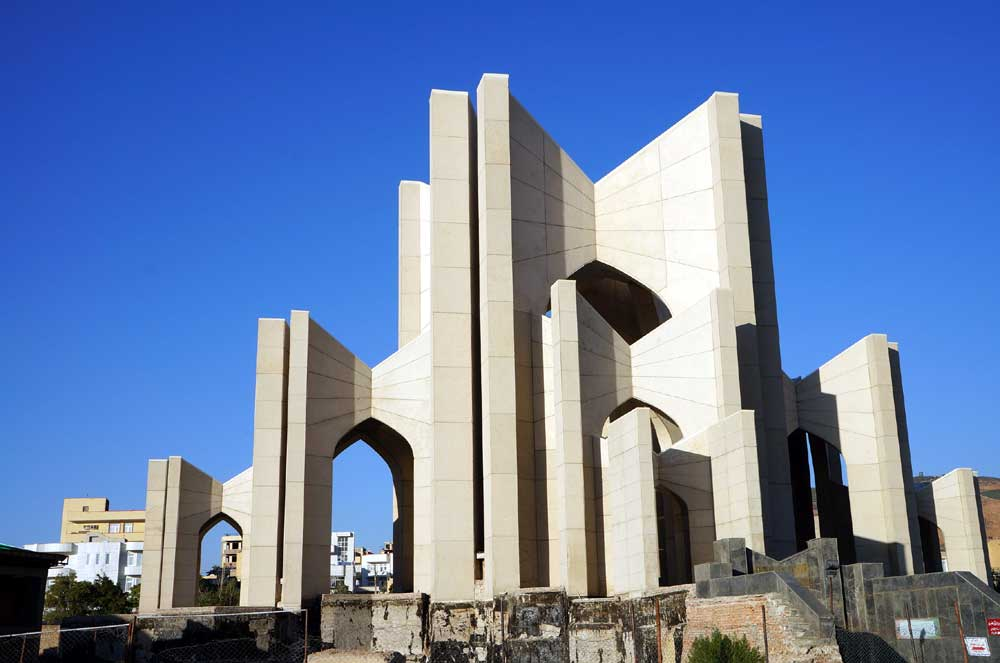
- Tabriz skyline Tabriz Municipality Palace Qajar Museum of Tabriz Arg of Tabriz Blue Mosque Bazaar of Tabriz Mausoleum of Poets

- Flag Seal
- Nickname: City of Firsts
- Location within Iran
- Coordinates: 38°04′N 46°18′E
- Country: Iran
- Region: 3
- Province: East Azerbaijan
- County: Tabriz
- District: Central

Government
  - Mayor: Yaghoub Houshyar
  - Chairman of City Council: Rasoul Bargi
  - Parliament: Alirezabeighi, Saei, Farhanghi, Bimegdar, Pezeshkian & Saeidi

Area
  - City: 325 km^{2} (125 sq mi)
  - Urban: 512 km^{2} (198 sq mi)
  - Metro: 1,500 km^{2} (580 sq mi)
- Elevation: 1,351.4 m (4,434 ft)

Population (2016)
  - Density: 12,000/km^{2} (31,000/sq mi)
  - Urban: 1,558,693
  - Metro: 1,773,023
  - Rank: 6th in Iran
- Demonyms: Tabrizian, Tabrizli, Tabrizi
- Time zone: UTC+3:30 (IRST)
- Postal code: 51368
- Area code: 041
- Website: tabriz.ir

Tabriz (Persian: تبریز, romanized: tabriz, pronounced [tæbˈɾiːz]) (Note: Azerbaijani: تبریز, romanized: Təbriz) is a city in the Central District of Tabriz County, in East Azerbaijan province of northwestern Iran. It serves as capital of the province, the county, and the district. It is the sixth-most-populous city in Iran.

The city of Tabriz lies close to the borders of Armenia and the Republic of Azerbaijan, 130 kilometers from the Armenia-Iran and Azerbaijan-Iran border.

Tabriz is in the Quru River valley in Iran's historic Azerbaijan region between long ridges of volcanic cones in the Sahand and Eynali mountains. Tabriz's elevation ranges between 1,350 and 1,600 m (4,430 and 5,250 ft) above sea level. The valley opens up into a plain that gently slopes down to the eastern shores of Lake Urmia, 60 km (37 mi) to the west. The city was named World Carpet Weaving City by the World Crafts Council in October 2015 and Exemplary Tourist City of 2018 by the Organisation of Islamic Cooperation.

With a population of over 1.7 million (2016), Tabriz is the largest economic hub and metropolitan area in northwest Iran. The population is bilingual with most people speaking Iranian Azerbaijani as their native language and Persian as their second language. Tabriz is a major heavy industries hub for automobiles, machine tools, refineries, petrochemicals, textiles and cement production industries. The city is famous for its handicrafts, including hand-woven rugs and jewelry. Local confectionery, chocolate, dried nuts and traditional Tabrizi food are recognized throughout Iran as some of the best. Some of the most esteemed cultural institutions in northwest Iran are located in Tabriz, which is also a center for intellectual activity.

Tabriz contains many historical monuments. Most of Tabriz's preserved historical sites belong to Ilkhanid, Safavid and Qajar. Among these sites is the grand Bazaar of Tabriz, which is designated a World Heritage Site. From the early modern era, Tabriz was pivotal in the development of three neighboring regions - the Caucasus, Eastern Anatolia and Central Iran. As the country's closest hub to Europe, many aspects of early modernization in Iran began in Tabriz. The Qajar dynasty was forced to cede the Caucasian territories to Imperial Russia following the two Russo-Persian Wars in the first half of the 19th century. Until 1925, the city was the traditional residence of the Qajar crown princes.

== Etymology ==
According to some sources, including Encyclopædia Britannica, the name Tabriz derives from tap-riz, meaning "flowing hot", in reference to the area's many thermal springs.

Other sources claim that in AD 246, to avenge his brother's death, king Tiridates II of Armenia repelled Ardashir I of the Sassanid Empire and changed the name of the city from Shahistan to Tauris, deriving from Classical Armenian ta-vrezh "this revenge". In AD 297, it became the capital of Tiridates III, king of Armenia. However, this story is based on accounts of Vardan Areveltsi, a 13th-century Armenian historian; no ancient source records such an event. The historical Armenian name for the city was Tavrezh (Armenian: Թաւրէժ, romanized: T'avrēž).

The Cambridge History of Iran points to a connection between the "ancient stronghold of Tarui-Tarmakisa" (or Tarwi-Tarwakisa), which existed in the 8th century BC, and the city of Tabriz; Ernst Emil Herzfeld's Archaeological History of Iran directly equates Tarwakisa with Tabriz (cf Proto-Iranian tr̥Hwáns "able to overcome"). However, some researchers believe that Tabriz may be considered a pre-Iranian toponym.

== History ==
=== Early history ===
The early history of Tabriz is not well documented. The earliest evidence is an Iron Age grave yard of 1st millennium B.C. unearthed in the late 1990s on the northern side of Blue Mosque. The city also inscribed as old as 714 B.C. on as Tarui or Tauris, on the Assyrian King Sargon II's epigraph in 714 B.C.

Egyptologist David Rohl suggested that the legendary Garden of Eden was near Tabriz. Archaeologist Eric H. Cline commented on Rohl's views, writing that "his suggestions have not caught on with the scholarly establishment. His argument is not helped by the fact that it depends upon speculations regarding the transmission of place-names for both the various rivers and nearby related areas from antiquity to the present. In the end, while Rohl's suggestion is not out of the question, it seems no more probable than any other hypothesis, and less likely than those suggested by Speiser, Zarins, and Sauer."

Tabriz was chosen as the capital for several rulers commencing from Atropates era and his dynasty. The city was destroyed multiple times by natural disasters and invading armies. The earliest elements of the present Tabriz are claimed to be built either at the time of the early Sassanids in the 3rd or 4th century AD, or later in the 7th century. The city used to be called T'awrēš in Middle Persian.

=== Middle Ages ===
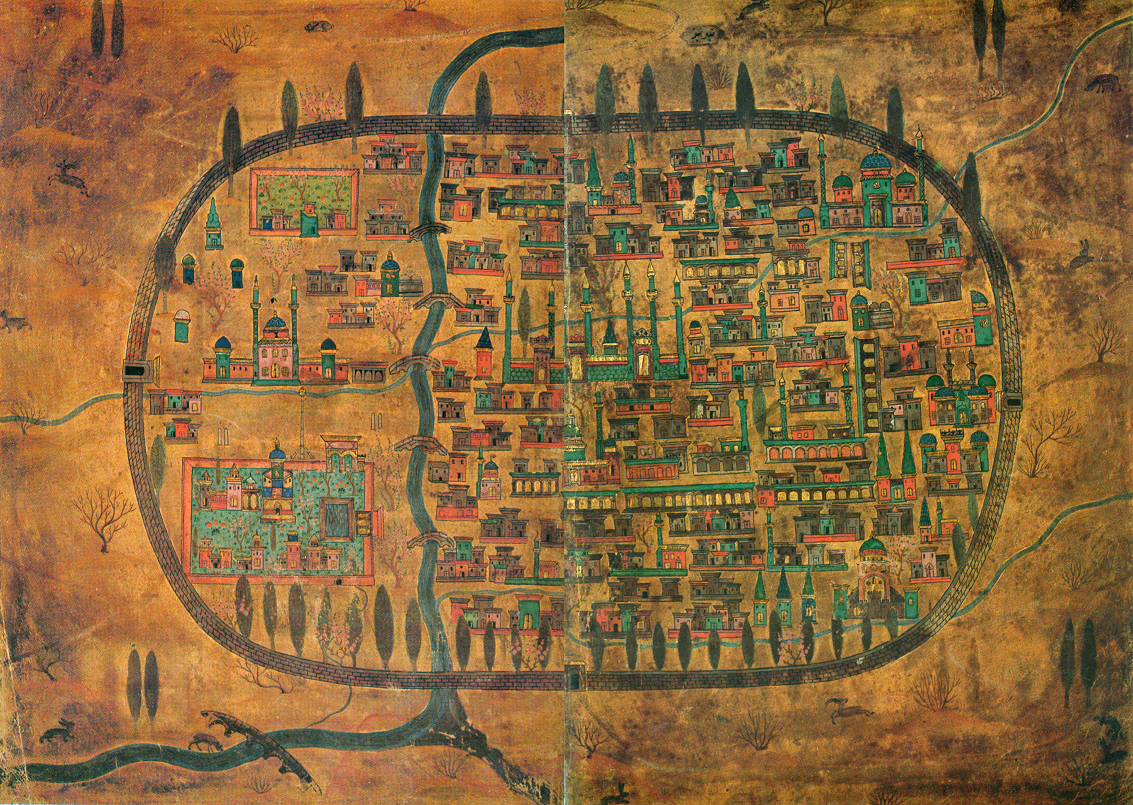
16th-century schematic map of Tabriz by Matrakçı Nasuh

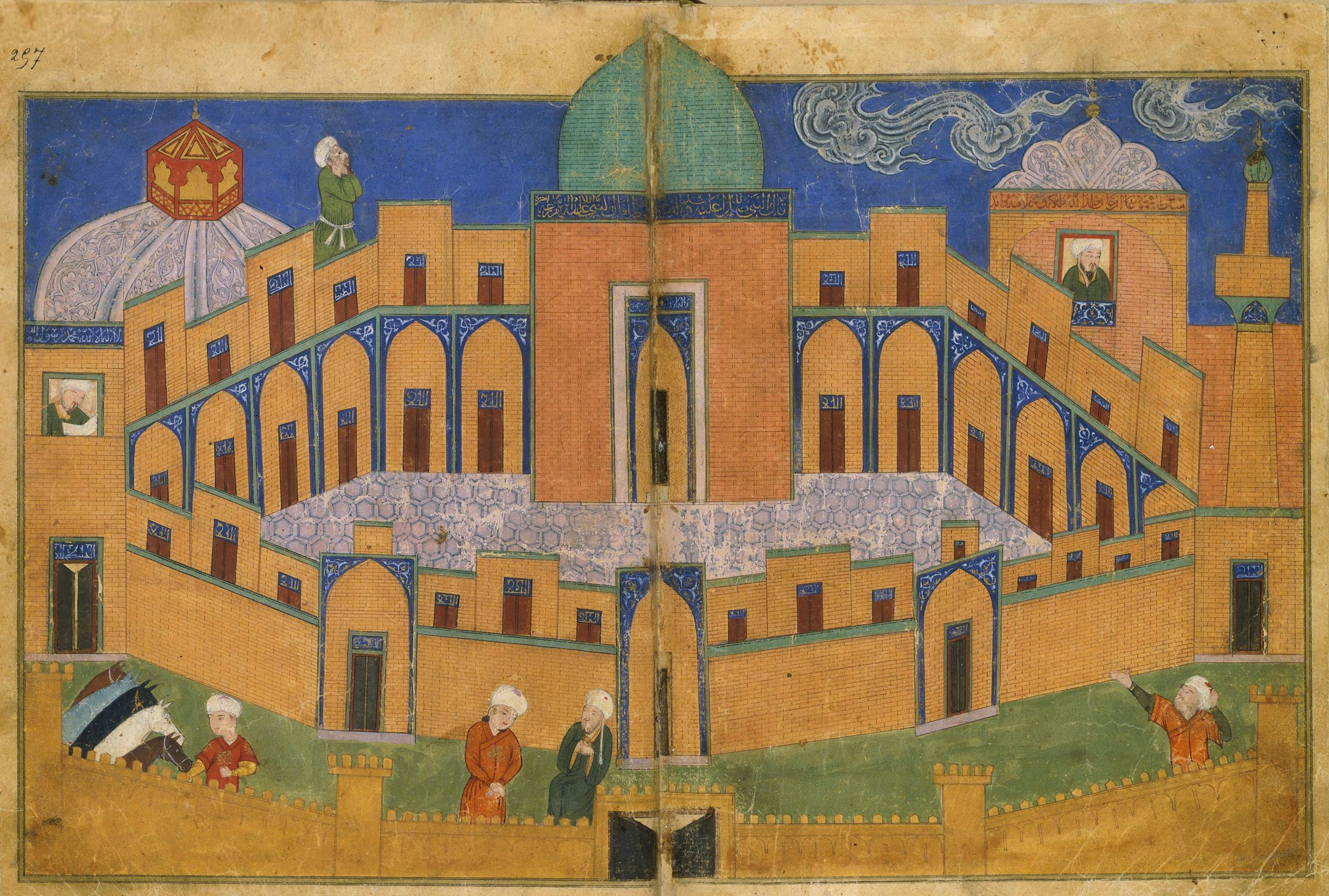
Ghazan Mausoleum, built c. 1300 by Ghazan in Tabriz

After the Muslim conquest of Iran, the Arabian Azd tribe from Yemen resided in Tabriz. The development of post-Islamic Tabriz began as of this time. The Islamic geographer Yaqut al-Hamawi says that Tabriz was a village before Rawwad from the tribe of Azd arrived at Tabriz. In 791 AD, Zubaidah, the wife of Abbasid caliph Harun al-Rashid, rebuilt Tabriz after a devastating earthquake and beautified the city to the point where she was credited for having been its founder.

In the 10th century, Ardabil briefly held the status of Azarbayjan's capital, only to be swiftly supplanted by Tabriz, situated 130 miles to the west. Tabriz swiftly rose to prominence as a pivotal commercial hub, facilitating trade between the Far East, Central Asia, and vital routes. It served as a nexus linking Mesopotamia, the Mediterranean, Anatolia, Constantinople, and extending northward through the Caucasus to Ukraine, Crimea, and Eastern Europe.

In the Ramadan of 1208, Tabriz, as well as its adjacent cities and territories were conquered by the Kingdom of Georgia under Tamar the Great, as a response to the massacre of 12,000 Christians in the Georgian-controlled city of Ani on Easter day by Muslims. In nearby Ardebil, conquered by the Georgians as well, as many as 12,000 Muslims were killed. The Georgians then pushed further, taking Khoy and Qazvin along the way. Nevertheless, the city recovered soon and many western expediters who visited Tabriz in the 13th century on their way to the east were amazed by the richness of the city, its magnificent buildings and its institutions. Marco Polo, who passed Tabriz around 1275 while travelling on the Silk Road, described it as: "a great city surrounded by beautiful and pleasant gardens. It is excellently situated so the goods brought to here coming from many regions. Latin merchants specially Genevis go there to buy the goods that come from foreign lands."

Chosen as a capital by Abaqa Khan, fourth ruler of the Ilkhanate, for its favored location in the northwestern grasslands, in 1295, his successor Ghazan Khan made it the chief administrative centre of an empire stretching from Anatolia to the Oxus River and from the Caucasus to the Indian Ocean. Under his rule, new walls were built around the city, and numerous public buildings, educational facilities, and caravansarais were erected to serve traders travelling on the ancient Silk Road. The Byzantine Gregory Chioniades is said to have served as the city's Orthodox bishop during this time. At the same time, the Dominican Order established a Latin mission in Tabriz, which would become its own diocese under the archdiocese of Soltaniyeh for some decades in the 14th century.

From 1375 to 1468, Tabriz was the capital of Qara Qoyunlu state in Azerbaijan, until defeat of Qara Qoyunlu ruler, Jahan Shah by Ag Qoyunlu warriors. Ag Qoyunlus selected Tabriz as their capital from 1469 to 1501. Some of the existing historical monuments including the Blue Mosque belong to the Qara Qoyunlu period. Tabriz was sacked by Timur in 1392, and he invested his son, Miranshah, as governor of the city.

=== Early modern period ===
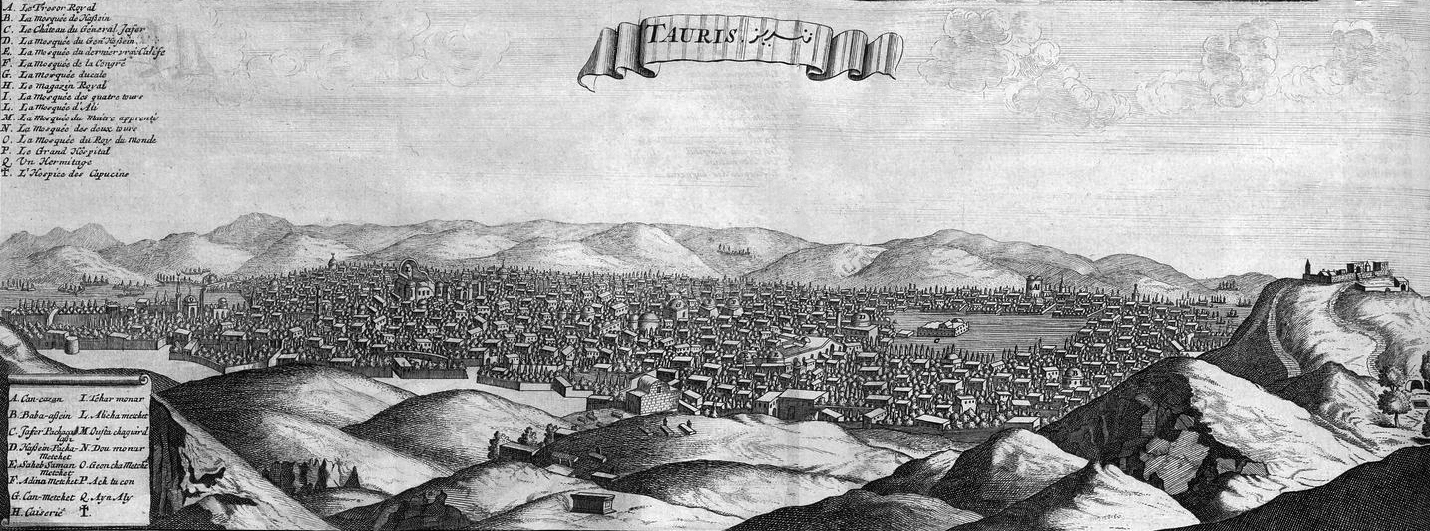
Panoramic view of Tabriz sketched by Jean Chardin, 1673

In 1501, Ismail I entered Tabriz and proclaimed it the capital of his Safavid state. In 1514, after the Battle of Chaldiran, Tabriz was sacked by Selim I. On 16 July 1534, prior to Ottoman conquest of Baghdad, Pargalı Ibrahim Pasha occupied Tabriz. In 1555, Tahmasp I transferred its capital to Qazvin to avoid the growing threat of the Ottoman army to his capital.

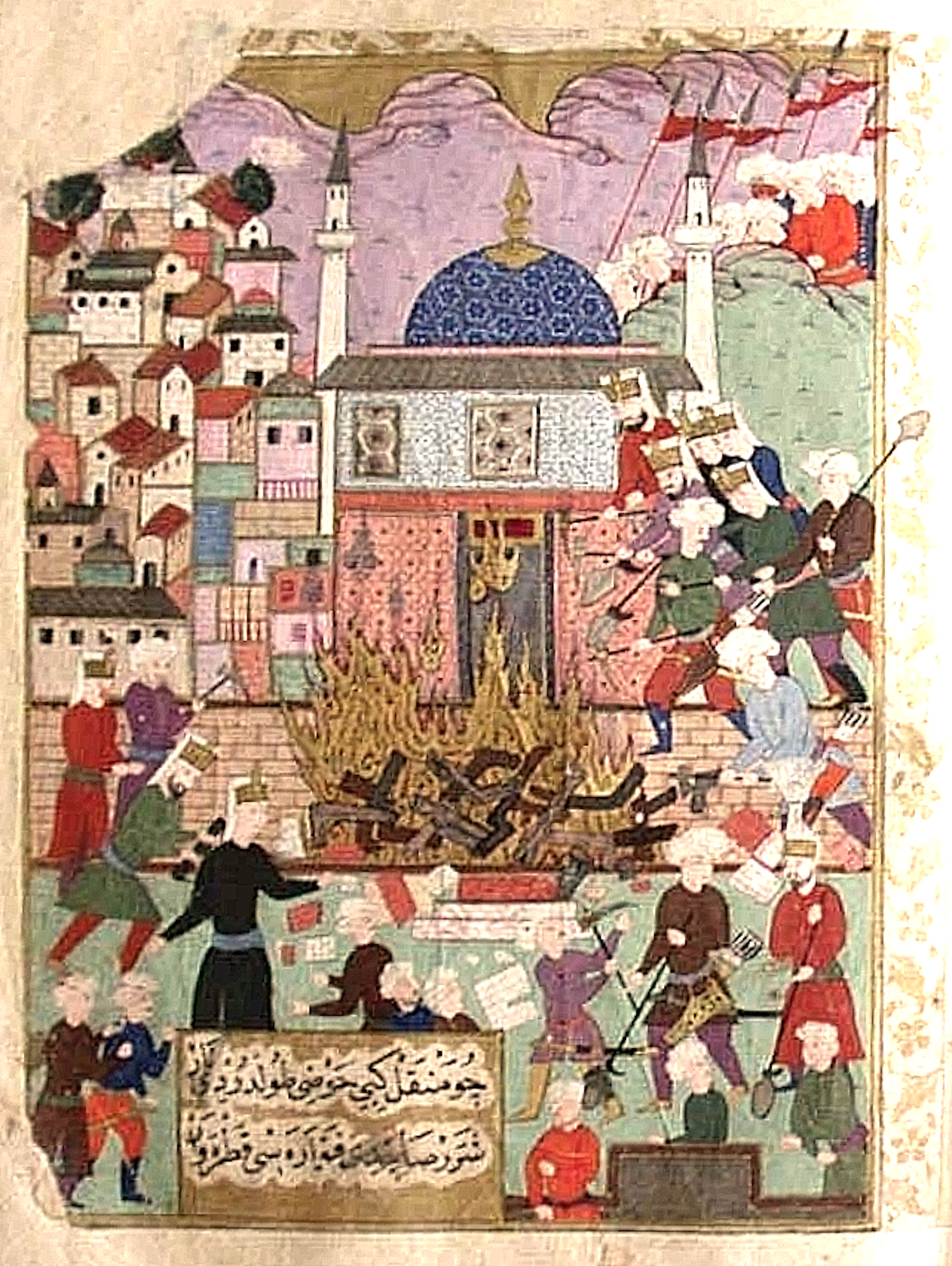
Ottoman capture of Tabriz in 1618 under Halil Pasha. Şehname-i Nadiri (Nadiri's book of kings) (1620s)

Between 1585 and 1603, Tabriz was under occupation by Ottomans, as a consequence of the Ottoman–Safavid War (1578–1590). After it was retaken by the Safavids under Abbas the Great, the city grew as a major commerce centre, conducting trade with the Ottoman Empire, Russia, and the Caucasus. Tabriz was occupied and sacked by Ottoman Murad IV in 1635, during the Ottoman–Safavid War (1623–39), before being returned to Iran in the Treaty of Zohab in 1639. The city was completely devastated by a strong earthquake in 1641. The Capuchins founded a small house in the city around 1656.

In summer of 1721, a large earthquake shocked Tabriz, killing about eighty thousand of its residents. The devastation continued in 1724–1725, when the city was invaded by an Ottoman army. During this round of invasion, the Ottomans imprisoned many in Tabriz and killed about two hundred thousand residents. The city was subsequently retaken by the Iranian army, after which a widespread famine, combined with the spread of fatal diseases, killed more of those who still remained. In addition, another earthquake is disputed to have occurred in 1727 further adding to the region's instability at the time. In 1780, a major earthquake hit near Tabriz and killed as many as two hundred thousand people, leaving only about thirty thousand survivors.

At the end of the 18th century, the city was divided into several districts, each ruled by a family, until 1799, when the Qajar Prince Abbas Mirza was appointed as the governor of the city. During the Qajar Empire the city was the residence for the crown prince. The crown prince normally served as governor of Azerbaijan province as well. Some of the most important events in this period were the wars between Qajar Iran and neighbouring Imperial Russia. Prior to the forced cession of Iran's Caucasian territories—comprising what is now Georgia, southern Dagestan, Azerbaijan, and Armenia—to Imperial Russia following the two Russo-Persian Wars of the first half of the 19th century, Tabriz, being strategically located, was instrumental to the implementation of Iranian rule in its Caucasian territories. During the last Russo-Persian War (1826–1828), the city was captured for Russia in 1828 by General Prince Eristov, who marched into the city with 3,000 soldiers. After Abbas Mirza and Ivan Paskevich signed the peace treaty, which granted for the irrevocable cession of the last remaining Caucasian territories, the Russian army retreated from the city. Nevertheless, Russian political and military influence remained a major force in Tabriz and north-northwestern Iran even until the fall of the Russian empire in the early 20th century. After the retreat of the Russian army, Abbas Mirza, the Qajar Crown Prince, launched a modernization scheme from Tabriz, during which he introduced Western-style institutions, imported industrial machinery, installed the first regular postal service, and undertook military reforms in the city. He also began a rebuilding campaign and established a modern taxation system.

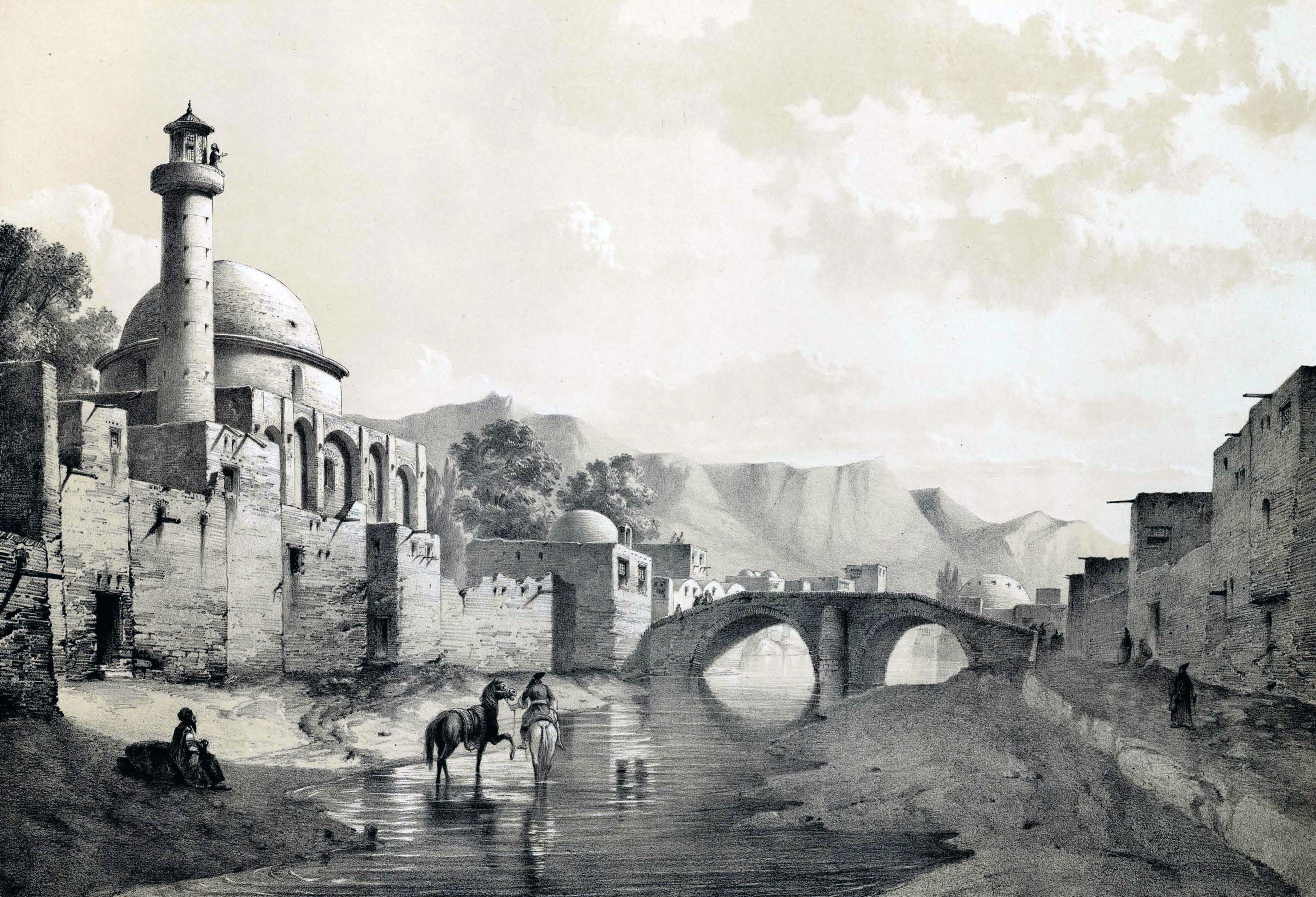
Saheb-ol-Amr Mosque and Quru river, Eugène Flandin 1841.

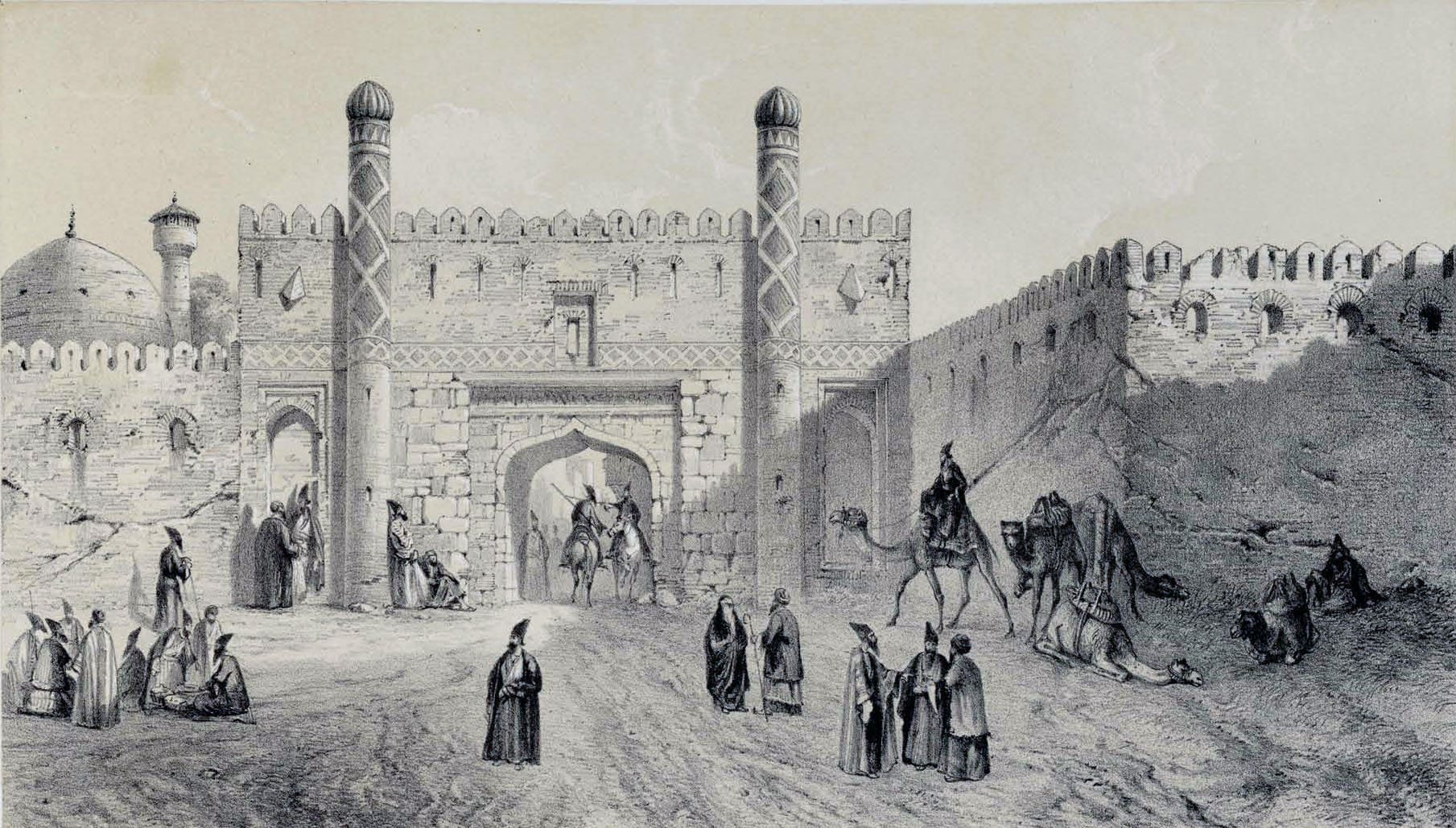
Sketch of the gate of Tabriz, Eugène Flandin 1841.

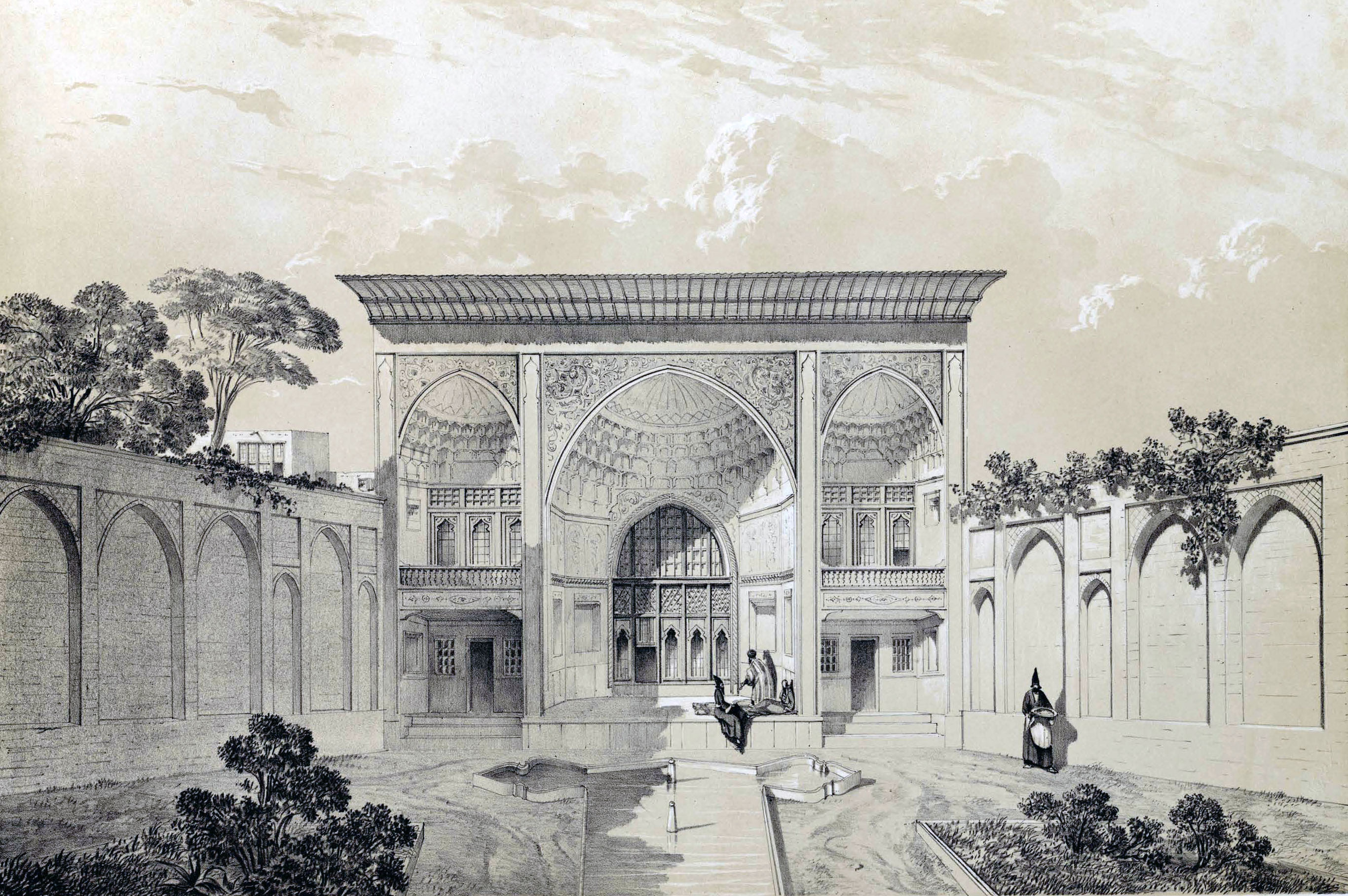
A sketch of a 19th-century house in Tabriz, Eugène Flandin.

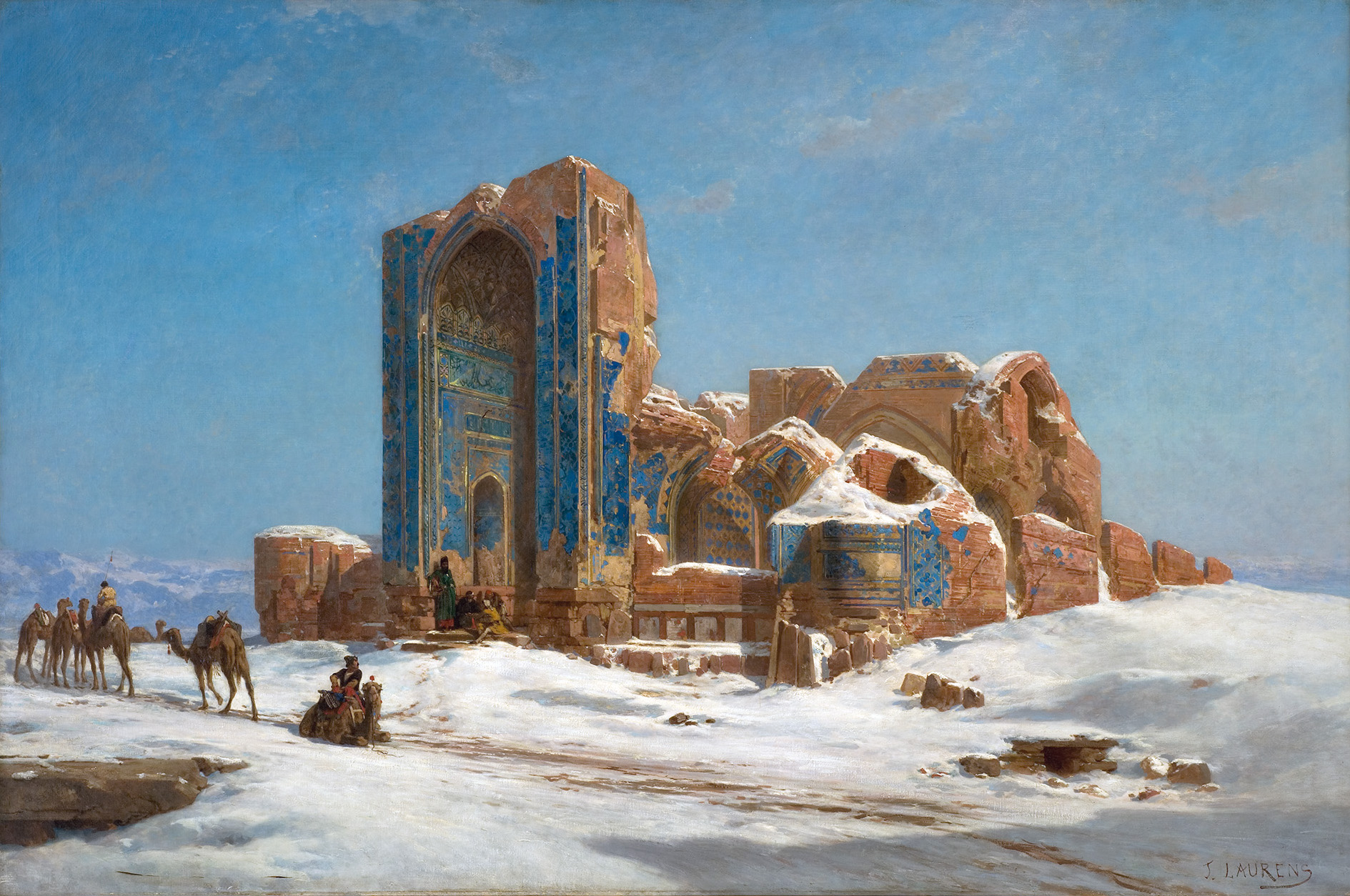
Painting of Blue mosque, Jules Laurens, 1872.

=== Contemporary era ===
Thanks to the geographical closeness to the West and to communications with nearby countries' enlightenment movements, Tabriz became the centre of the Iranian Constitutional Revolution movements between 1905 and 1911, which led to the establishment of a parliament in Iran and the formation of a constitution. Sattar Khan and Bagher Khan, two Tabrizi reformists who led Tabriz people's solidarity against the absolute monarchy, had a great role in achievement to the goals of Iran's constitutional revolution. In 1909, Tabriz was occupied by the Russian forces. Four months after the constitutional revolution's success, in December 1911, the Russians reinvaded Tabriz. After crushing the local resistance by invading Russian troops, they started suppressing the constitutional revolutionaries and residents of the city. Following the invasion, Russian troops executed about 1,200 of Tabriz residents. As a result of the campaign, Tabriz was occupied by the Russian forces between 1911 and 1917.

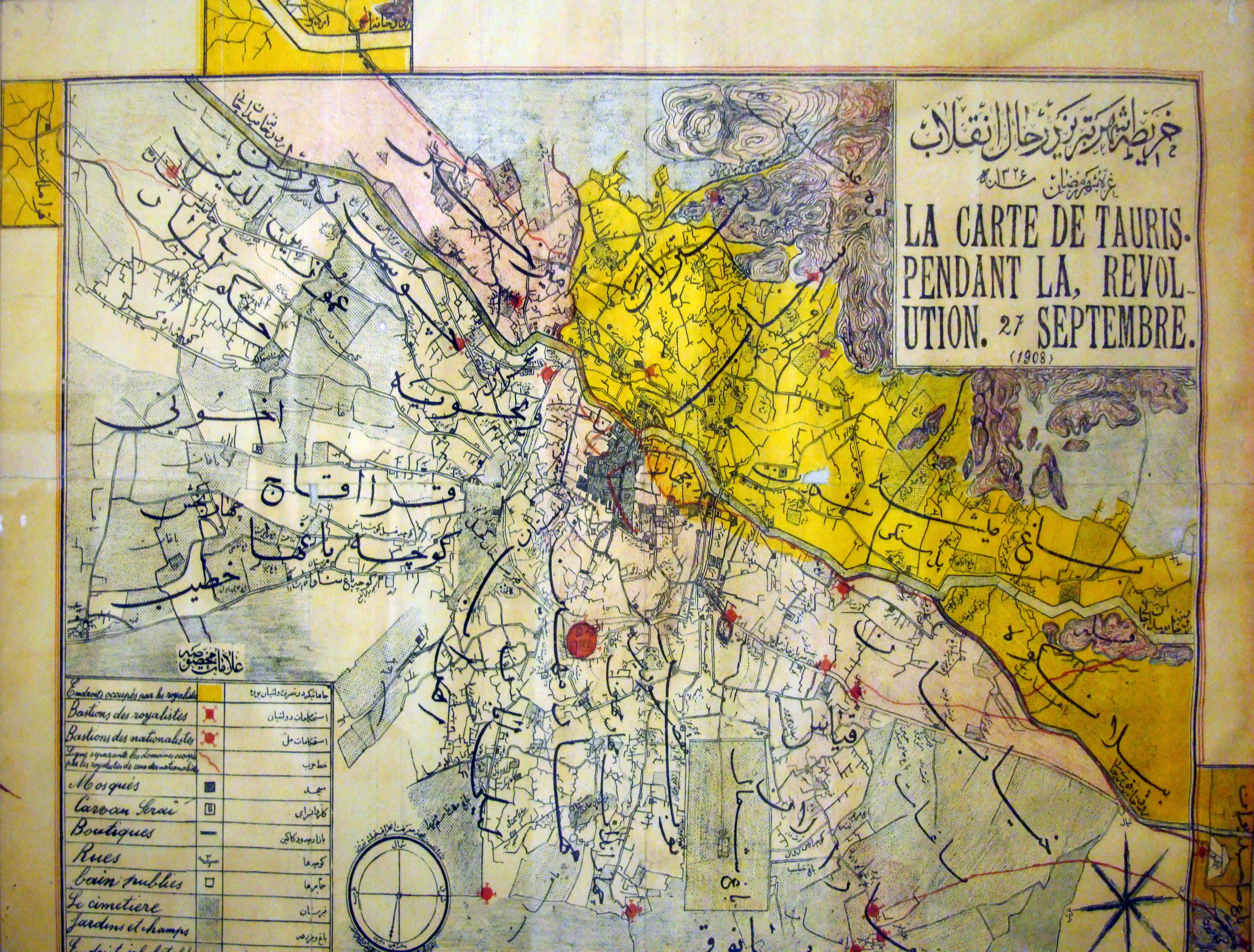
Siege of Tabriz during Constitutional Revolution, September 27, 1908.

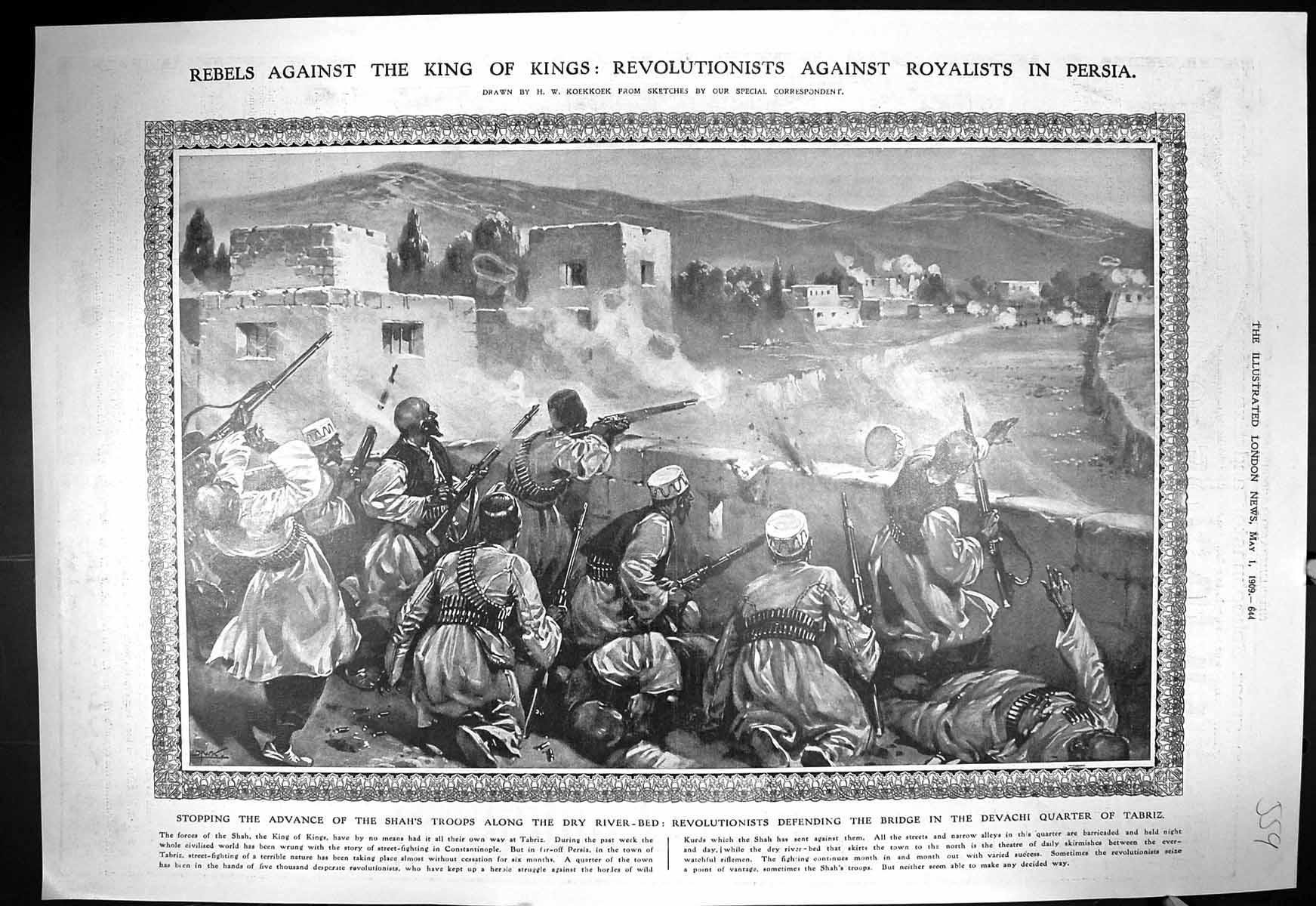
Constitutional revolutionists defending Davachi bridge against monarchists, May 1, 1909.

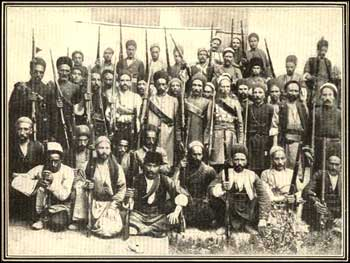
Constitutionals in Tabriz, 1911.

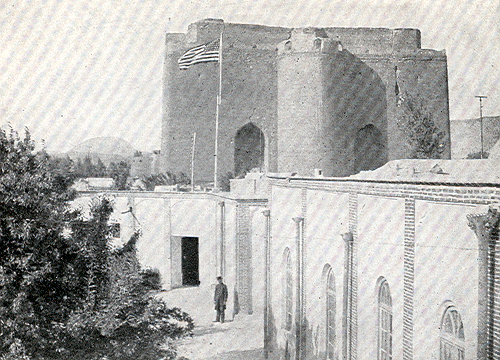
Ark of Tabriz and US flag in the days after constitutional revolution, 1911.

From the very start of World War I, Iran declared neutrality. When the war erupted on a full scale, Tabriz and much of northwestern-northern Iran had already been de facto occupied by Russia for several years. In later years of World War I, the Ottoman troops intervened and took control of the city by defeating the Russian troops stationed there. By this time, the Ottoman army led by Enver Pasha threatened the whole Russian army in the Caucasus region. Russian troops recaptured the city from the Ottomans at a later stage of the war. By escalation of the revolution in Russia, the Russian armies in Iranian Azerbaijan were evacuated, and the actual power passed into the hands of the local committee of the democrat party, with Ismail Nawbari at its head. Following Russia's retreat, the Ottomans captured the city once again for a few months until the decisive end of the war, and retreated thereafter. After World War I, a new era in the county's history began. Reza Pahlavi, brigadier-general of the Persian Cossack Brigade, declared himself the king of the country following a coup d'état. He started with promises of modernization programs in Iran which was concentrated on the unification of the country, under the idea of one country, one nation. This included centralization of the power and imposing restrictions on the local culture, heritage, and language in Iranian Azerbaijan, and the city of Tabriz. The modernization and nationalization plan of Reza Shah continued until the surge of World War II.

At the final year of the World War II despite the declaration of the neutrality by the Iranian government, the country was occupied by the allied forces. The allied forces then urged Reza Pahlavi to abdicate and installed his son Mohammad Reza as the new king of the country. The postwar situation was further complicated by Soviet aid to set up a local government called Azerbaijan People's Government in Northwest Iran, having Tabriz as its capital. The new Soviet-backed local government was run by Ja'far Pishevari and held power for one year starting from 1946. Pishevari's government gave more freedom to speech and education in Azerbaijani language and promoted local cultural heritage and gained some popularity among the residents. However, after the withdrawal of Soviet forces, Pishevari's limited armed forces were crushed by the Imperial Iranian army and the Iranian government retook control of the city. One of the major establishments in the period of Pishevari's government was opening of the University of Tabriz which played a major role in the later political movements and protests in the region.

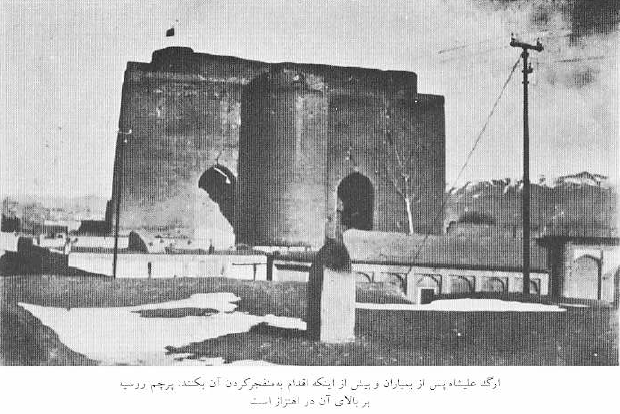
Russian Invasion of Tabriz, 1911.

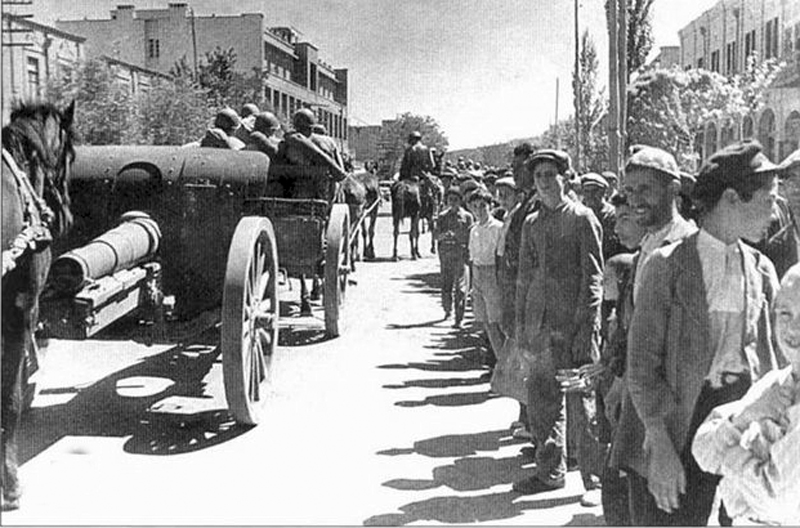
Soviet artillery units passing through Tabriz, World War II.

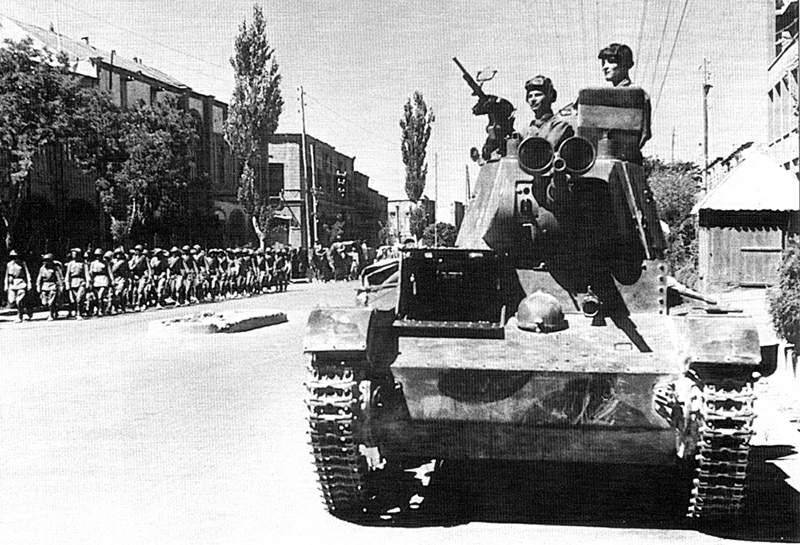
Soviet Tank and troops marching through Tabriz, World War II.

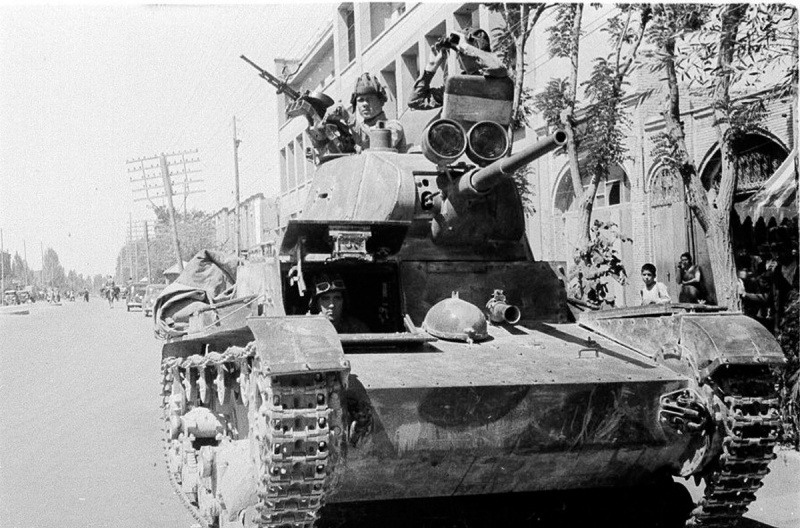
Soviet T-26 Tank passing through the main street of Tabriz, World War II.

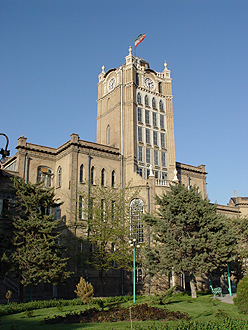
Saat Tower, Municipality Museum and former municipality office

For the next 30 years, after the collapse of Azerbaijan's autonomous government, Tabriz enjoyed a stable era until the revolution in 1979. During this period the city received significant investment in its industries and transformed into a heavy-industry hub in the northwestern Iran. The need for a strong workforce increased immigration from all around Azerbaijan toward Tabriz. During this era and because of the continuous policy of the government centralization in Tehran as well as changes in communication and transportation, the city lost its historical dominance, but turned into the gate for reform and modernization of the country.

Starting with 1978 and with the heat of the Iranian Revolution, revolutionary movements of some of Tabriz residents played a major role in the revolution. After the revolution, the residents of the city were unsatisfied with the outcome, mainly because of the ignorance of the revolutionary government about the rights of the Azerbaijani minority. Another major source of dissatisfaction was the support of most of Iranian Azerbaijanis including Tabriz residents from a more liberal cleric, Grand Ayatollah Shariatmadari, who was against the content of the new constitution which was mixing religion and state together. The unrest in the city calmed down after brutal crush of the protesters in Tabriz and after house arrest of Shariatmadari.

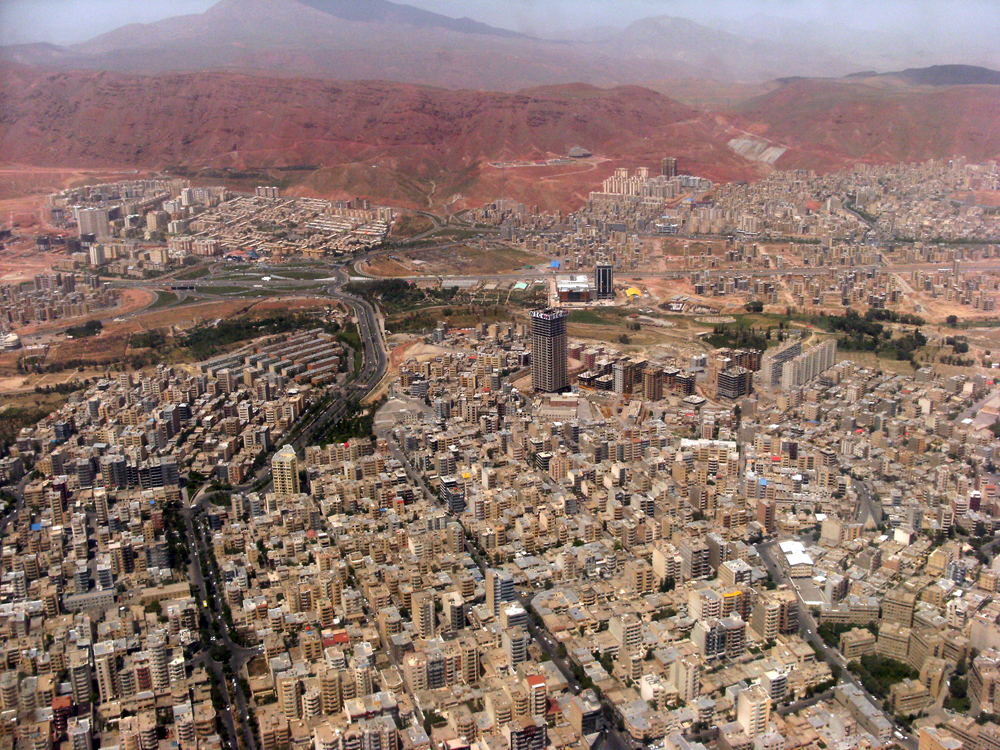
Aerial view of northeast Tabriz, May 2012

In the 1980s, due to the Iran–Iraq War, like the rest of the country, most of the construction and development projects in the city were stopped in order to fund the war costs. In addition to the indirect effects of the war, city's industrial zone, especially the oil refinery was also a major target for airstrikes by Iraqi's air forces because of the closeness to the Iraqi borderlines, and their strategic roles in the country's economy. With the escalation of the war, the attacks turned to War of the Cities and the air attacks later turned into the random strikes on the residential areas of the city in the later phase of the war.

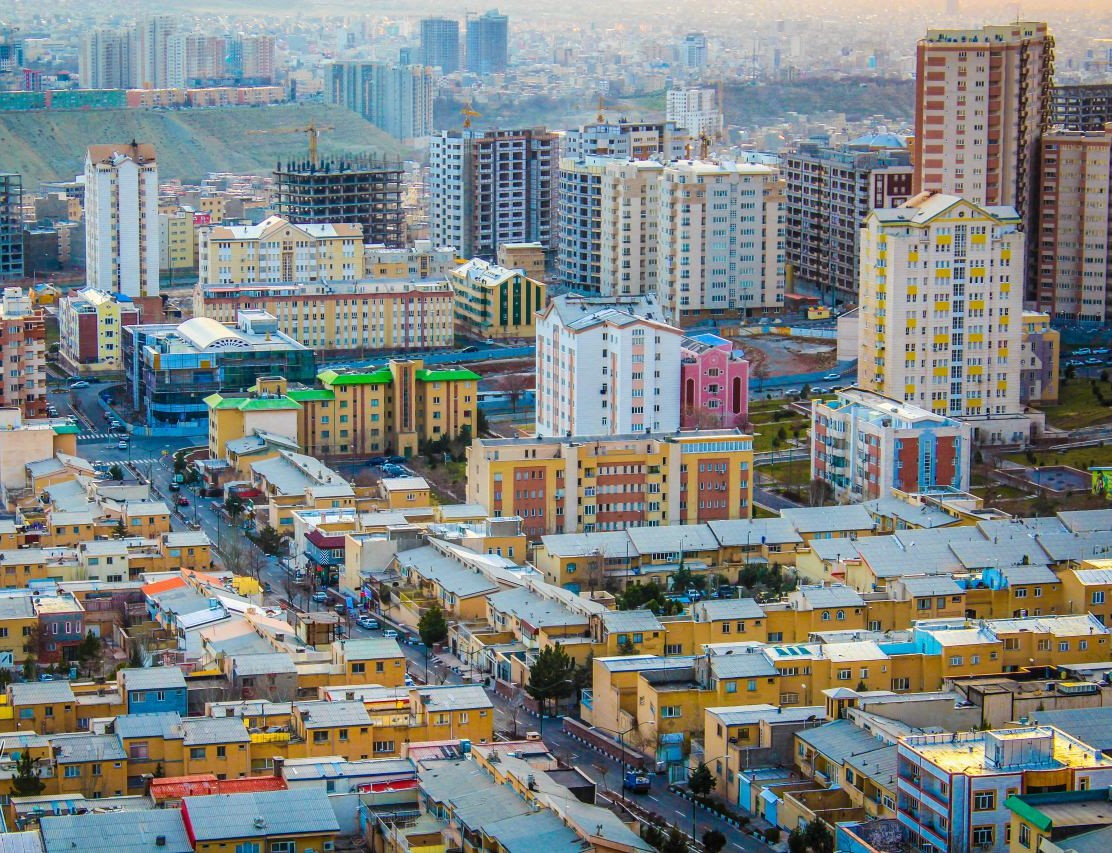
Roshdie

In recent years, Tabriz is much more stable and the new developments in the city are rapidly changing the face of the city.

=== Capital of dynasties, empires, and kingdoms before modern day ===
Tabriz was chosen as the capital by several rulers commencing from the time of Atropates. It was the capital of the Ilkhanate (Mongol) dynasty since 1265. During the Ghazan Khan era, who came into power in 1295, the city reached its highest splendour. The later realm stretched from the Amu Darya in the East to the Egypt borders in the West and from the Caucasus in the North to the Indian Ocean in the South. It was again the capital of Iran during the Qara Qoyunlu dynasty from 1375 to 1468 and then during the Ag Qoyunlu within 1468–1500 and it was capital of Iran in the Safavid period from 1501 until their defeat in 1555.

During the Qajar dynasty, Tabriz was used as residence centre of Iranian Crown Prince (1794–1925).

=== Excavation sites ===
In 2002, during a construction project at the north side of the Blue Mosque (Part of Silk Road Project), an ancient graveyard was revealed. This was kept secret until a construction worker alerted the authorities. Radiocarbon analysis by Allameh Tabatabai University has shown the background of the graves to be more than 3,800 years old. A museum of these excavations including the Blue Mosque was opened to the public in 2006.

The other excavation site is in Abbasi Street at the site of Rab'-e Rashidi, which was the location for an academic institution since approximately 700 years ago. It was established in Ilkhanid period.

== Demographics ==
=== Language ===
The predominant language spoken in Tabriz is Iranian Azerbaijani (Iranian Azerbaijani people call it Turku (تۆرکۆ) or Turki (تۆرکی)), which is a Turkic language mutually intelligible with modern Turkish dialects. The language has a strong Iranian superstratum since it has been in close contact with the Persian language for many centuries. Similar to the other parts of Iran, the official language is Persian and most inhabitants have native or near-native knowledge of Persian, which is the major medium of education. Nevertheless, the Iranian constitution respects the right to speak and have limited educational facilities in other native languages, including Azerbaijani. For the first time, an academic program on Azerbaijani opened at the University of Tabriz in 1999. Other than Azerbaijani, there is a notable minority of Armenian speakers and a smaller minority of Assyrian Neo-Aramaic speakers.

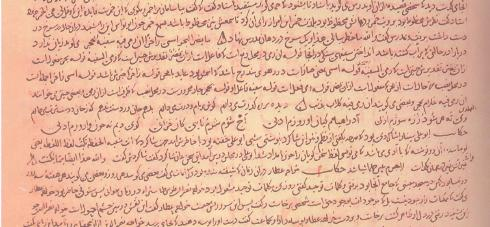
A page from the only manuscript of Safina-yi Tabriz. It contains a Persian and a Pahlavi poem

It is believed that before the gradual increase and the dominance of Azerbaijani in the area, other Iranian languages similar to Persian were spoken in Azerbaijan and Tabriz. The 13th-century manuscript Safina-yi Tabriz has poems in what its Tabriz-born author has called the Tabrizi language (Zabān-e-Tabrizi) which is similar to Persian.

=== Religion ===
After being crowned at Tabriz in 1501, Shah Ismail I announced the Twelver branch of Shia Islam as the official religion of the Safavid Empire. As a result of this royal order, the mostly Sunni population of Tabriz was force converted to Shiism. Currently, the majority of people are followers of Shia Islam.

The city has a visible Armenian Apostolic minority who follow Christianity. There used to be a small Jewish community, but most of them have moved to Tehran. There is also a small, embattled community of the Baháʼí Faith in the city.

=== Population ===
Historical population
Year	Pop.	±%
1956	289,996	—
1966	403,413	+39.1%
1976	1,074,173	+166.3%
1991	1,088,985	+1.4%
1996	1,191,043	+9.4%
2006	1,398,060	+17.4%
2011	1,494,998	+6.9%
2016	1,558,693	+4.3%

The Iranian national census was first completed in 1956 and published decennially until 2006, when, thereafter, the Statistical Center of Iran began to conduct them every five years. The 1976 census notes a total population more than double of the decade before, a result of rural to urban migration during the White Revolution. At the time of the 2006 National Census, the city's population was 1,378,931 in 378,329 households. The following census in 2011 counted 1,495,452 people in 455,494 households. The 2016 census measured the population of the city as 1,558,693 people in 497,898 households. The majority of the city's population are Azerbaijani people, followed by Persians, Kurds, Armenians, Assyrians, and other People of Caucasus.

== Geography ==
=== Topography ===
Tabriz is located in northwest of Iran in East Azerbaijan province between Eynali and Sahand mountains in a fertile area inshore of Aji River and Quri River. The local area is earthquake-prone and during its history, the city has been devastated and rebuilt several times.

Areas that Tabriz Municipality controls are:

- Tabriz
- Basmenj
- Sardrud
- Khusrowshah
- Ilkhichi
- Heravi
- Sahand (City)

=== Climate ===
Tabriz has a cold semi-arid climate (Köppen: BSk, Trewartha: BSao) bordering on a humid continental climate with hot summers (Köppen: Dsa, Trewartha: Dcao). The annual precipitation is around 260 mm (10 in), a good deal of which falls as snow during the winter months and rain in spring and autumn. The city enjoys a mild and fine climate in spring and autumn, is hot and dry in summer, while snowy and cold in winter. The average annual temperature is 13.1 °C (55.6 °F). Cool winds blow from east to west, mostly in summer.

Jean Chardin, a French traveler, visited Tabriz during the Safavid era, noting the climate in Tabriz in his travel logs: "Cold weather exists for most of the year. Since the city is northerly, snow exists on the peaks of its mountains for nine months out of the year. The wind blows during mornings and nights, while rain showers form in all seasons except summer. The weather is relatively cloudy the entire year."

Highest recorded temperature: 42.0 °C (107.6 °F) on 26 July 1966
Lowest recorded temperature: −25.0 °C (−13.0 °F) on 20 January 1964

Climate data for Tabriz (1991–2020 normals, extremes 1951–present)
Month	Jan	Feb	Mar	Apr	May	Jun	Jul	Aug	Sep	Oct	Nov	Dec	Year
Record high °C (°F)	16.0 (60.8)	19.0 (66.2)	25.6 (78.1)	31.2 (88.2)	33.8 (92.8)	39.0 (102.2)	42.0 (107.6)	41.0 (105.8)	38.0 (100.4)	30.6 (87.1)	23.4 (74.1)	21.8 (71.2)	42.0 (107.6)
Mean daily maximum °C (°F)	3.6 (38.5)	6.5 (43.7)	12.1 (53.8)	17.9 (64.2)	23.7 (74.7)	30.0 (86.0)	33.6 (92.5)	33.7 (92.7)	28.9 (84.0)	21.5 (70.7)	12.3 (54.1)	5.7 (42.3)	19.1 (66.4)
Daily mean °C (°F)	−1.2 (29.8)	1.3 (34.3)	6.5 (43.7)	12.1 (53.8)	17.4 (63.3)	23.3 (73.9)	26.6 (79.9)	26.6 (79.9)	21.8 (71.2)	14.8 (58.6)	6.7 (44.1)	1.0 (33.8)	13.1 (55.5)
Mean daily minimum °C (°F)	−5.3 (22.5)	−3.4 (25.9)	1.1 (34.0)	6.2 (43.2)	11.0 (51.8)	16.3 (61.3)	20.1 (68.2)	20.0 (68.0)	15.0 (59.0)	8.7 (47.7)	2.0 (35.6)	−3 (27)	7.4 (45.3)
Record low °C (°F)	−25.0 (−13.0)	−22.0 (−7.6)	−19.0 (−2.2)	−12.0 (10.4)	−0.1 (31.8)	4.0 (39.2)	7.0 (44.6)	10.0 (50.0)	4.0 (39.2)	−4.0 (24.8)	−17.0 (1.4)	−19.5 (−3.1)	−25.0 (−13.0)
Average precipitation mm (inches)	20.3 (0.80)	20.4 (0.80)	31.6 (1.24)	51.5 (2.03)	38.3 (1.51)	10.9 (0.43)	6.7 (0.26)	3.6 (0.14)	5.6 (0.22)	19.3 (0.76)	27.0 (1.06)	23.3 (0.92)	258.5 (10.17)
Average precipitation days (≥ 1.0 mm)	4.4	4.2	6.6	7.4	7.1	2.2	1.3	0.7	1.4	3.2	4.5	4.6	47.6
Average snowy days	9.3	7.9	4.9	1.0	0.0	0.0	0.00	0.0	0.0	0.3	1.8	6.2	31.4
Average relative humidity (%)	71	65	56	53	48	37	34	33	37	47	62	70	51.1
Average dew point °C (°F)	−6.0 (21.2)	−5.0 (23.0)	−2.7 (27.1)	1.7 (35.1)	5.0 (41.0)	6.3 (43.3)	8.3 (46.9)	7.6 (45.7)	5.2 (41.4)	2.6 (36.7)	−0.6 (30.9)	−4.2 (24.4)	1.5 (34.7)
Mean monthly sunshine hours	141	161	192	213	273	332	350	343	302	241	179	136	2,863
Source 1: NOAA NCEI,
Source 2: IRIMO(records), (snow/sleet days 1951–2010)

=== Environment pollution ===
Air pollution is one of the major environmental issues in Tabriz. Air pollution is due to an increase of the number of cars commuting in the city and polluting industries such as thermal power plants, petrochemical complexes and the oil refinery in the west of the city. Air pollution levels increased continuously in the second half of the 20th century. With a mandate of national environmental codes by heavy industries, industrial air pollution has reduced in recent years. However, the air quality in the city is far from world norms for clean air.

An immediate environmental threat is the shrinkage and drying out of the Lake Urmia located in the outskirts of Western Tabriz. The lake has faced a grave crisis since the late 20th century. Water depth reduction, increasing water salinity to saturation level and the appearance of vast salt fields around the lake, are alarming indications of gradual total desiccation of a unique ecosystem. This occurred due to global warming and ever-increasing demands for inadequate freshwater sources in the basin. It is feared that in the near future low-lying clouds of airborne salt and minerals may hover over large areas around the lake, posing serious health hazards.

== Governance ==
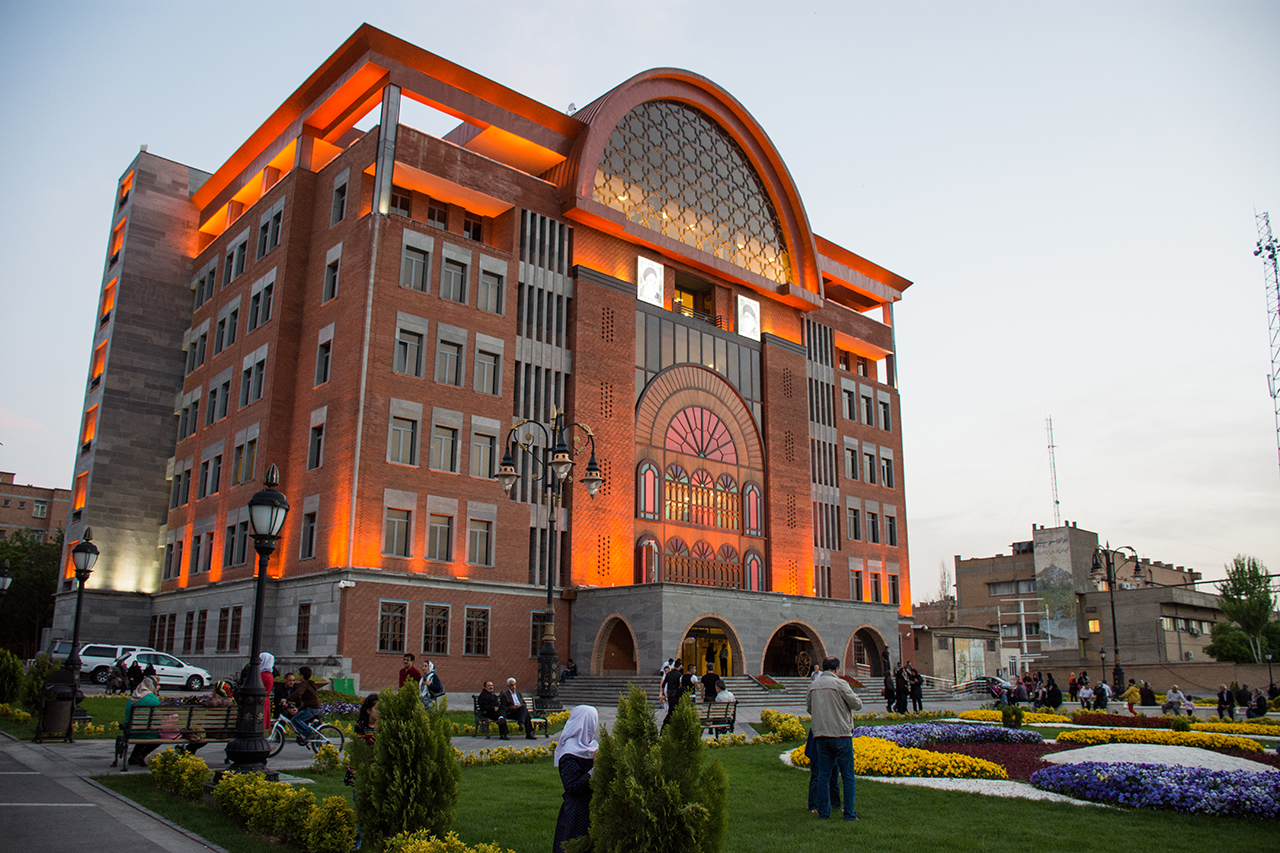
Main Municipality Office

Authority for the city lies with the Mayor, who is elected by a municipal board. The municipal board is periodically elected by the city's residents. The Municipal central office is located in the Tabriz Municipality Palace.

=== Historic municipal districts ===
Tabriz is divided into 10 municipal districts. Each municipal district retains a number of the older neighborhoods that are of cultural and historical interest.

- Ahrab (اهراب)
- Akhmaqaya (آخماقایا)
- Amraqiz (امره قیز)
- Bahar (باهار)
- Baghshoumal (باغ‌ شمال)
- Baron Avak (Barnava) (بارناوا، بارون‌آواک)
- Bazaar (بازار)
- Beylanki (Beylankooh) (بیلانکی)
- Charandab (چرنداب)
- Chousdouzan (چوس‌دوزان)
- Davachi (دوچی)
- Gajil (گجیل)
- Gazran (Re. Khayyam) (گزران)
- Imamieh (امامیه)
- Hokmavar (حکم‌آوار)
- Kouchebagh (کوچه‌ باغ)
- Khatib (Hatib) (خطیب)
- Khayyam (خیام)
- Khiyavan (خیاوان)
- Kujuvar (کوجووار)
- Laklar (لک لر)
- Lalah (لاله)
- Lilava (Leylabad) (لیل‌آباد)
- Maghsoudia (مقصودیه)
- Maralan (مارالان)
- Nobar (نوبار)
- Qaraghaj (قره‌آغاج)
- Qaramalik (قارا‌ ملیک)
- Rastakucha (راستا کوچه)
- Sarlak (سرلک)
- Selab (سیلاب)
- Shanb-e-Ghazan (شنب غازان)
- Sheshghelan (ششگلان)
- Sirkhab (سیرخاب)
- Tapalibagh (تپه لی باغ)
- Vardjibashi (Vidjooya) (ورجی باشی، ویجویه)

=== Modern municipal districts ===
This is table of modern Tabriz districts.

- Parvaz (Persian: پرواز)
- Golshahr (گلشهر)
- Zafaranieh (زعفرانیه)
- Rajae Shahr (رجائی‌شهر)
- Hafez (حافظ)
- Mandana (ماندانا)
- Nesfrah (نصف راه)
- Valieamr (ولی امر)
- Narmak (نارمک)
- Yaghchian (یاغچیان)
- Marzdaran (مرزداران)
- Baghmishe (باغمیشه)
- Elahiyeh (الهیه)
- Abrisham (ابریشم)
- Baharestan (بهارستان)
- Misagh (میثاق)
- Sahand (سهند)
- Ashkan (اشکان)
- Jamaran (جماران)
- Abresan (آبرسان)
- Vali Asr (ولیعصر)
- Elahi Parast (الهی‌پرست)
- Ferdows / (فردوس)
- North Fereshteh (فرشته شمالی)
- Roshdieh (رشدیه)
- Mirdamad (میرداماد)
- Andishe (اندیشه)
- Khavaran (خاوران)

== Culture and art ==
=== Literature ===
Sahand, o mountain of pure snow,
Descended from Heaven with Zoroaster
Fire in your heart, snow on your shoulders,
with storm of centuries,
And white hair of history on your chest ...

Yadollah Maftun Amini (1926–2022)

The city of Tabriz, historically located at the westernmost end of Iran's trade route and situated along the Silk Road, has long been a hub of commerce as well as culture and art. This strategic position facilitated both economic prosperity and the flourishing of cultural exchanges. In the modern era, the establishment of Memorial School in the late 19th century, followed by the founding of the University of Tabriz, along with the presence of intellectual movements, further boosted the city's cultural development.

Tabriz is also the birthplace of one of Iran's most prominent schools of painting, known as the "Tabriz School." This artistic movement flourished during the periods of the Ilkhanate, Jalayirids, Qara Qoyunlu, Aq Qoyunlu, and Safavid dynasties, leaving a lasting impact on Iranian art.

The proximity to Sahand, a mountain in the south of the city, has been a source of inspiration for contemporary revolutionaries and poets alike. The power of this inspiring source, however, goes to much earlier times. Tabriz was a house for numerous Iranian writers, poets, and illumination movements. In old times the city notables supported poets and writers by organizing periodical meetings. Within its long history, it was a residence for many well known Iranian writers and poets. The list can start from the old-time Rumi, Qatran, Khaqani to recent years Samad Behrangi, Gholam-Hossein Sa'edi, Parvin E'tesami. The prominent Iranian Azerbaijani poet Mohammad-Hossein Shahriar was born in Tabriz. The culture, social values, language and music is a mixture of what exists in the rest of Iran.

Tabriz also has a special place in Persian literature, as the following sample of verses from some of Iran's best poets and authors illustrates:

ساربانا بار بگشا ز اشتران
شهر تبريز است و کوی دلبران

Oh Sārbān, have the camels' cargo unloaded,
This is Tabriz, the neighborhood of the beloved ones.
―Molana

عزیزی در اقصای تبریز بود
که همواره بیدار و شبخیز بود

A beloved lived in Tabriz away from sight,
who was always alert and awake at night
―Bustan of Sadi

تا به تبریزم دو چیزم حاصل است
نیم نان و آب مهران رود و بس

As long as I live in Tabriz, two things I need not worry about,
The half loaf of bread and the water of Mehranrud [river] are enough!
―Khaqani

اين ارك بلند شهر تبريز است
افراشته قامتِ رسايش را

This is the tall Arg of Tabriz City,
Raised its outstanding height there!
―Maftun

=== Music ===
A century-long autocratic nation-building policy of central governments in Iran has succeeded in cultural assimilation in the favour of a government-sanctioned culture. As a result, Tabriz, by the turn of the 20th century had nearly become devoid of its once characteristic cultural identity. Thanks to the more liberal policies of the Khatami era (1998–2006), a cultural renaissance took place and the local music was revitalized.

The traditional Azerbaijani music is divided into two distinct types, the music of "ashugh" and the "mugham". Mugham, despite its similarity to Persian classical music, was not common among Iranian Azerbaijanis. In recent years, however, mugham is gaining popularity among the educated middle-class young generation. For instance, Nasir Atapur, from Tabriz, was the laureate of Mugam contest 2007.

The ashugh music had survived in a mountainous region of Qaradağ and presently is identified as the characteristic form of music in all Azerbaijan. The ashugh music, throughout its long history, had been associated with nomadic life in mountainous regions and used to be dismissed as back-country folklore. The recent identity renaissance of Azerbaijani speaking people has elevated the status of Ashughs as the guardians of national culture. The newfound unprecedented popularity and frequent concerts and performances in urban settings have resulted in rapid innovative developments aiming to enhance the urban-appealing aspects of these ashugh performances. The main factor for these developments was the opening of academic style music classes in Tabriz by master Ashugs, such as Aşiq Imran Heydəri.

Ashugs (Aşiq in Azerbaijani language stemmed from the Arabic word for lover) were travelling bards who sang and played saz, an eight or ten string plucking instrument in the form of a long-necked lute. Their roots can be traced back to at least the 7th century according to the Turkic epic Dede Korkut. Naturally, the music has evolved in the course of the grand migration and ensuing feuds with the original inhabitants the acquired lands. Still, the essence of the original epics, i.e. metamorphic description of life in pastoral terms with direct reference to the mountainous landscape, persists to the present time. The characteristic aspect of the Ashugh music is its frequent allusions to a mountain with the intention of arousing an emotional state with a tone of mild melancholy in a listener. The first verses of a contemporary Ashug song, composed by Məhəmməd Araz, may well represent the essence of Ashugh music may clarify the said statement.

Bəlkə bu yerlərə birdə gəlmədim (I may not come to these mountains again) duman səlamət qal dağ səlamət qal (Farewell to the Mist and to the mountain) arxamca su səpir göydə bulutlar (Clouds sprinkle drops of rain) leysan səlamət qal yağ səlamət qal (Farewell to summer days, farewell to the rain)

=== Painting ===
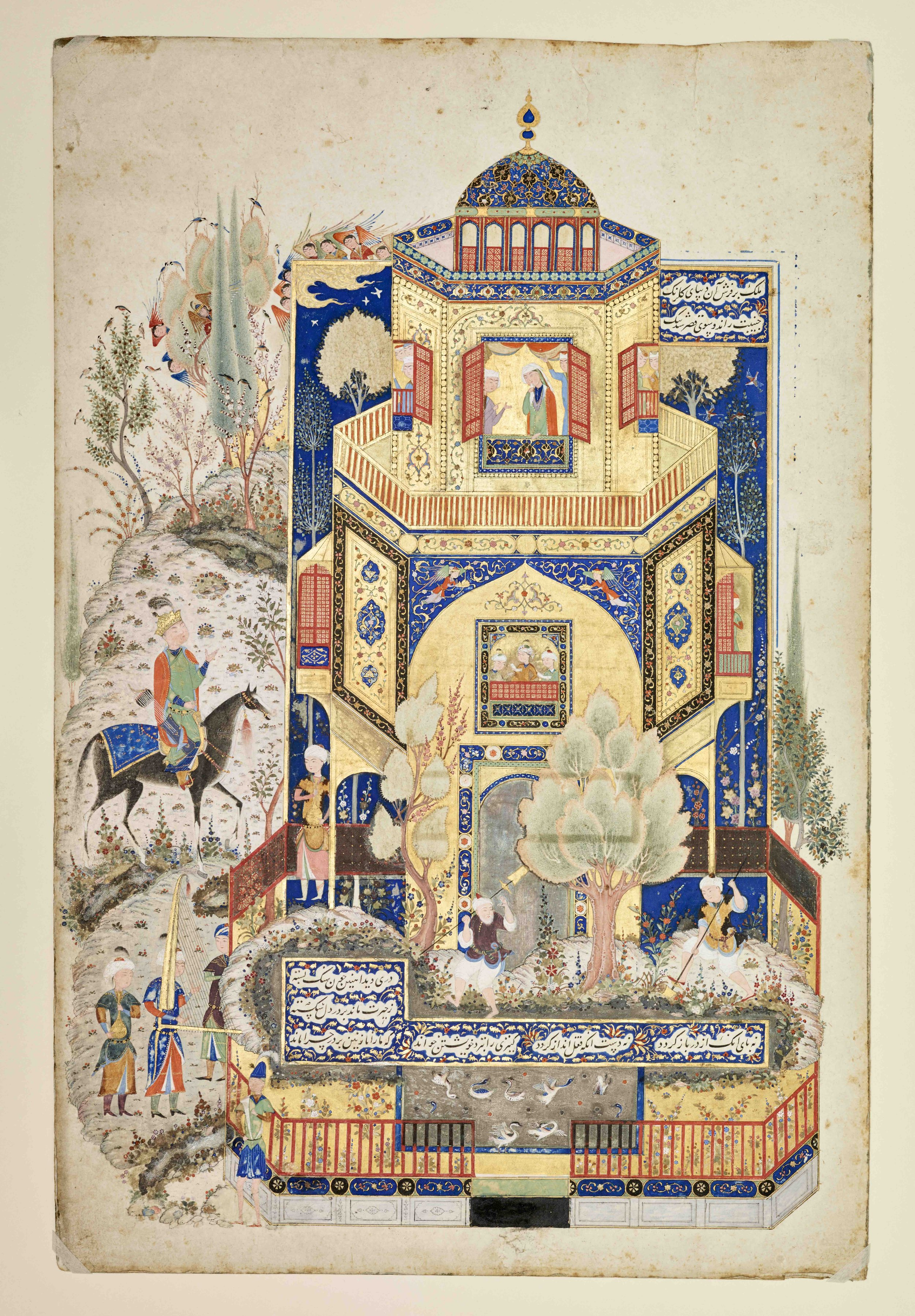
Khusraw at Shirin’s Palace. Tabriz, last quarter of the 15th-century. Keir Collection of Islamic Art

"Tabrizian style" painting was shaped in the era of Ilkhanids, Kara Koyunlu and the Safavids. The paintings date back to the early 14th century and show significant influence from Chinese and Chinese-influenced pictures. Over the years Tabriz became the centre of the noteworthy school of Persian miniature painting. A fictional account of "Tabrizian style" painting in the Safavids era is narrated by Orhan Pamuk in My Name Is Red.

=== Cuisine ===
Famous dishes in Tabriz include:

Aash is a kind of soup prepared with bouillon, various vegetables, carrots, noodles and spices.

Abgoosht or Shorva (آب‌گوشت) is a hearty soup made of mutton and chickpeas. It has been cooked in Iran for many years and, until recently, was the main dish of most families in Tabriz.

Chelow kabab, kebab and roasted tomatoes (and roasted hot peppers occasionally) served on a plate of steamed rice, is the national dish of Iran. Tabriz is famous for the quality of its chelow kabab.

Dolma is a traditional food, prepared by filling an eggplant, capsicum, tomato or zucchini with a mixture of meat, split pea, onion and various spices.

Garniyarikh (meaning "the torn abdomen" in Azerbaijani) is a kind of dolma filled with meat, garlic, almonds and spices.

Tabriz meatballs are large meatballs composed of ground meat, rice, and leeks, alongside various other ingredients. The word kofta is derived from Persian kūfta: in Persian, kuftan (کوفتن) means "to beat" or "to grind".

There are also confections, biscuits and cookies which are Tabriz specialties, including Qurabiya, Tabrizi Lovuez, Riss, Nougat, Tasbihi, Latifeh, Ahari, Lovadieh, and Lokum.

== Main sights ==
Tabriz was devastated by several earthquakes during its history (e.g., in 858, 1041, and 1721) and as a result, from numerous monuments only few of them or part of them have survived until now. Moreover, some of the historical monuments have been destroyed fully or partially within construction projects (the Arg of Tabriz is in danger of destruction now, because of the ongoing nearby construction project of Mosal'laye Emam). Nonetheless, there are still numerous monuments remaining until now, which include:

- Aji Chay Bridge
- Amir Nezam House (Qajar museum)
- Arg of Tabriz
- Azerbaijan Museum
- Baghmasha gate
- Bazaar of Tabriz, a world heritage site
- Behnam House (school of architecture)
- Blue Mosque (Goy Masjid)
- Constitutional Revolution House of Tabriz (Mashrouteh museum)
- Daneshsara (faculty of education)
- Document Museum
- East-Azerbaijan State Palace
- Ferdowsi street
- Ghadaki house
- Qari Bridge
- Haidarzadeh house
- Hariree house
- House of Seghat ol Islam
- Imamzadeh Hamzah, Tabriz
- Iron Age museum
- Jamee mosque of Tabriz
- Madrasah Akbarieh
- Maqbaratoshoara (tomb of poets)
- Measure museum
- Municipality of Tabriz
- Museum of Ostad Bohtouni
- Nobar bath
- On ibn Ali's shrine
- Ordobadi house
- Pahlavi street (Imam St.)
- Pol Sanghi (Stone bridge)
- Pottery museum
- Protestant church of Tabriz
- Roshdieh school
- Ruins of Rabe Rashidi University
- Saheb ol Amr mosque
- Saint Mary Church of Tabriz (Armenian church)
- Salmasi house Measure museum
- Seventh-day Adventist Church, Armenian
- Seyed Hamzeh shrine
- Shahnaz street
- Shahryar literature museum (house of Shahryar)
- Shohada Mosque
- Tabriz Art University (former Charmsazi Khosravi)
- Tabriz Fire Fighting Tower
- Tabriz Museum of Natural History
- Tabriz Railway Station
- Tabriz Vocational Museum
- Tarbiyat street
- Two Kamals tomb
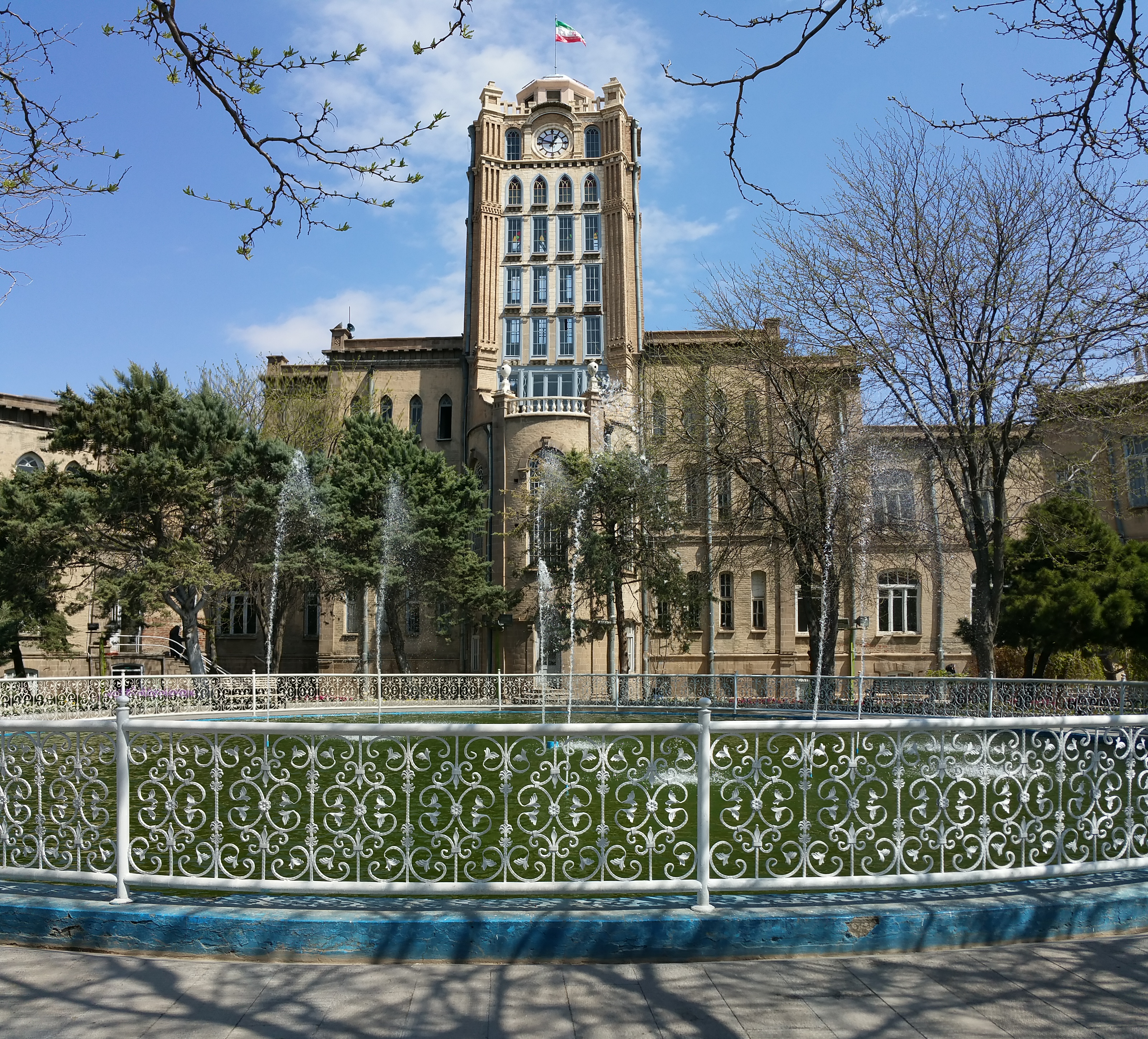
Saat Tower

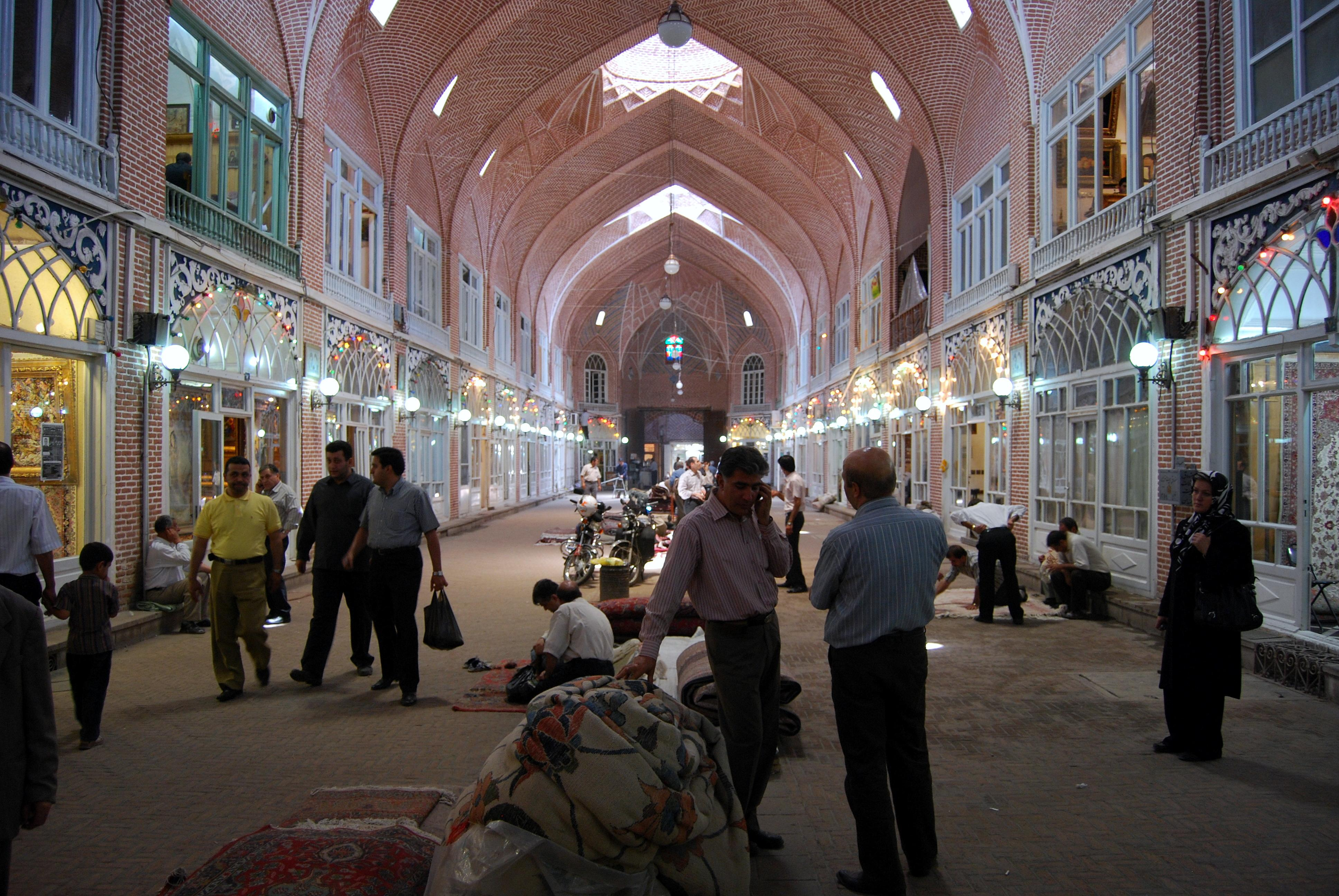
The Grand Bazaar

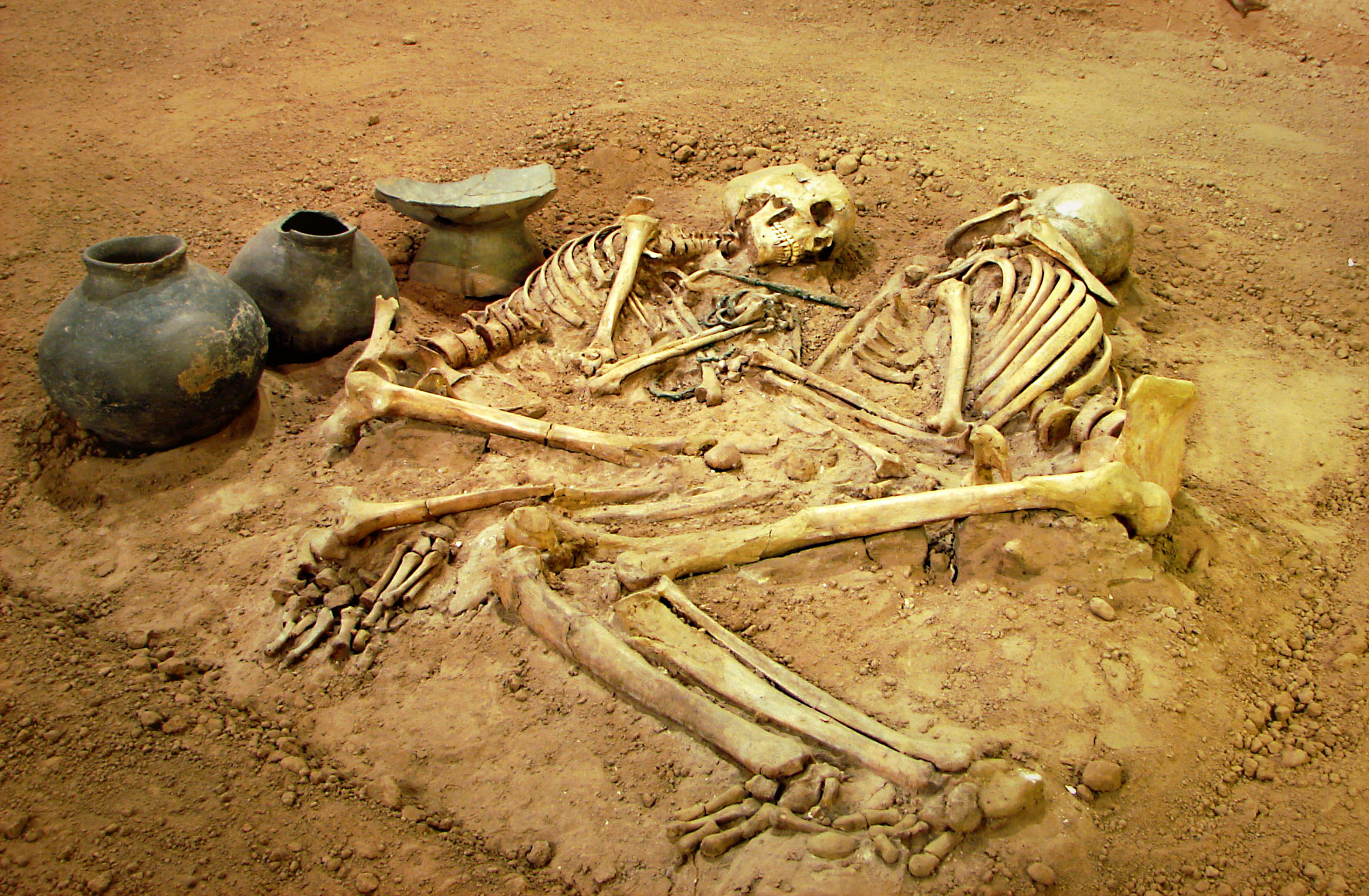
Iron Age museum

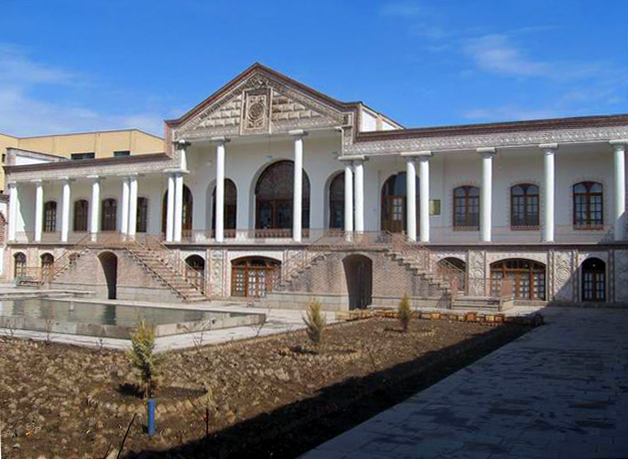
Amir Nezam House (Qajar museum)

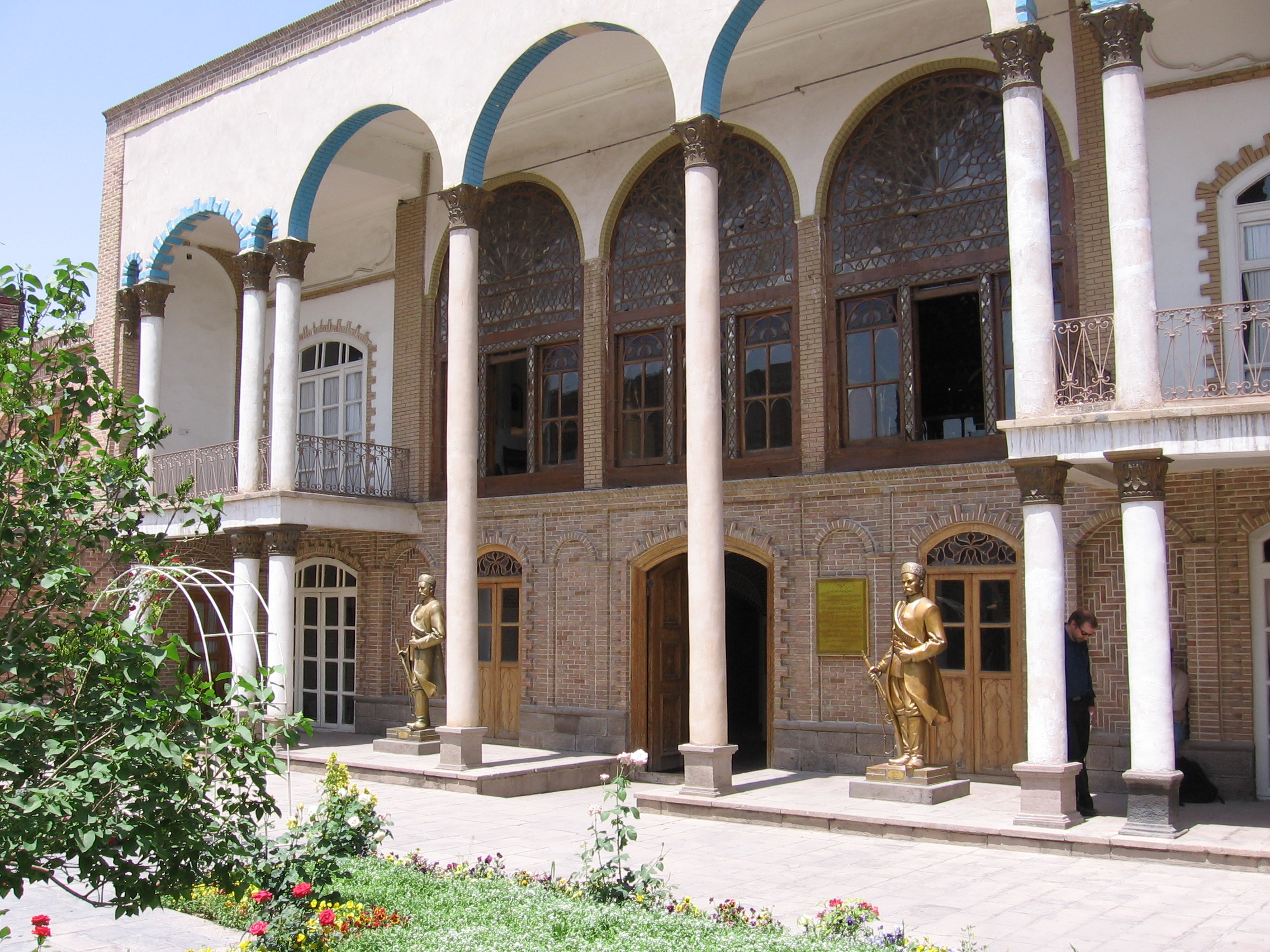
Constitution House of Tabriz

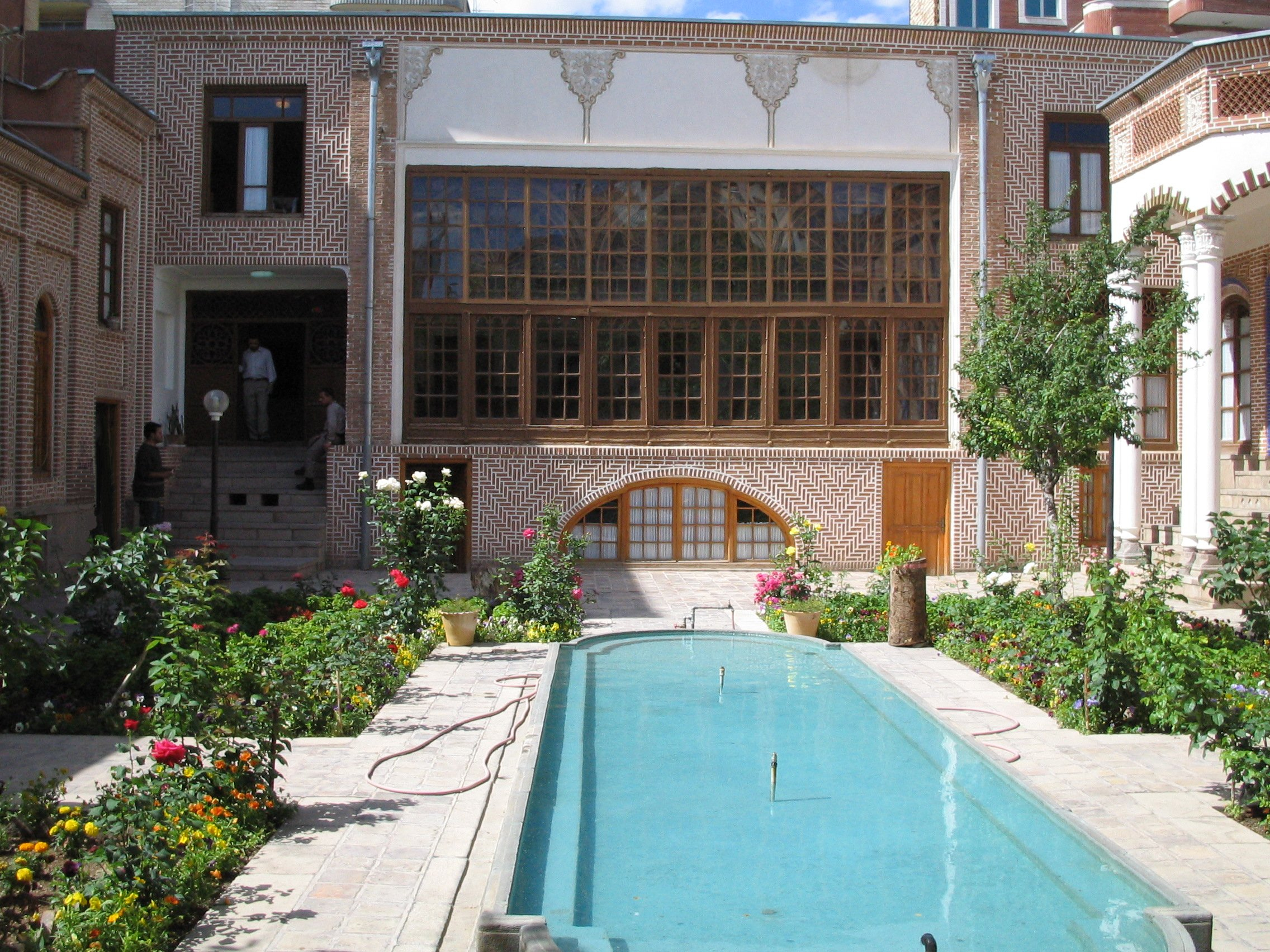
Measure museum of Tabriz

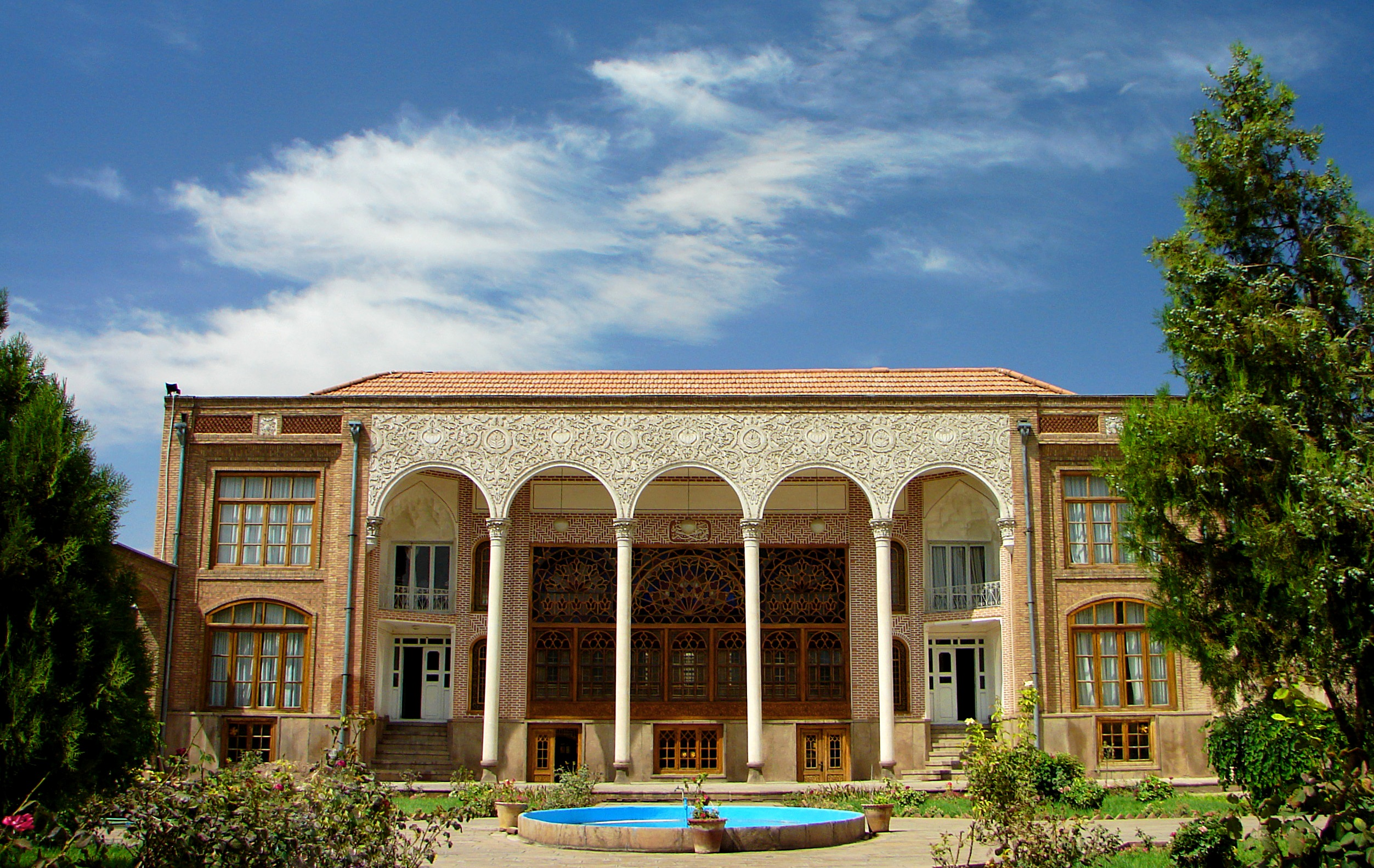
Behnam House

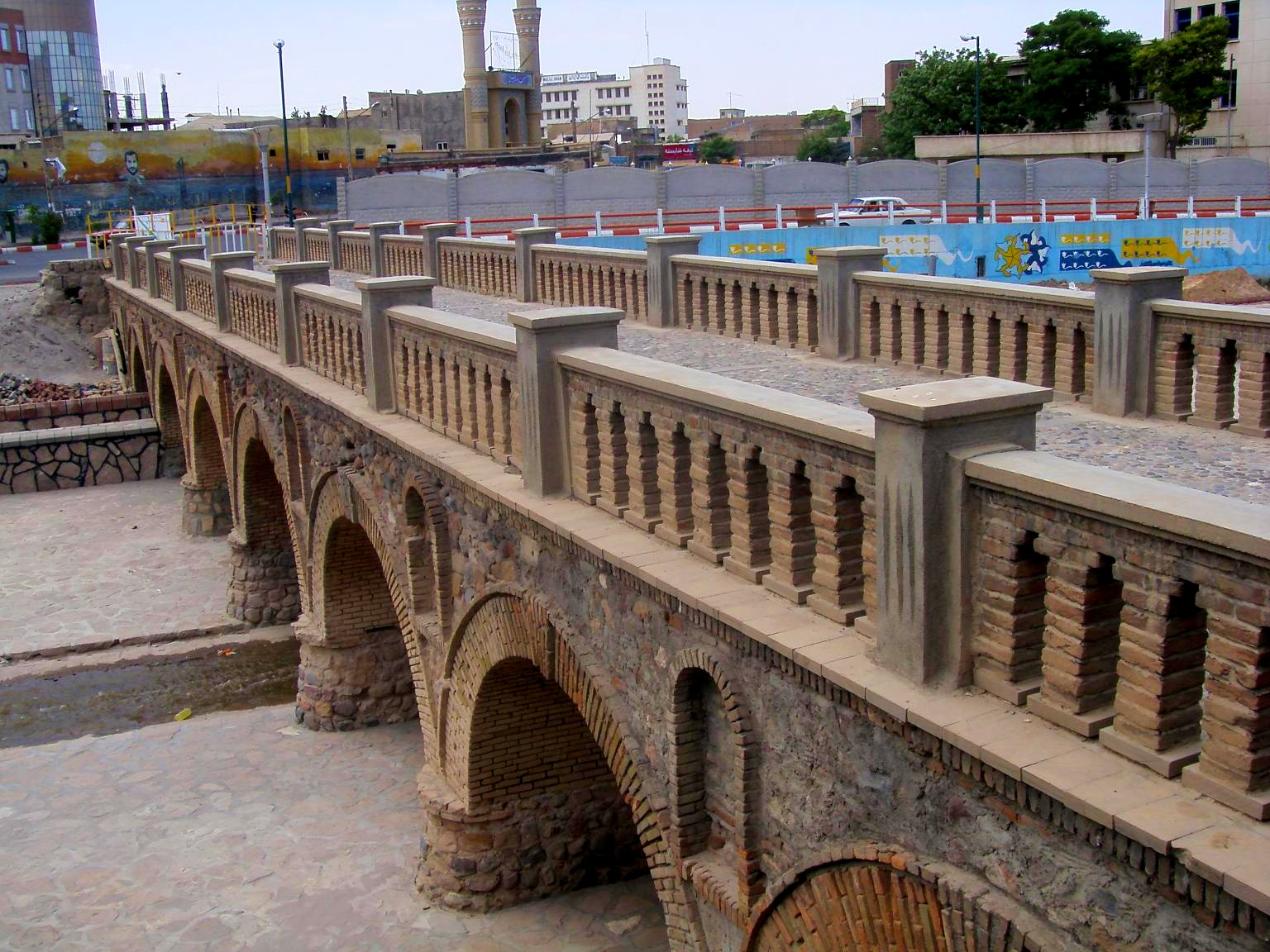
Qari Bridge

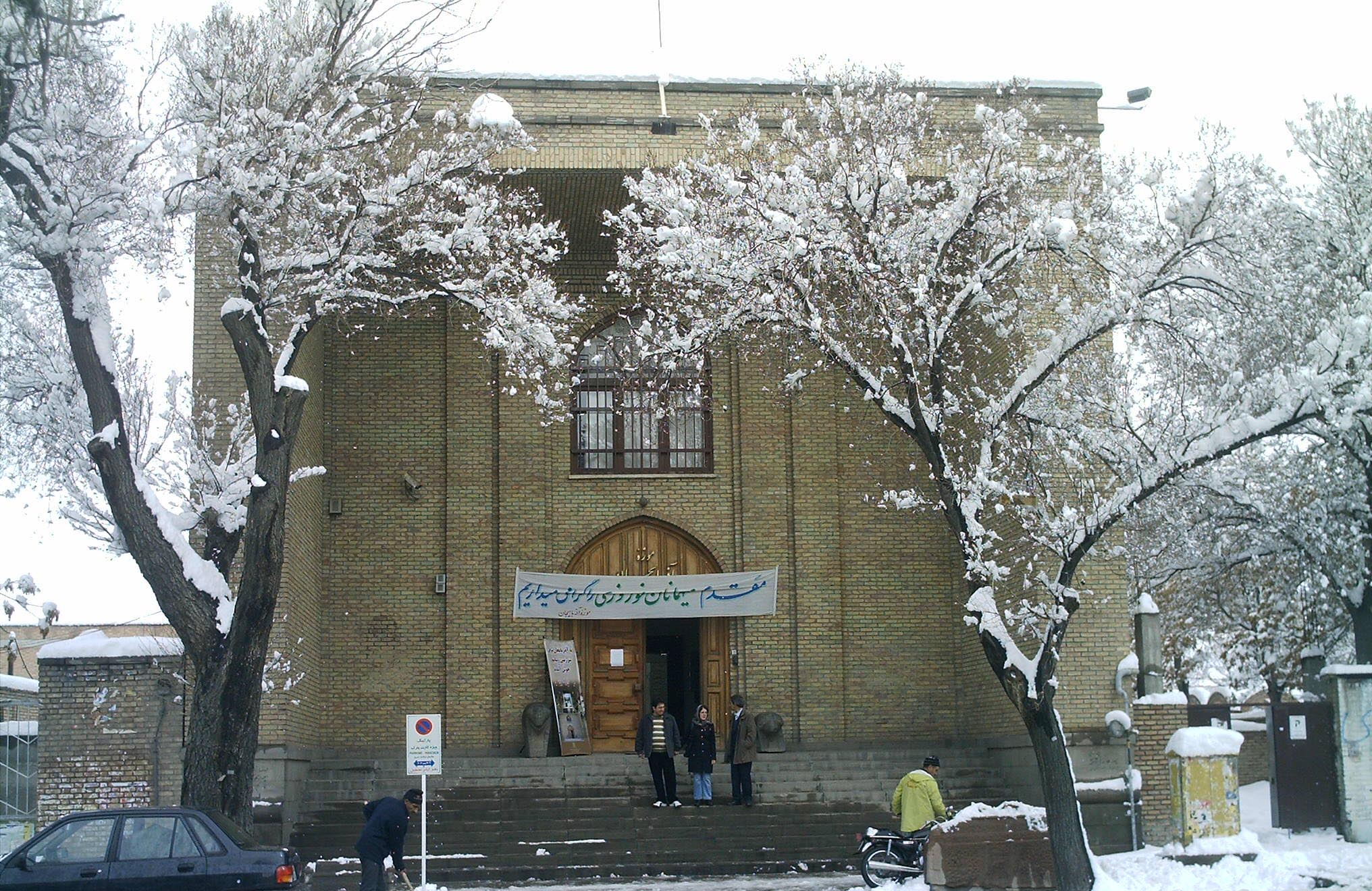
Azerbaijan Museum

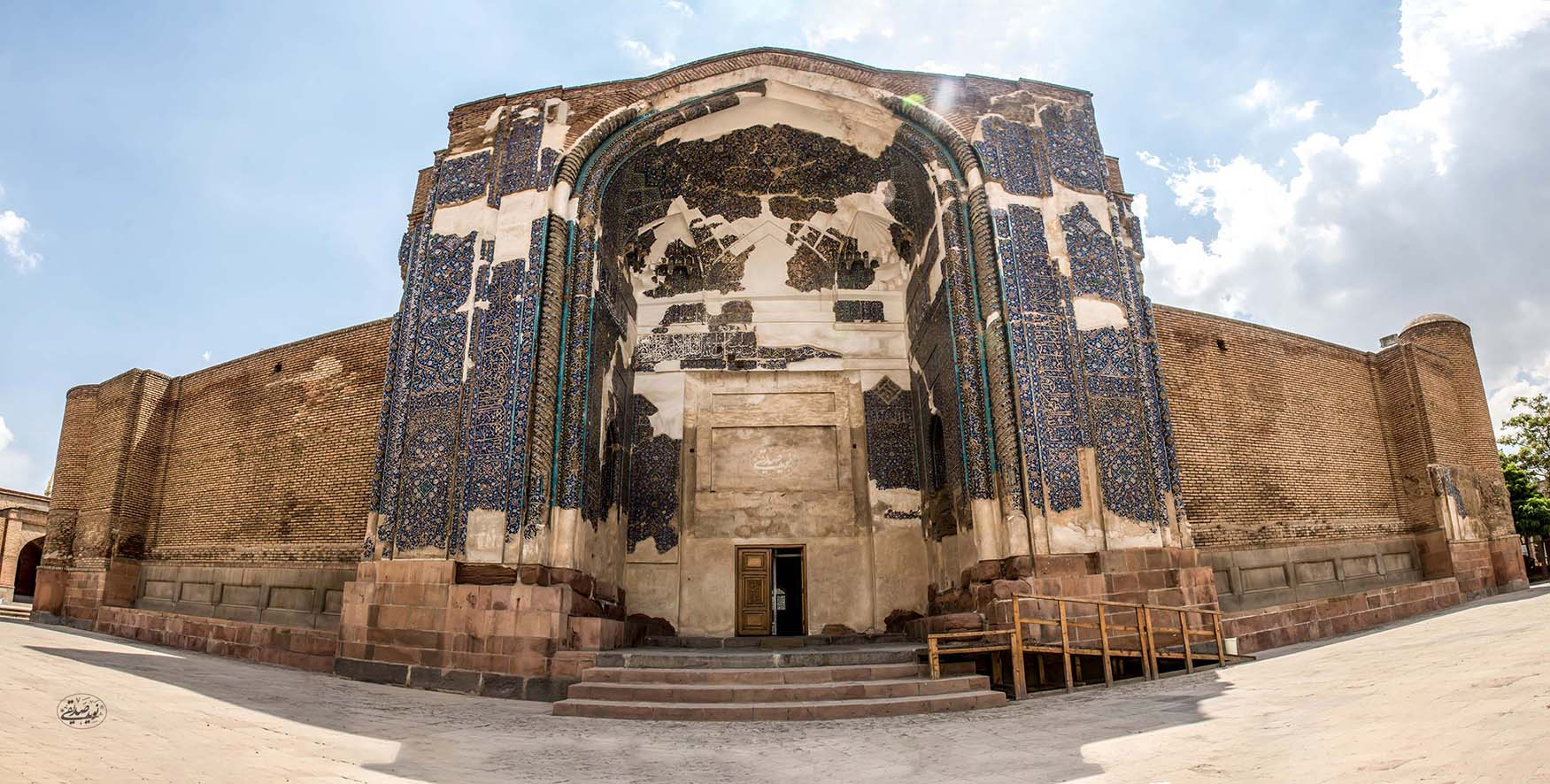
Blue Mosque

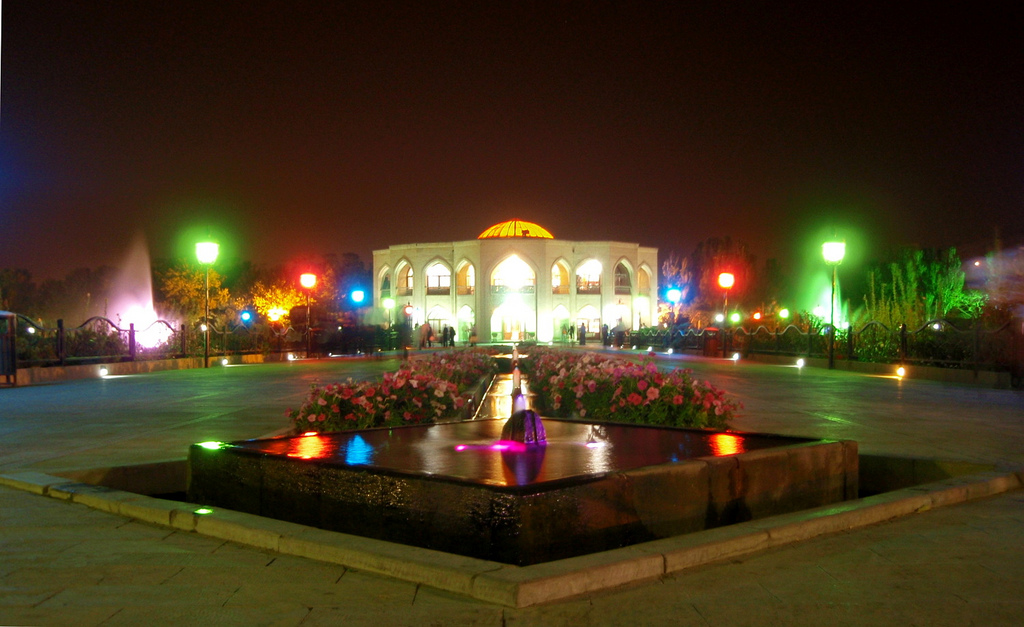
Shah-goli park

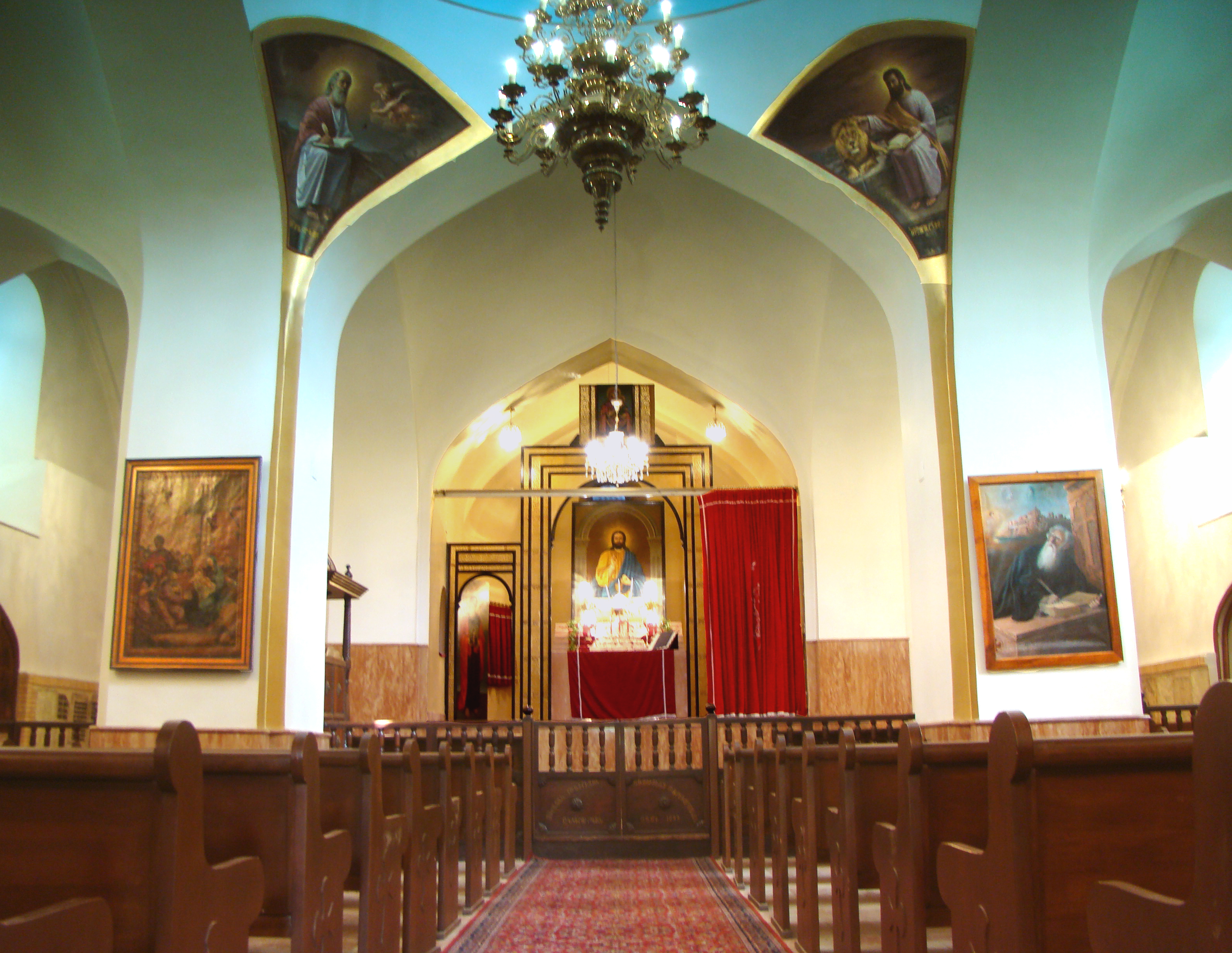
Saint Mary Church of Tabriz

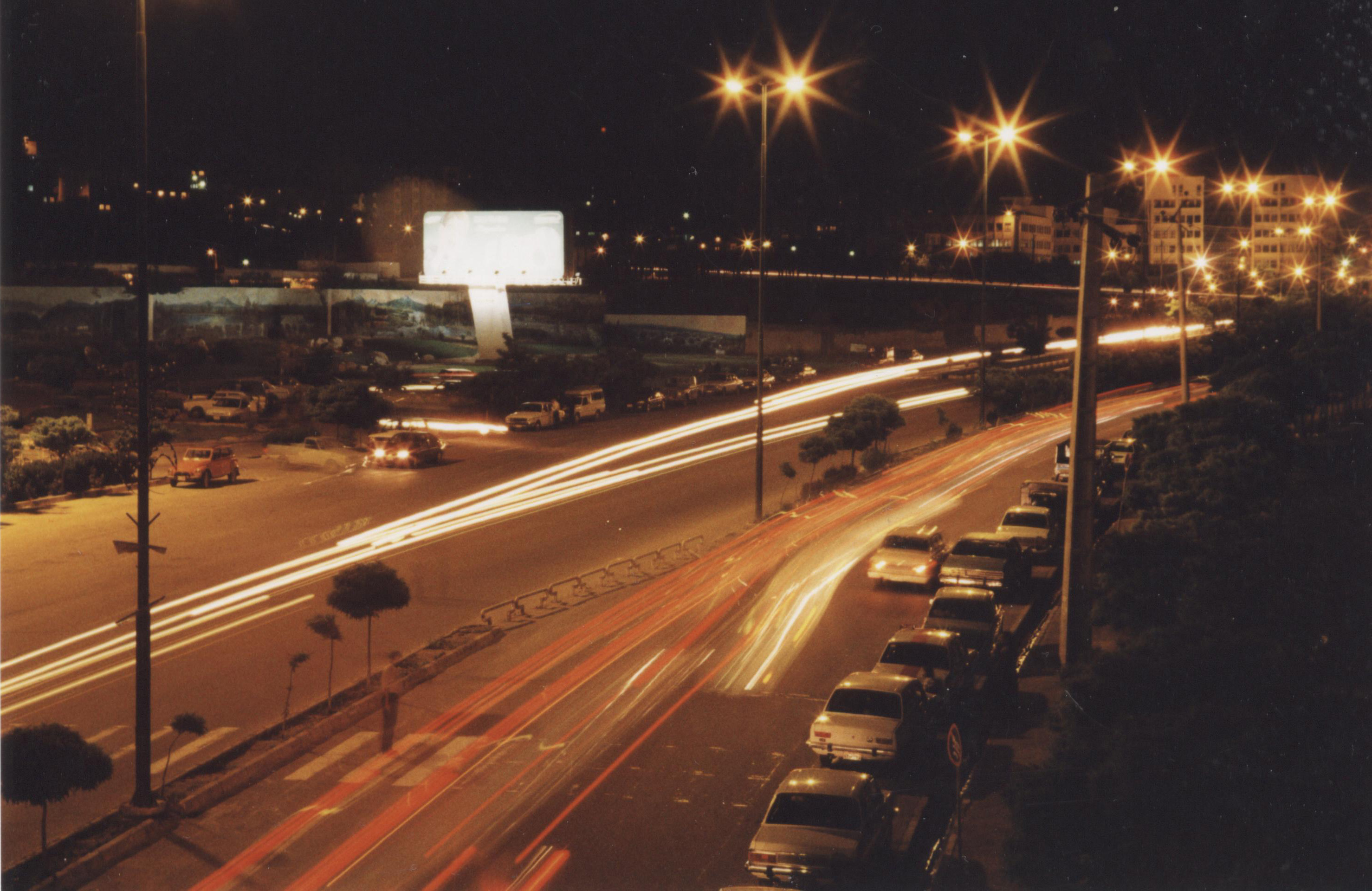
Chay kenar (river side) at night

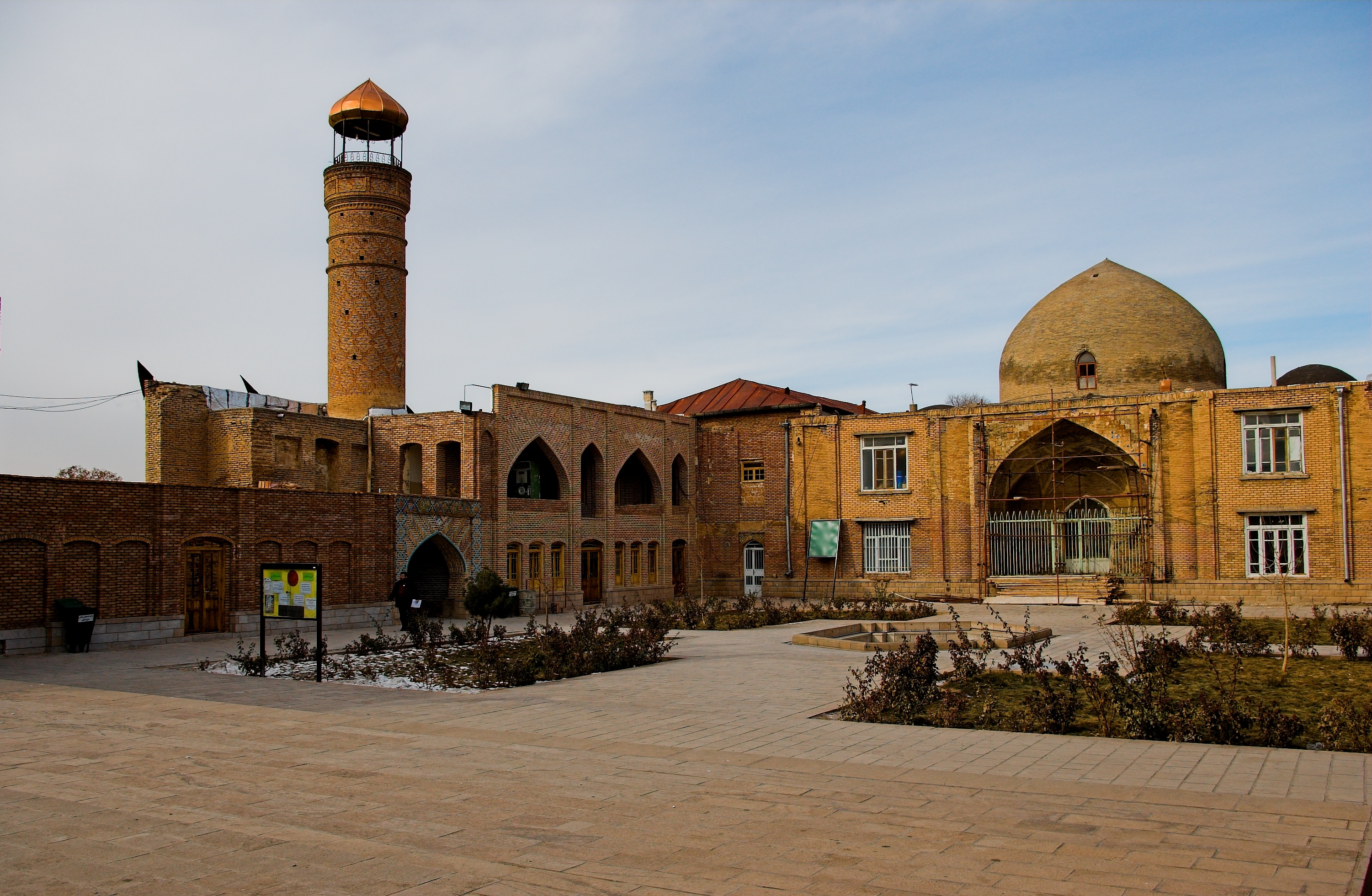
Seyed Hamzeh shrine and mosque

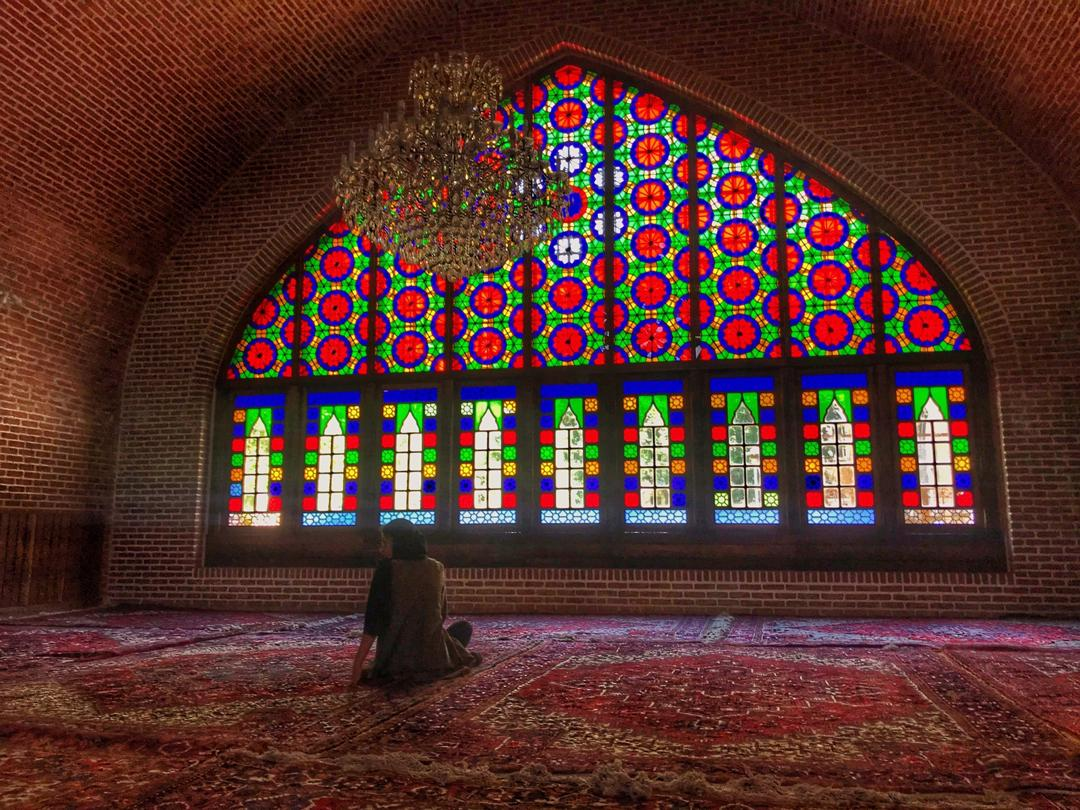
a mosque in Tabriz

== Gardens, green spaces, and parks ==
Tabriz has 132 parks, including 97 small parks, 31 regional and 4 city parks. According to 2005 statistics, the area of parks in Tabriz is 2,595 km^{2}, and the area of green spaces of Tabriz is 8,548 km^{2}, which is 5.6 sq.m per person. A study published in 2018 found that "Most of the urban green spaces are located on the urban fringes and in low-density higher income residential areas." It also found that "Greenspace per capita provision in Tabriz is much lower than the national and international standards (some districts offer only 0–1 sq.m. per capita green space)..." Another study notes that the cohesion of Tabrizi green spaces is strongest in the Southern and Eastern parts of the city, and poorest in the center of the city, following the river Quri Chay. The oldest park in Tabriz, Golestan Baği, was established at first Pahlavi's era in the city center. Tabriz also has 8 traveller-parks with the capacity of 10,000 travellers.

- Baghlar Baghi
- Khaqani Park
- Ghaem Magham
- Golestan Park
- Mashrouteh Park Saeb Tabrizi Garden
- Shah Goli Park
- Shams Tabrizi Garden
- Eynali state forest park.
- Baghmesha Park.
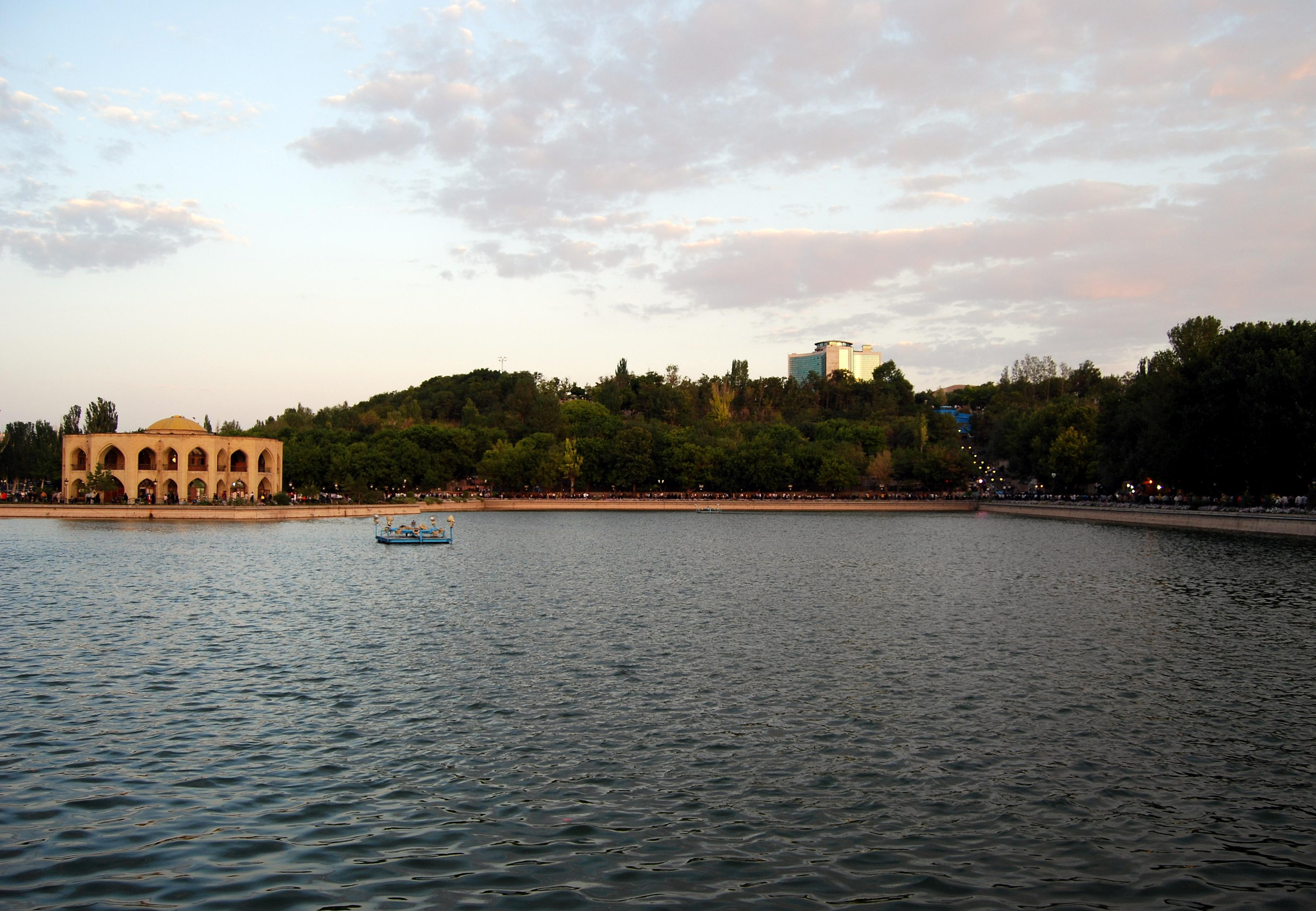
Shah Goli Park

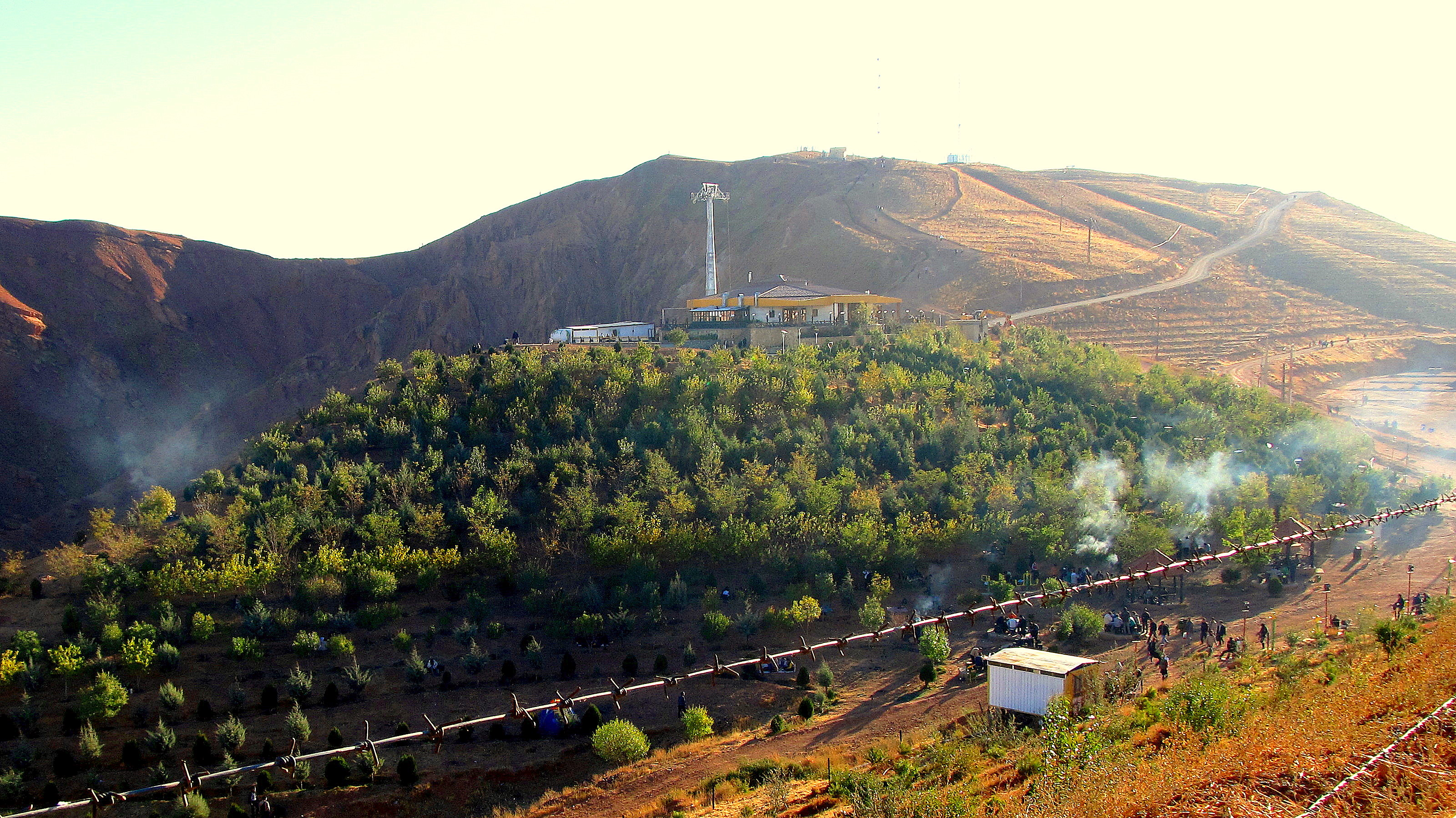
Eynali artificial forest in the north of the Tabriz

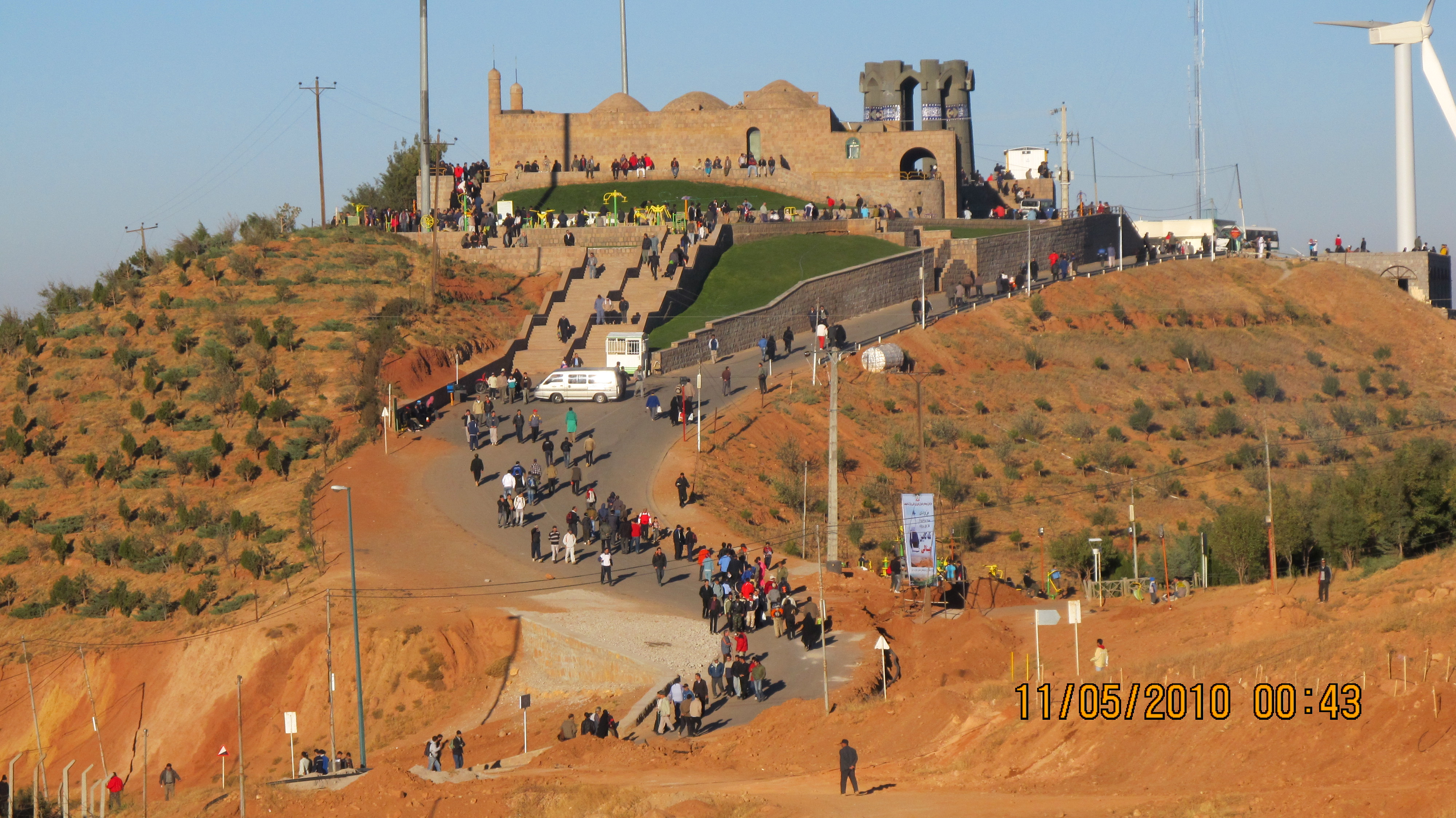
A week-end ritual at Eynali peak

== Economy ==
Tabriz is the largest economic center in Northwest Iran. The economy of Tabriz is based on commerce, services, health care and pharmaceutical, small and heavy industries, and handcrafts. Tabriz is the main site for five of Iran's Fortune 100 companies including: ITMCO, Palaz Moket, Kashi Tabriz, Shirin Asal, Aydin.

=== Industries ===
Modern industries in Tabriz established since early 20 century by match manufacturing industries. Currently manufacturing industries in the city include manufacturing of machinery, vehicles, chemicals and petrochemical materials, refinery, cement, electrical and electronic equipment, home appliances, textiles and leather, nutrition and dairy, woodcraft, and pharmaceuticals.

There are hundreds of industrial complexes in Tabriz's industrial area. Among them is the Iran Tractor Manufacturing Co (ITMCO) which is one of the biggest industrial complexes in the region. This complex alone has the highest foundry and forging capacity in the Middle East and it is the biggest tractor manufacturer in Iran with several production branches within Iran and other countries. Behind ITMCO there are several other industrial complexes including Mashin Sazi Tabriz Co, Iran Diesel Engine Manufacturing Co (IDEM), Pump Iran, Tabriz Petrochemical Complex, Tabriz Oil Refinery and a couple of industrial regions which include hundreds of small industries.

Tabriz is also a site for abundant food and some of the most famous chocolate factories in Iran which honoured the city as the Chocolate City of Iran. This includes Dadash and Baradar Industrial Co. with the brand mark of Aidin, Soniz which is one of the biggest factories of its kind in the region.

A vast portion of the city's population is involved in small businesses like shoemaking ateliers, stone-cutting, furniture ateliers, confectionery, printing and dry nuts.

=== Handcrafts and ateliers ===
Due to its distinct handicrafts and carpets Tabriz is selected as the world city of crafts and carpet. Tabriz is the main centre for the production of the famous Iranian Rugs. The distinctive durability of Tabriz's carpets and its unique designs made it a famous brand in the world's carpet markets. Tabrizi rugs and carpets usually have ivory backgrounds with blue, rose, and indigo motifs. They often feature symmetrical and balanced designs. They usually have a single medallion that is surrounded by vines and palmettos. One of the main quality characteristics of Tabriz rugs is the weaving style, using specialities that guarantee the durability of the rug in comparison for example with Kashan rugs. Therefore, most discussion surrounding Tabrizi rugs is on their high quality and durability instead of their traditional designs. However, Tabrizi rug patterns are not as easily identifiable as other cities' rug patterns as they are less distinctive, unlike Isfahan and Shiraz rugs, and most, if not clearly labeled Tabrizi, are assumed Tabrizi and met with labels like "probably Tabrizi."

Other than carpets, the city is famous for several other handicrafts including silverwares, wood engraving, pottery and ceramics, Ghalamzani (Irania style of toreutics), Moarraq (Iranian style of Mosaic), Monabbat, embroider.

Common Tabrizi rug, garden pattern, bright colors on cream background

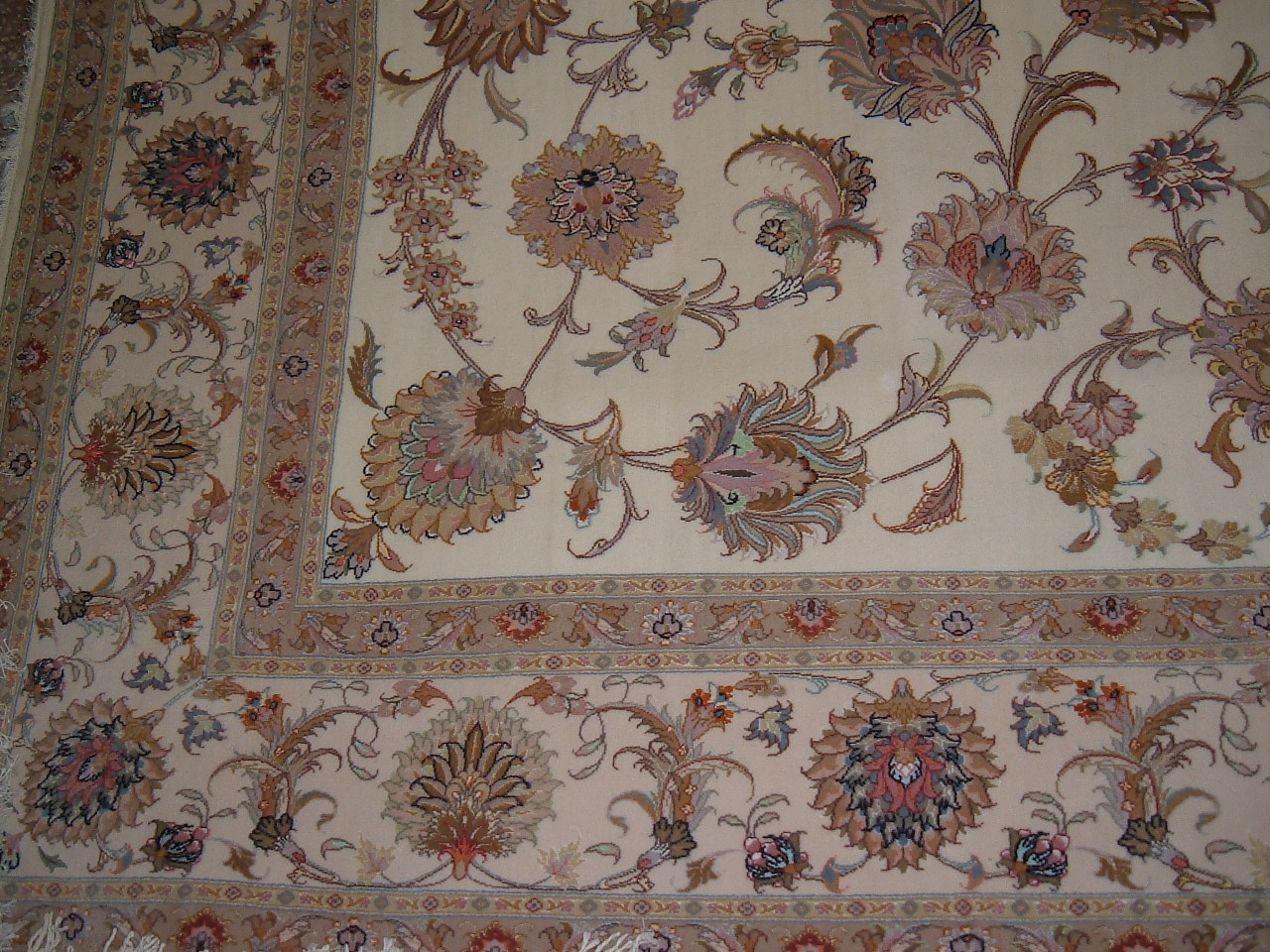
A sample of Tabriz rugs

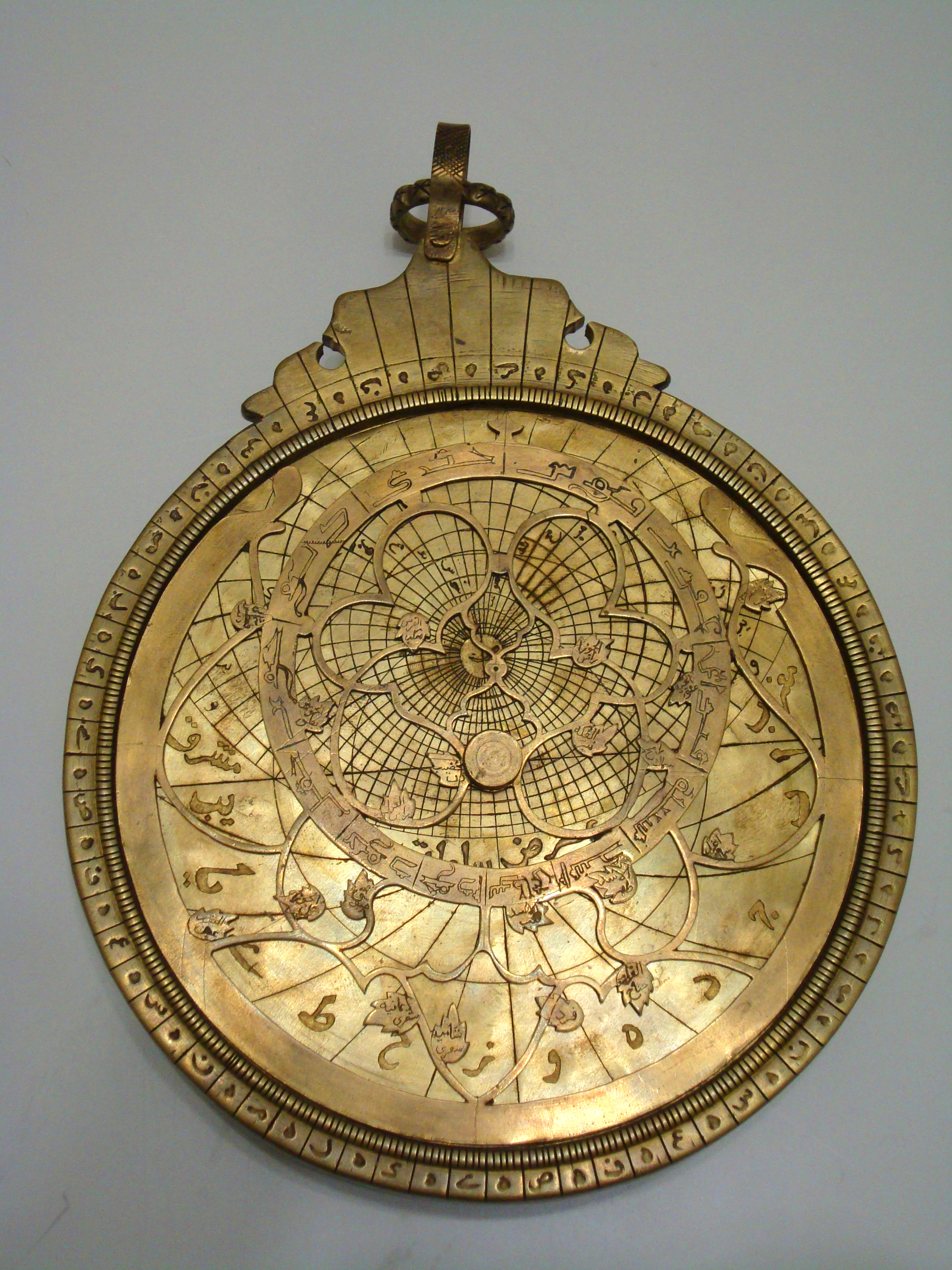
A newly made bronze astrolabe, as a sample of Ghalamzani in Tabriz

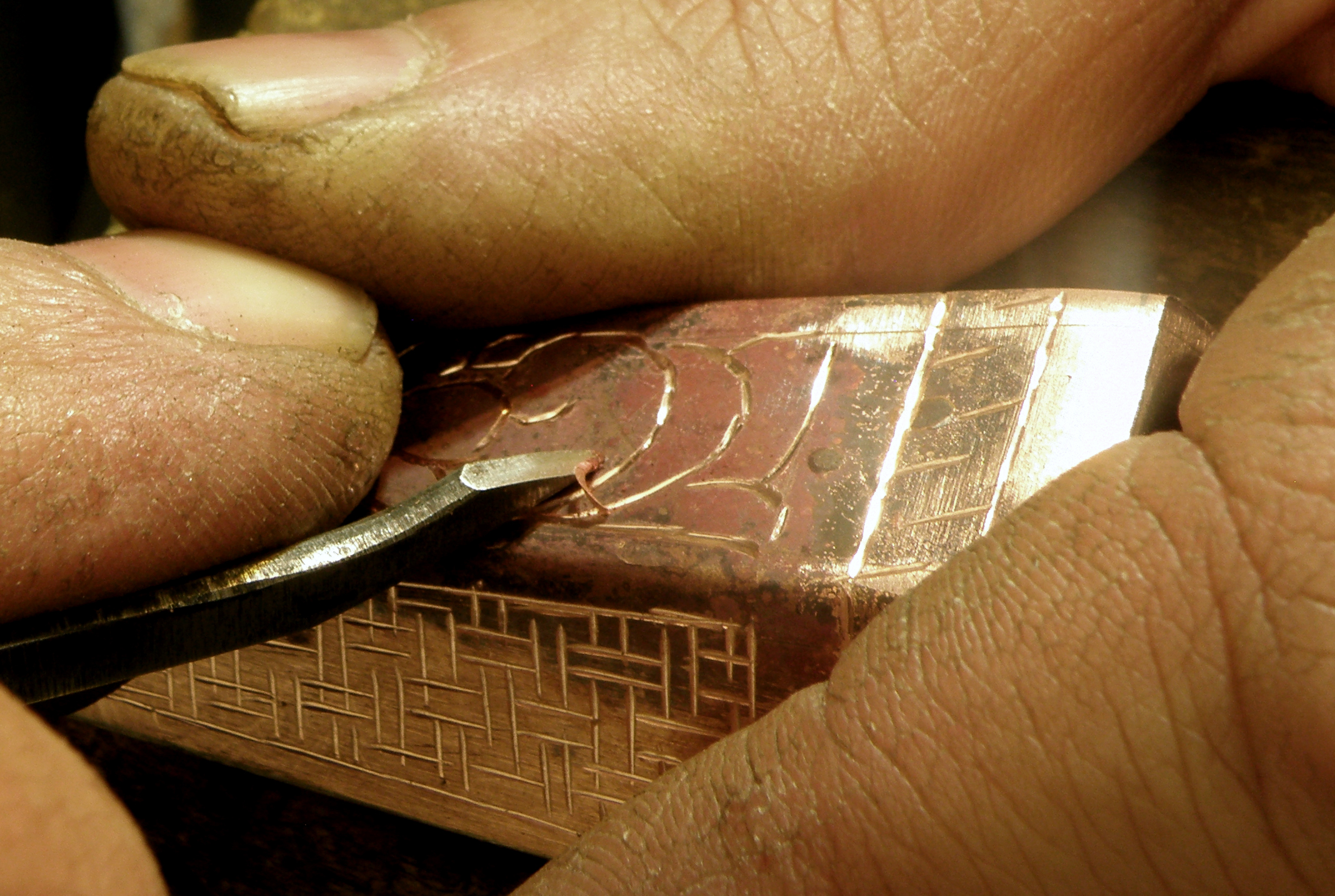
An engraver in Tabriz

=== Shopping ===
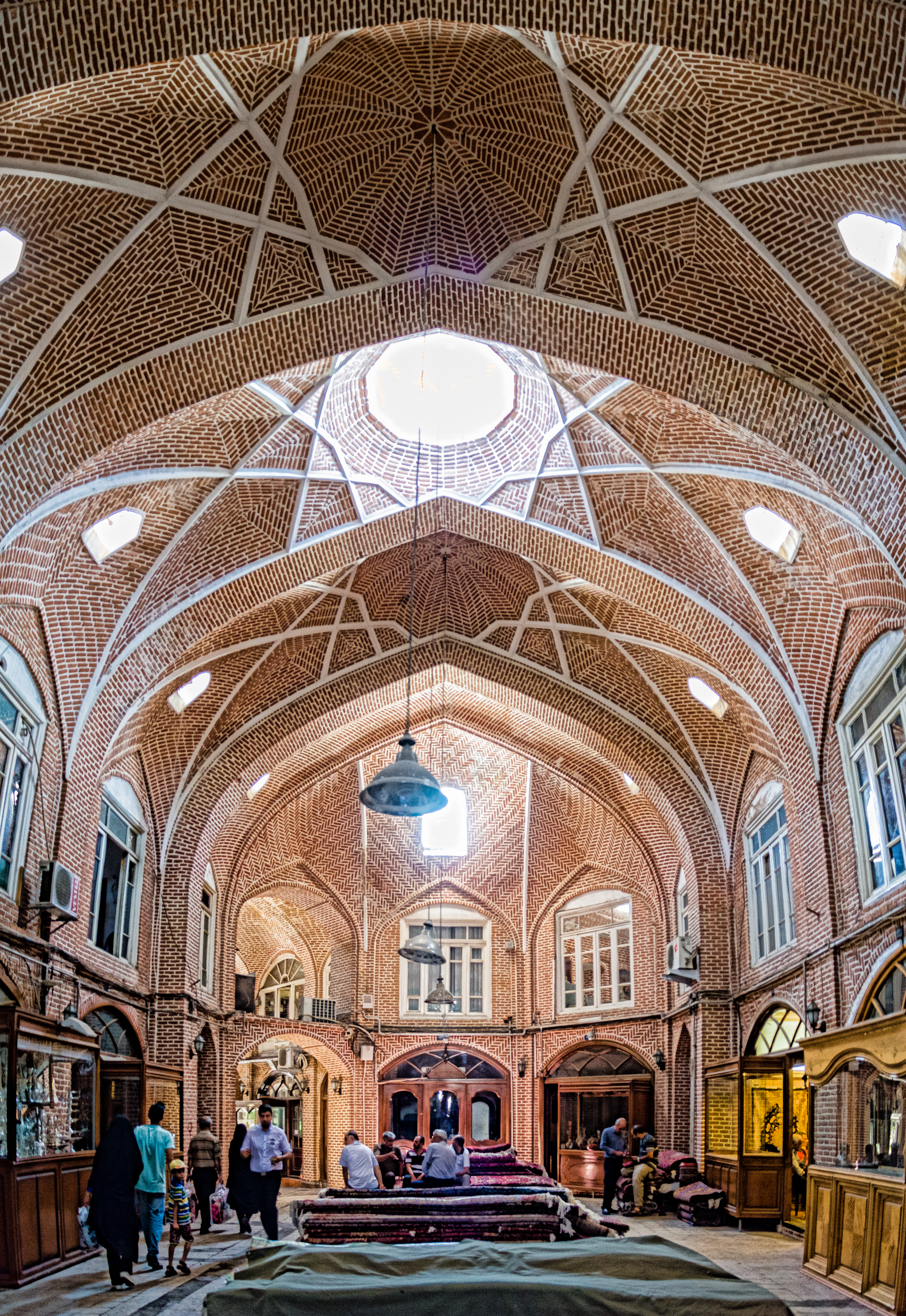
Carpet bazaar

Shopping centres are mostly located in the city centre, including Grand Bazaar of Tabriz, pedestrian malls on Tarbiyat street, Shahnaz street and Ferdowsi street. There are also many shopping malls and luxury boutiques with jewelry, rugs, clothes, handicrafts, confectionery, nuts, and home appliances in the Abresan intersection, the Roshdiyeh district, and the Kouy Valiasr district .

The special feature of Tabriz's malls is that most of them are designated to a particular order, such as home appliances, jewelry, shoes, clothes, wedding ceremonies, ladies/babies/men specialties, leather products, handicrafts, agricultural products, computers, electronic components, industrial equipment, piping equipment, chemical materials, agricultural machines, stationery, books, rugs, construction stuff and others.

Likewise, there are seasonal/occasional shopping fairs opened mainly in the Tabriz International Exhibition Center.

The city is served by Refah Chain Stores Co., Iran Hyper Star, Isfahan City Center, Shahrvand Chain Stores Inc., Kowsar Market, Ofoq Kourosh chain store.

=== Tabriz International Exhibition Center ===
Tabriz International Exhibition Center which is located in the eastern part of the city holds tens of exhibitions based on yearly schedule. The most famous fair is TEXPO which is a general trade fair. Established in 1992, it usually holds exhibitions around August 4–9 every year.

== Schools and libraries ==
=== Universities ===
Tabriz is the site for 14 of Iran's most prominent universities and higher education institutes. Established in 1947, University of Tabriz is the most prestigious university in north-western Iran. University of Tabriz is also considered one of five mother universities in the country which works as the regional hub of science for the region. Besides University of Tabriz, there are several other public universities, operating in the city and its suburbs. Among them the famous ones are:

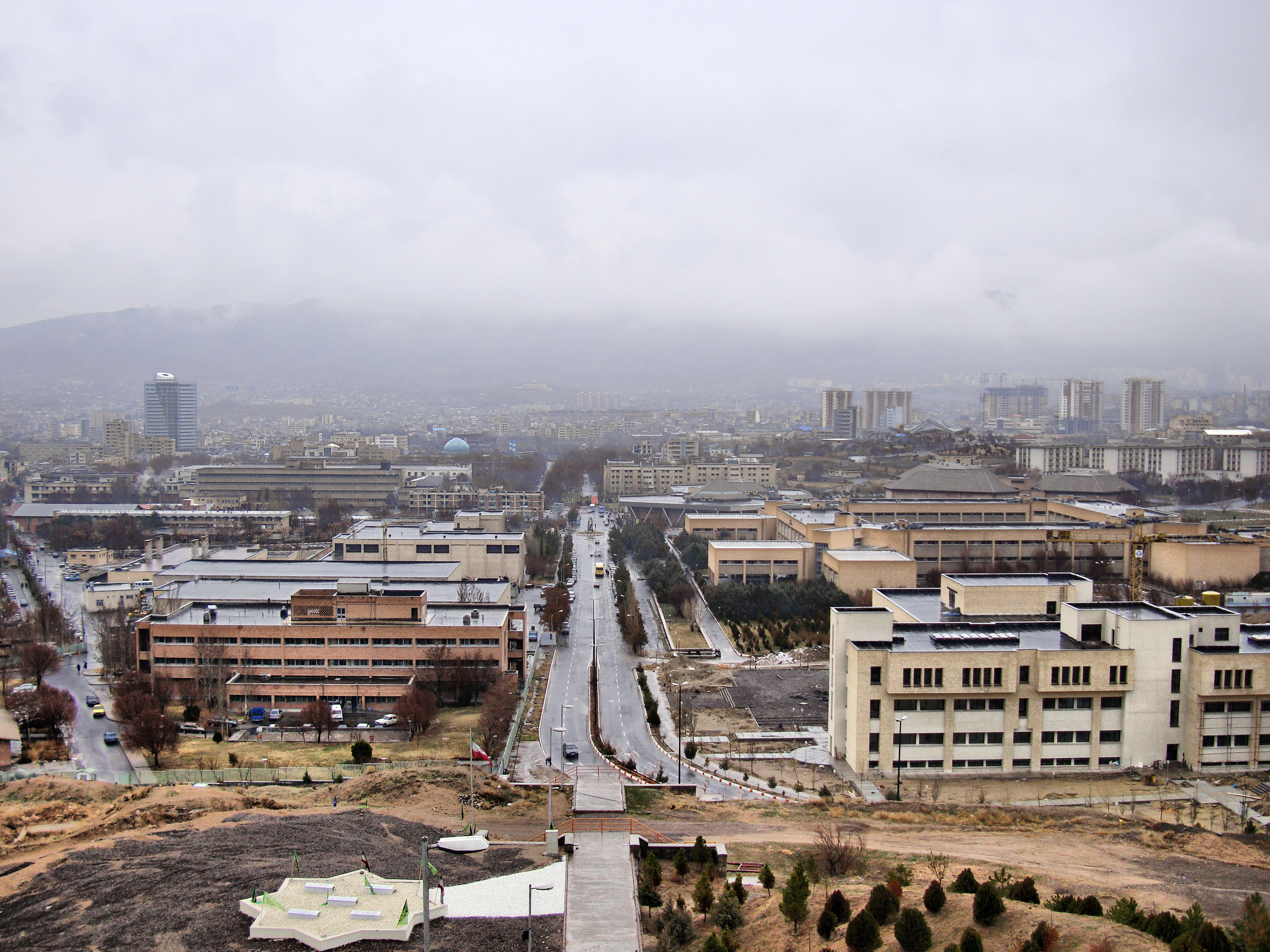
University of Tabriz as seen from the Applied Physics Faculty

Tabriz University of Medical Sciences which branched off the University of Tabriz in 1982 has focus on various medical and paramedical fields. There are several other big universities within Tabriz and its surrounding counties, some of which are listed below:

- Islamic Azad University, Tabriz Branch established in 1982 and have a main campus in east of Tabriz and smaller campuses around the city.
- Sahand University of Technology is established in 1989 and have majored in different fields of Engineering and Technology related sciences.
- Azarbaijan University of Tarbiat Moallem is established in 1987. Azerbaijan University is a general university. Its main campus is located based in Azarshahr county.
- Tabriz Islamic Arts University is a public university established in 1997.
- the Payam-e Noor University of Tabriz, is part of Payame Noor University network of the remote educational university.

There are several private universities and colleges which are also offering higher education. Daneshvaran Higher Education Institute, Seraj Higher Education Institute, University College of Nabi Akram, Khajeh Rashid University.

There are few technical colleges, which serve the students as well: Elmi-Karbordi University of Tabriz, Tabriz College of Technology, Roshdiyeh Higher Education Institute of Tabriz, Jahad Daneshgahi (ACECR) Higher Education Institute (East Azerbaijan Branch), Alzahra College of Technology, State Organization of Technical and Vocational Training.

There are a couple of research centers supported by Iranian government in the city including: East Azerbaijan Park of Science & Technology, Islamic Azad University, Science and Research Branch, Tabriz.

Furthermore, few other of Iranian universities have branches in Tabriz, including: Imam Hossein University, Shahid Beheshti Training Teacher Center of Tabriz.

=== High schools ===
Hundreds of public and private schools serve students using the Iranian education system. Students attend primary school for five years, middle school for three years, and secondary school for a final three years. Those entering university must attend one year in college first. While the prominent language in Tabriz is Azerbaijani, Persian is used in school classrooms. Some of the high schools are famous because of their history or higher educational quality.

Here is a list of some high schools in the city:

- Memorial school (American School of Tabriz) was opened in 1891 and is one of the most famous schools of American Missionary Schools in Iran. After World War II, the school's name was changed to Parvin High School, under Iran education ministry's management. Currently, it is divided into three separate high schools, and the original building is under reconstruction. Howard Baskerville used to teach in Memorial school.
- Roshdieh school is the first modern Iranian school, which was established by Haji-Mirza Hassan Roshdieh. Currently, its building is used as the Tabriz branch of the National Iranian Documents and Library Office.
- Vahdat Technical College is another school in Tabriz. Its programs was developed by the Germans before World War II.
- Ferdowsi high school is one of the largest high schools in Tabriz. The original building was constructed by German engineers before World War II originally as a hospital with an aerial shape of H. Later on, it was used as Ferdowsi high school.
- Mansur High School (established 1945) was one of the highest-ranking schools in Tabriz. Later on, the school divided into Mansur (Taleghani) High School and Motahhari high school. The reconstruction of the school in 2010 has caused tension between alumnus of the school and administrators of the education office of Tabriz.
- Shahid Madani and Farzanegan or so-called Tiz-houshan high schools (which are part of SAMPAD/NODET) were established in 1989. The students are admitted to these schools through a competitive entrance exam.

=== Religious schools ===
Valiasr Religious School and Talebieh Islamic Science School are two major religious schools in the city which are used for teaching Islamic literature.

=== Libraries ===
Tabriz National Library, also known as Central Library of Tabriz, is the largest and the most famous library in the city. The Tabriz National Library has the biggest collection of classic handwritten Persian literature in the northwest region of Iran. There are many other public libraries all around the city such as Tarbiat library, Helal Ahmar, Shahid Motahhari, Shahriyar, Jafarieh, and Farhangsara.

== Infrastructure ==
=== Health systems ===
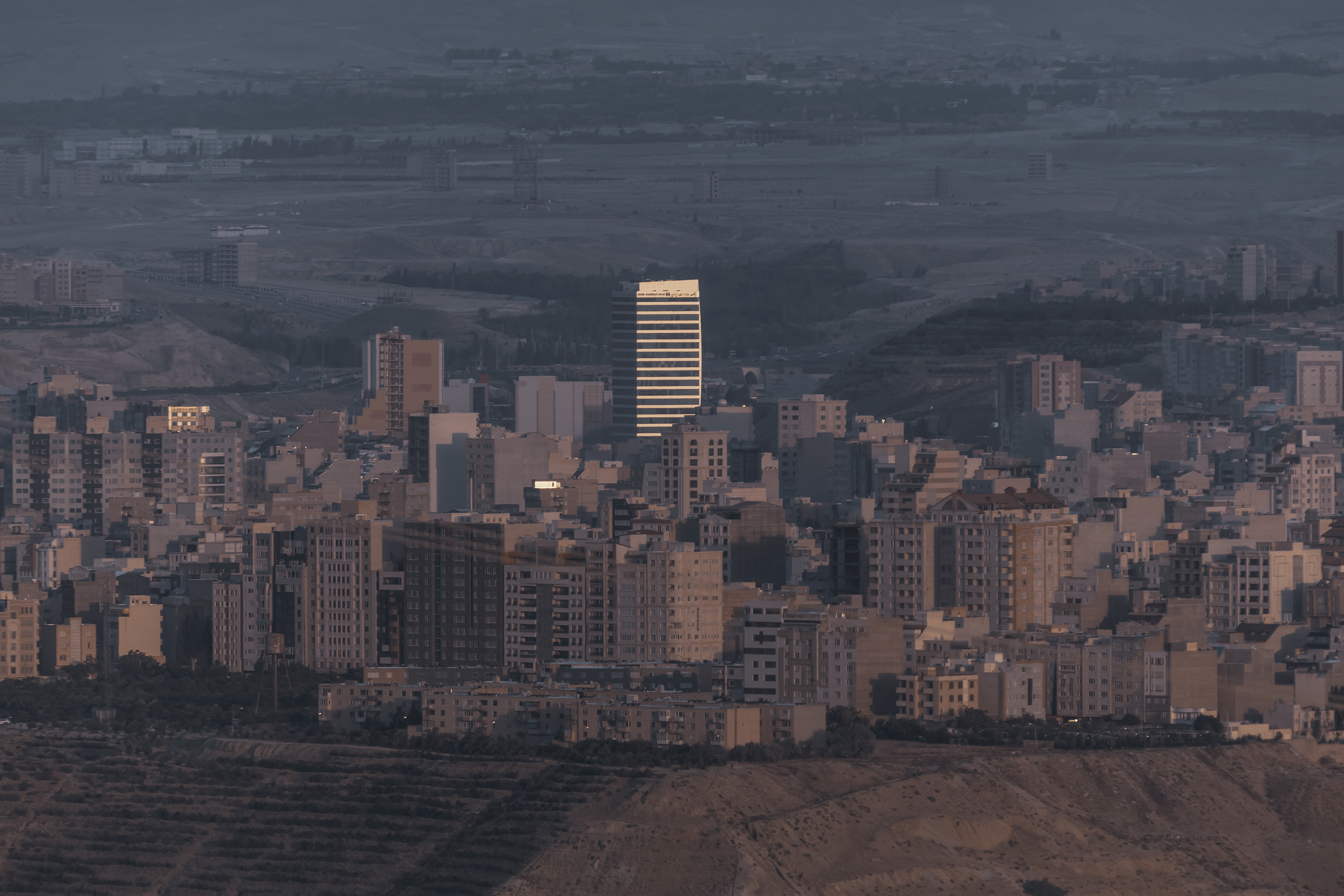
A sunset view of the Vali-e-Asr district in Tabriz.

The Ministry of Health operates most of the public hospitals and health centers in the Tabriz metropolitan region, some of which are aligned with the Tabriz Medical School.

=== Transportation ===
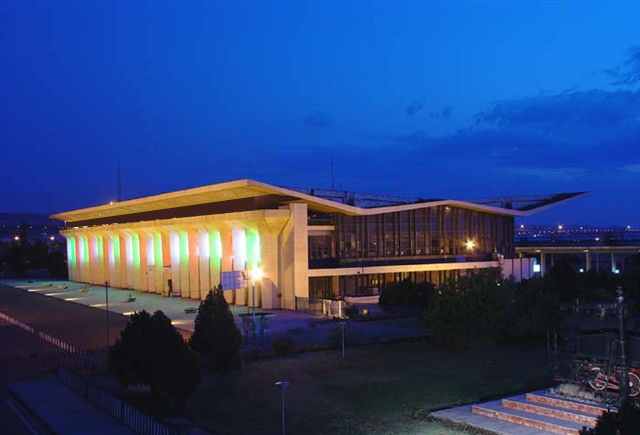
Tabriz Railway Station

Public buses, shuttle taxis, metro, bikes, and personal cars are the main modes of transportation for Tabriz residents. The city has a network of public bus lines that link its districts and some suburbs to the city center. There is also a Bus Rapid Transit (BRT) line that runs for 18 km (11 mi) from the West Train Station to the Baseej Square in the far east of the city.

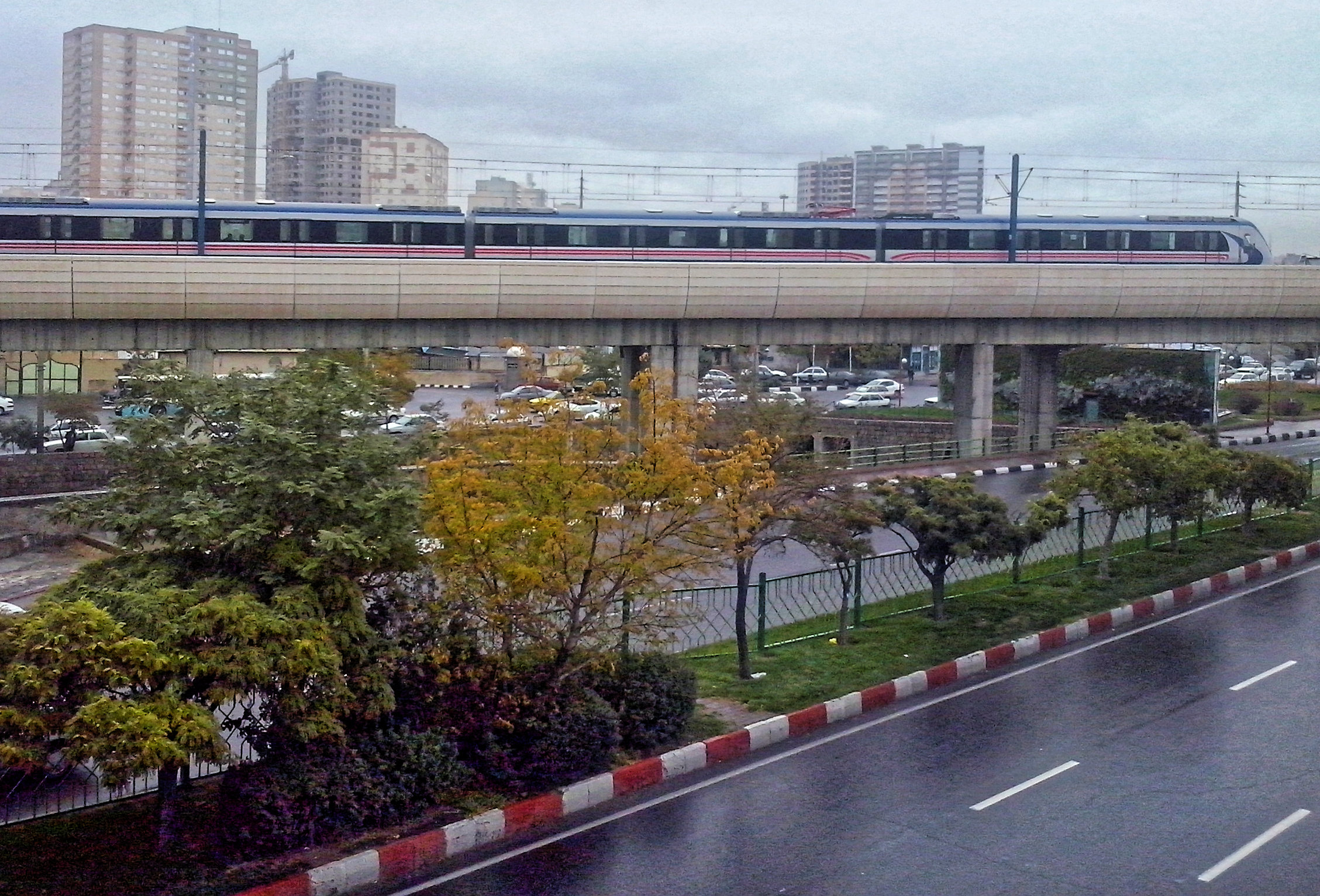
Tabriz Metro

Part of Tabriz subway line 1 is operational since 2015 which goes from Shahgoli to Shahriyar. Several lines are planned to connect districts of Tabriz to its city center however the construction is six years behind the schedule. The government of Iran had planned to finish 6 km (4 mi) of line No.1 of the network in 2006, but this was not achieved due to financial problems and currently only half of the track for the metro line has been laid.

Tabriz is linked to Europe through Turkey's roads and Bazargan (Azerbaijani, Persian: بازرگان ) border. Tabriz is connected to Tehran by Freeway 2 (Iran).

The city is linked to Iran National Railways (IRIR, Persian: رجا ) also to Europe by Turkey's railways via Ghotour (Azerbaijani, Persian قطور) bridge in West Azerbaijan province of Iran. Tabriz was the first city in Iran to be served by railways with the construction of the Tabriz-Jolfa line in 1912–1914 (later converted to broad-gauge in 1916). Tabriz Railway Station is located in the western part of the city, at the end of Khomeyni Street.

Tabriz International Airport opened in 1950 and is the only international airport in East Azerbaijan (since 1991). It has daily and weekly domestic flights to Tehran, Isfahan, Kish Island, Shiraz, and Mashhad. It also has daily and weekly flights to Istanbul, Tbilisi, Baghdad and Baku.

== Sports ==
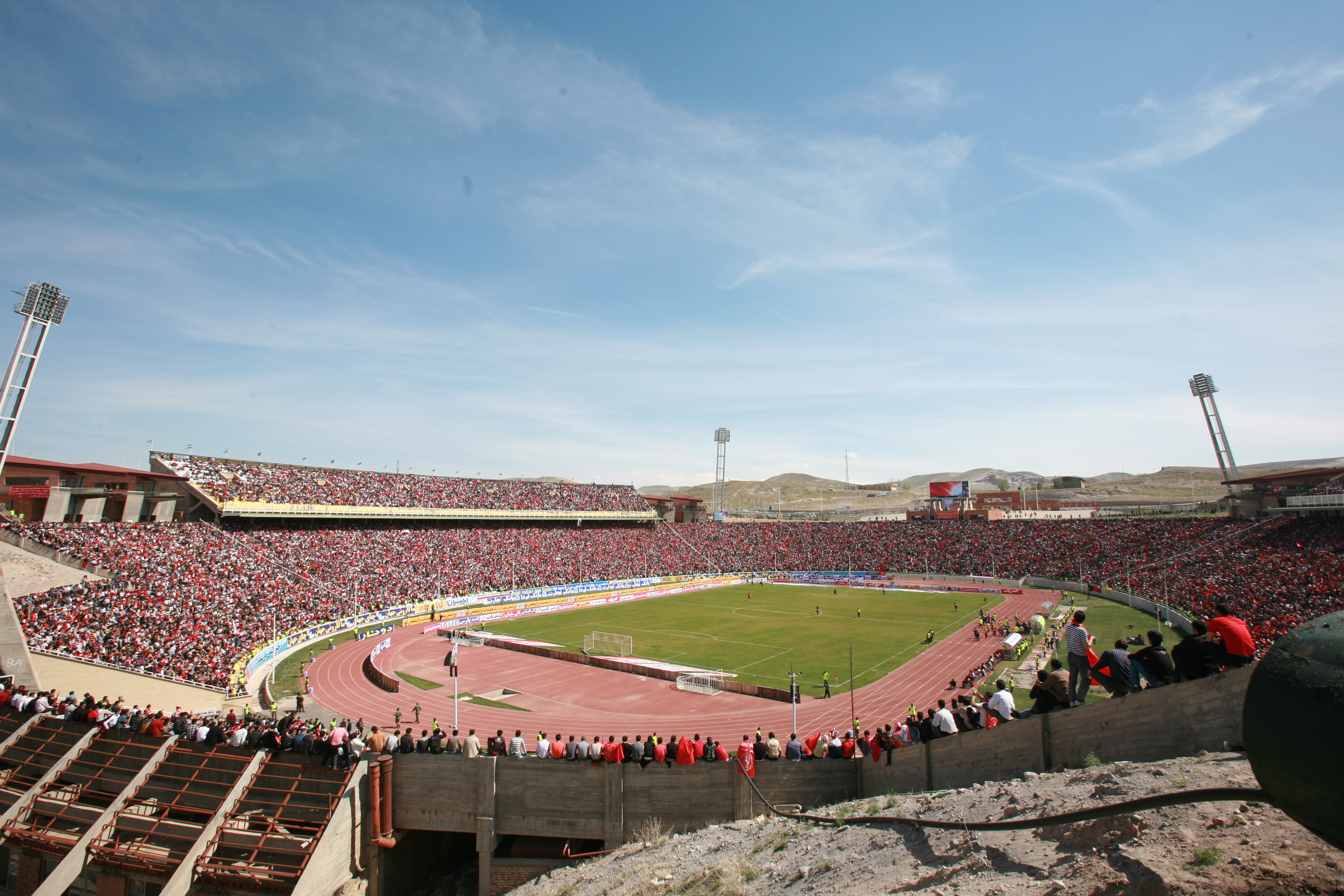
Sahand Stadium in a Tractor football match

=== Football ===
Football is a major part of the city's culture. Tractor SC is one of the most popular football clubs in Iran and Asia. Tractor play in the Iran Pro League. The home stadium for Tractor is the city's major stadium, Sahand Stadium which has the capacity of 80,000 people.

In June 1976 Bagh Shomal Stadium of Tabriz hosted part of the final tournament of the AFC Asian Cup games.

=== Futsal ===
The city's main futsal club is Mes Sungun which was founded in 2010 and plays at the Shahid Poursharifi Arena in the city. The club won most of the Iranian Futsal Super League and won AFC Futsal Championship in 2018.

=== Cycling ===
Tabriz is also home for Azerbaijan Cycling Tour which is held on a yearly based calendar since 1986. This cycling tour is the most prestigious cycling tour in Iran. Tabriz is also home for Tabriz Petrochemical Cycling Team, a cycling team which is competing in UCI-sanctioned competitions through Asian continents.

=== Ski ===
Sahand and Yam ski resorts are located in an hour drive from Tabriz. Depending on the precipitation, both resorts start operation from late December till early March.

== Media ==
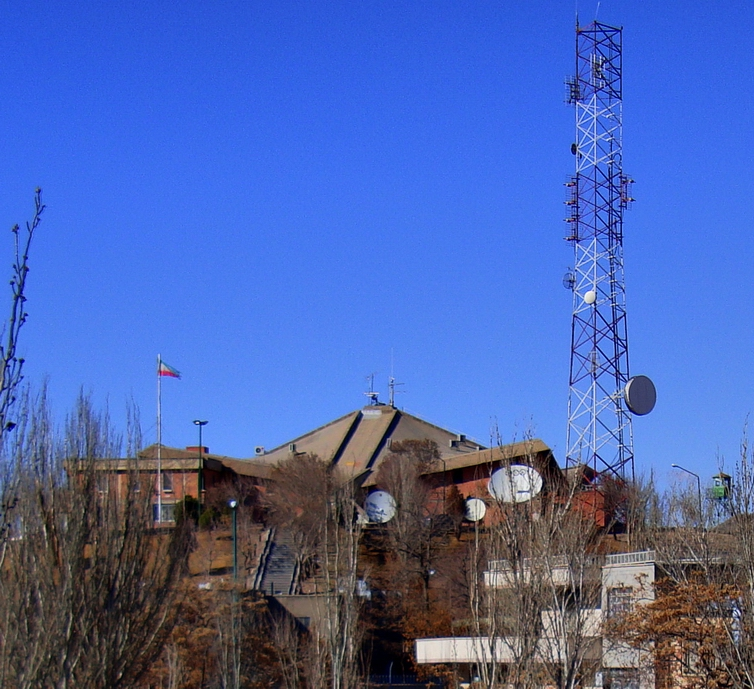
Sahand TV main building

Tabriz has one state television channel called Sahand TV that broadcasts in both Persian and Azerbaijani languages. It broadcasts internationally through the Arabsat and Intelsat satellites.

The city has one government-controlled radio channel broadcasting in both Persian and Azerbaijani languages.

The 14 weekly magazines and 8 main newspapers published in the city include: Amin, Mahd Azadi, Asr Azadi, Fajr Azarbaijan, Saeb Tabriz, Payam Noor, Navaye Misho and Saheb.

== Notable people ==
For a complete list see: Category:People from Tabriz and List of people from Tabriz

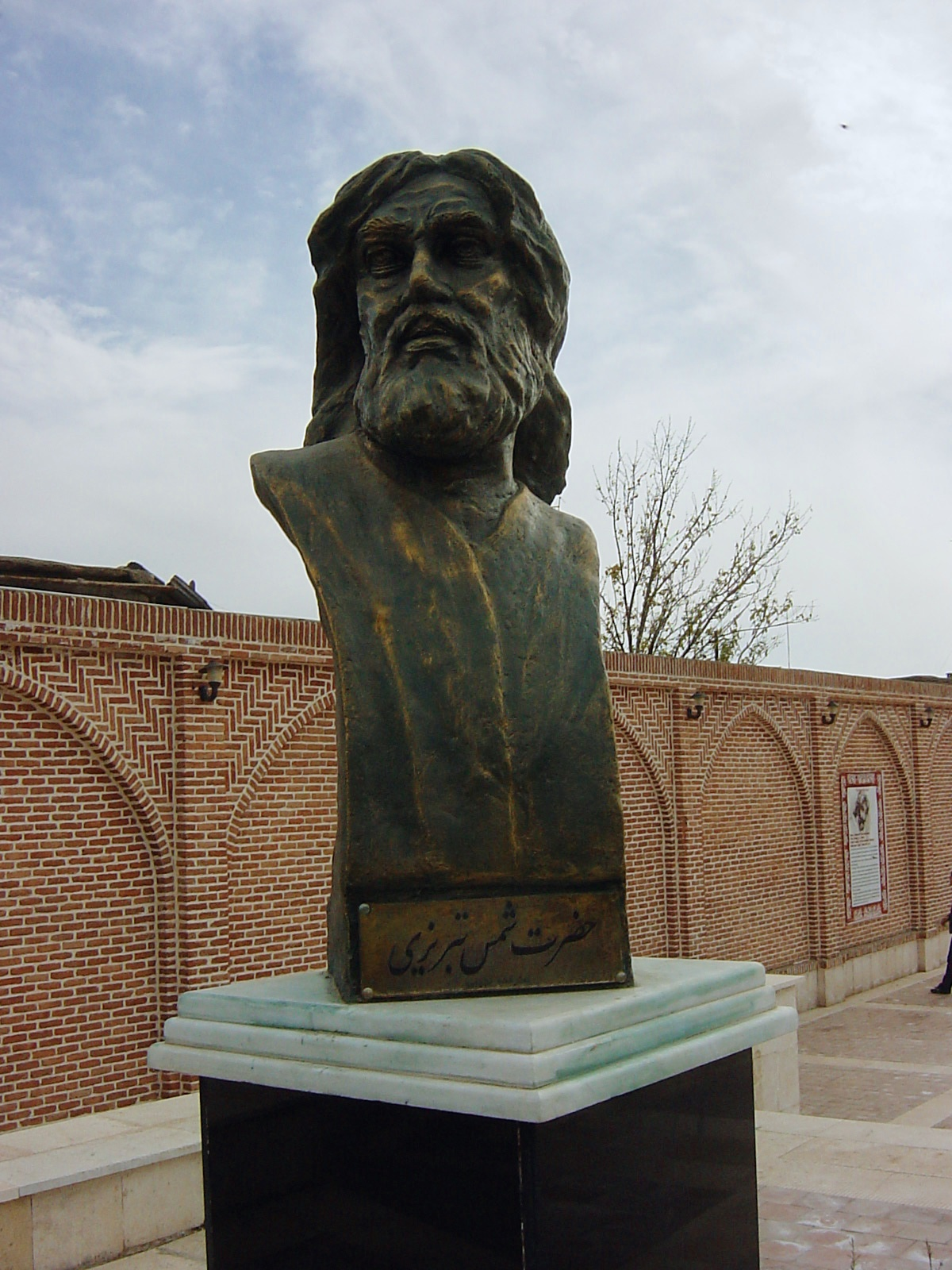
Shams Tabrizi, poet

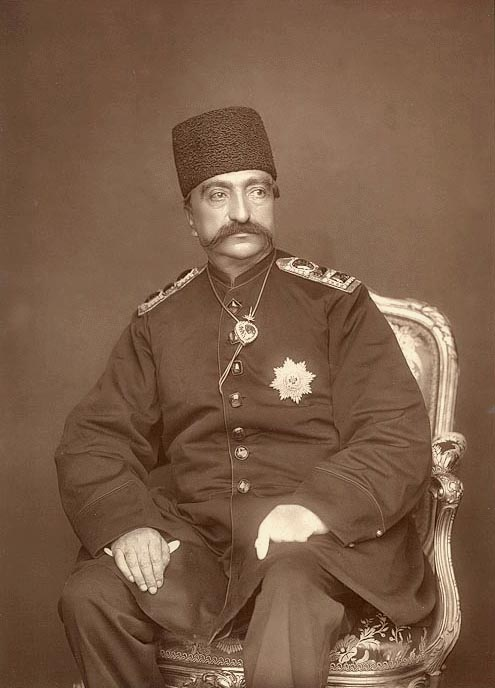
King Naser al-Din Shah Qajar

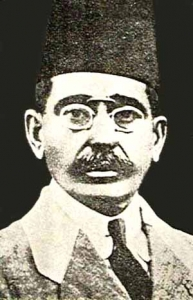
Iraj Mirza, poet

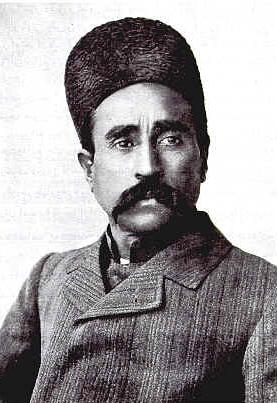
Sattar Khan, a pivotal figure in the Iranian Constitutional Revolution

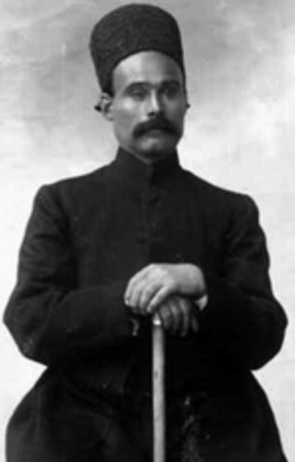
Bagher Khan, a pivotal figure in the Iranian Constitutional Revolution

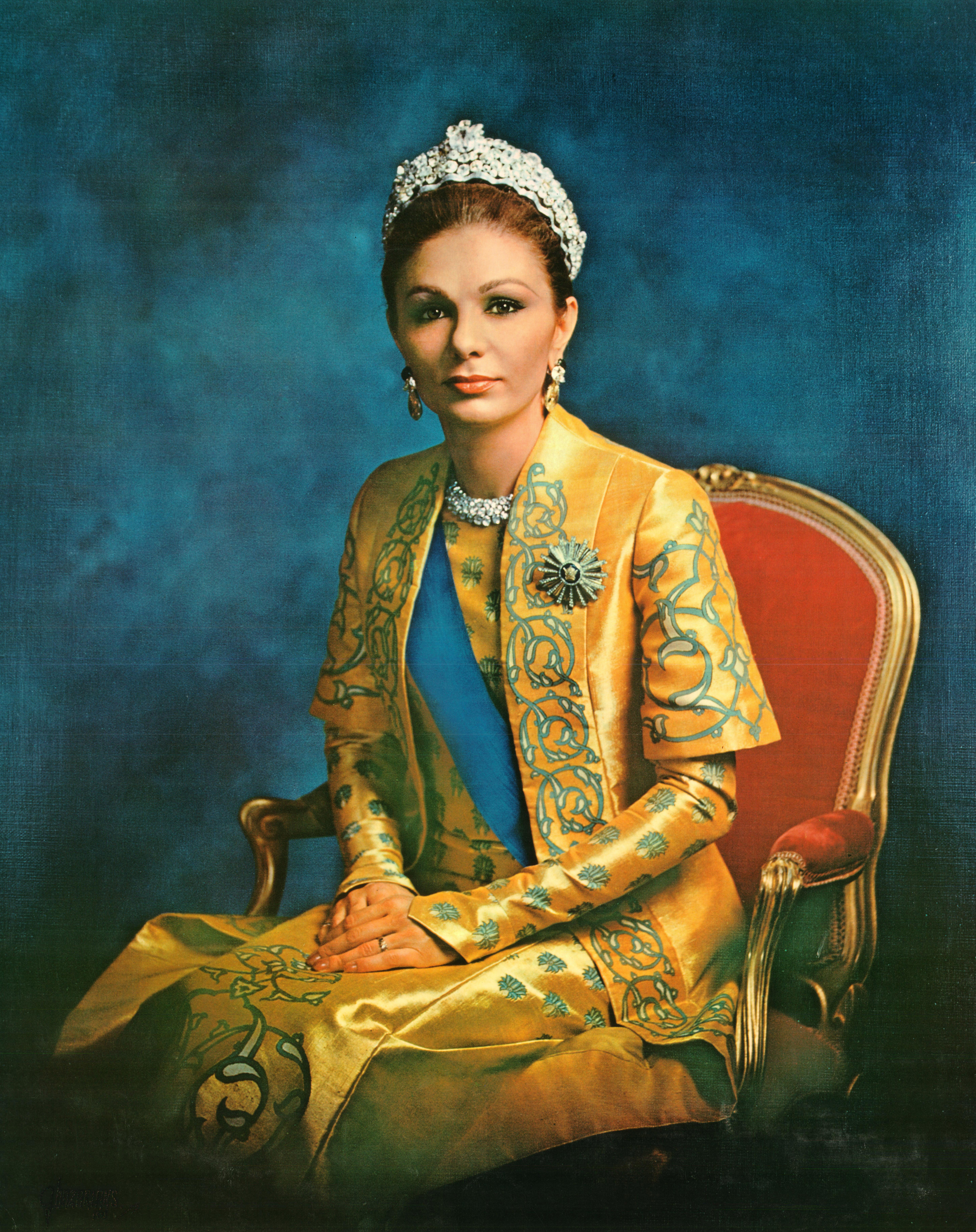
Farah Pahlavi, is the widow of Mohammad Reza Pahlavi and was the Shahbanu (empress) of Iran

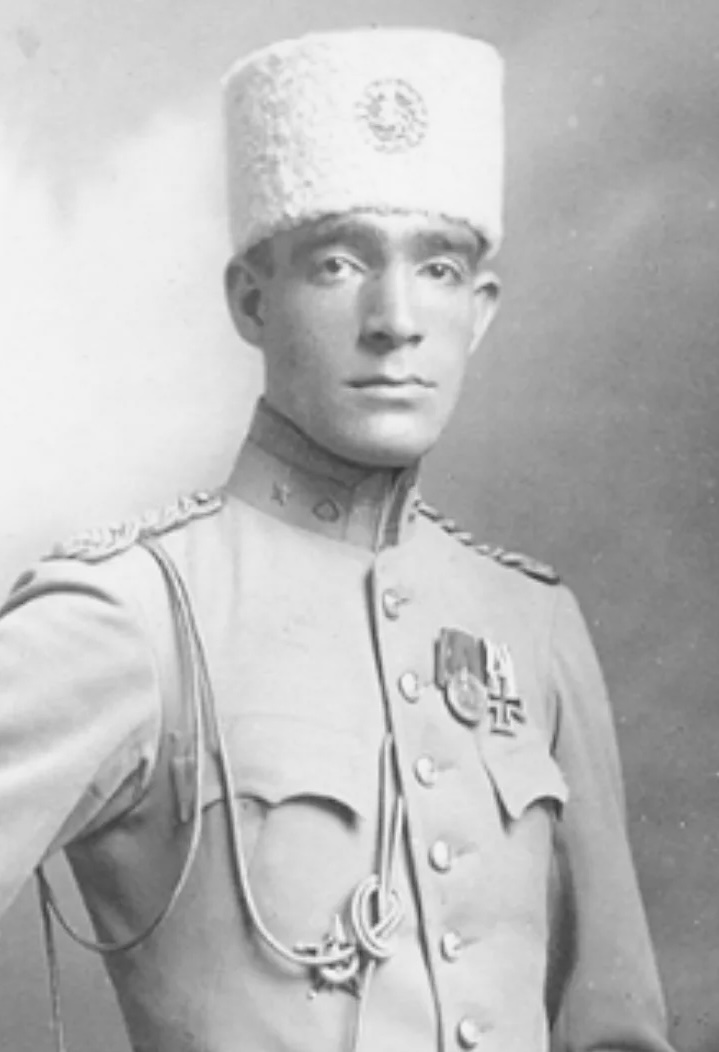
Mohammad Taqi Pessian, gendarme and pilot

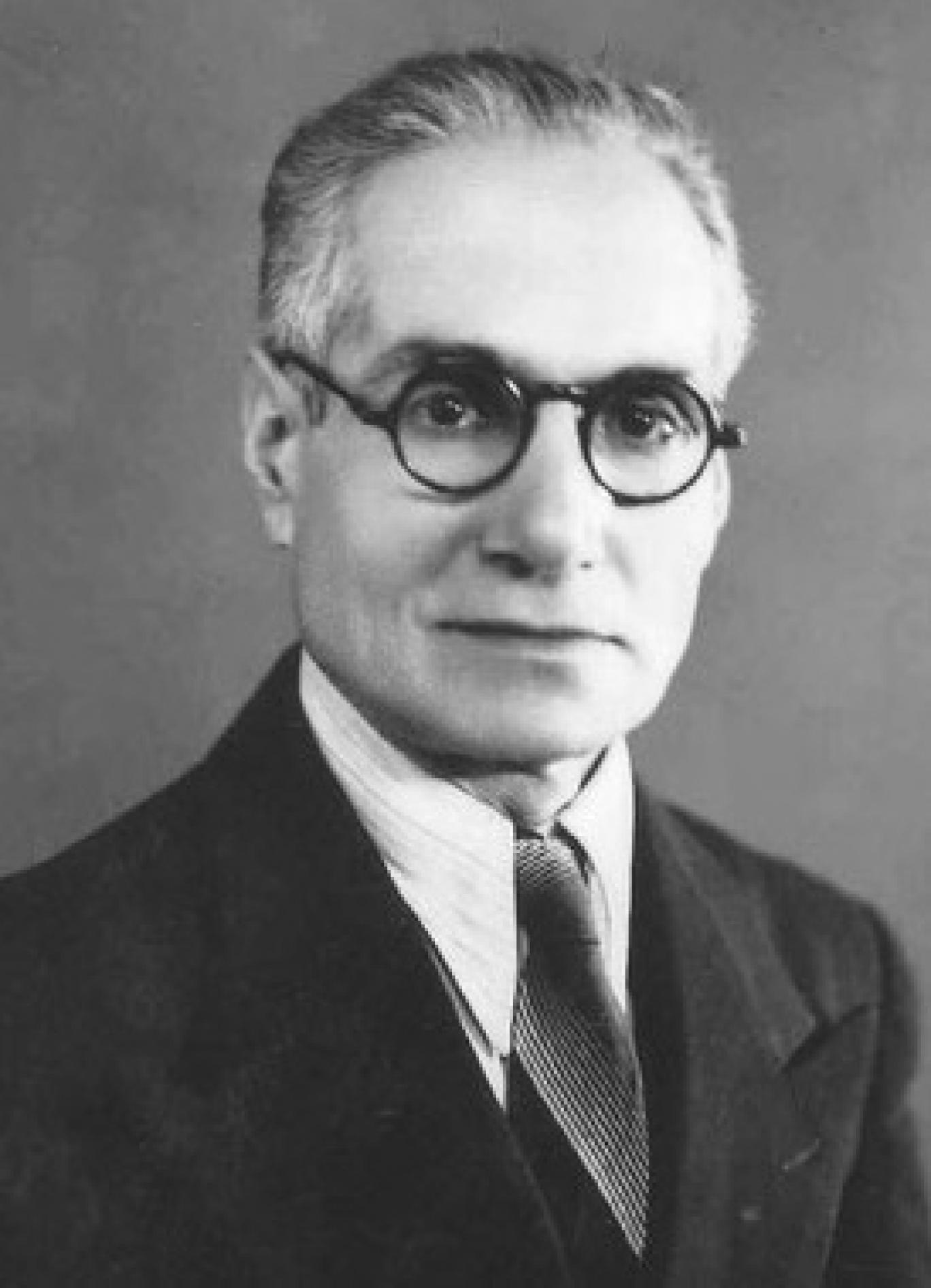
Ahmad Kasravi, linguist, nationalist, religious reformer, historian and cleric

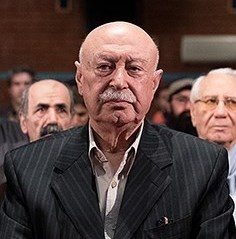
Farhad Fakhreddini composer, conductor and founder of Iran's National Orchestra

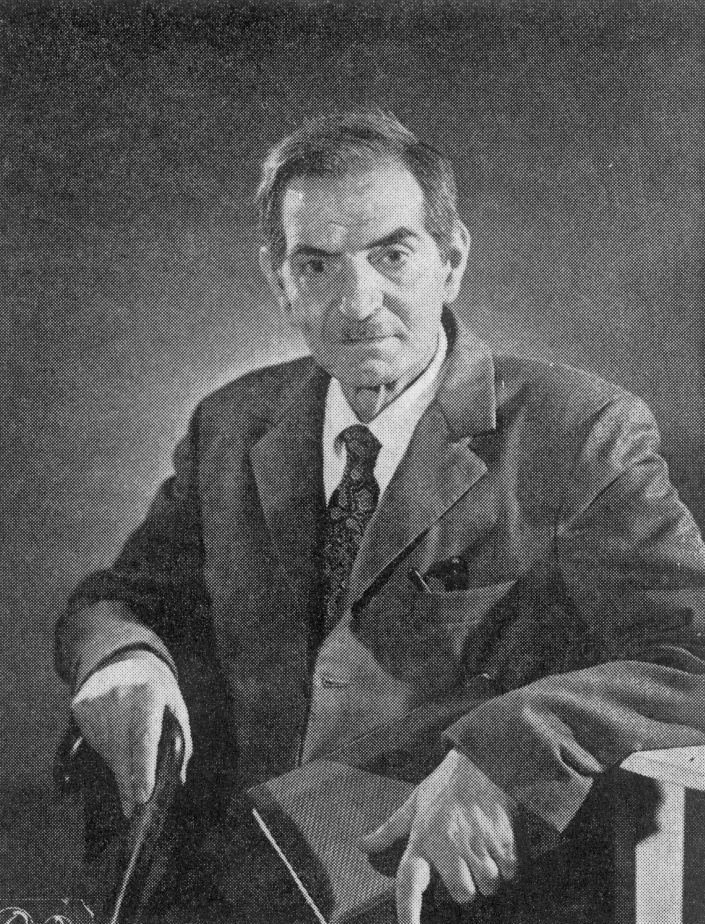
Mohammad-Hossein Shahriar, poet

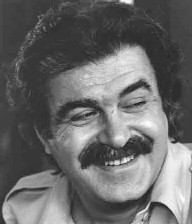
Gholam-Hossein Sa'edi, writer

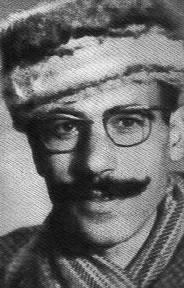
Samad Behrangi, teacher, social critic, folklorist, translator, and writer

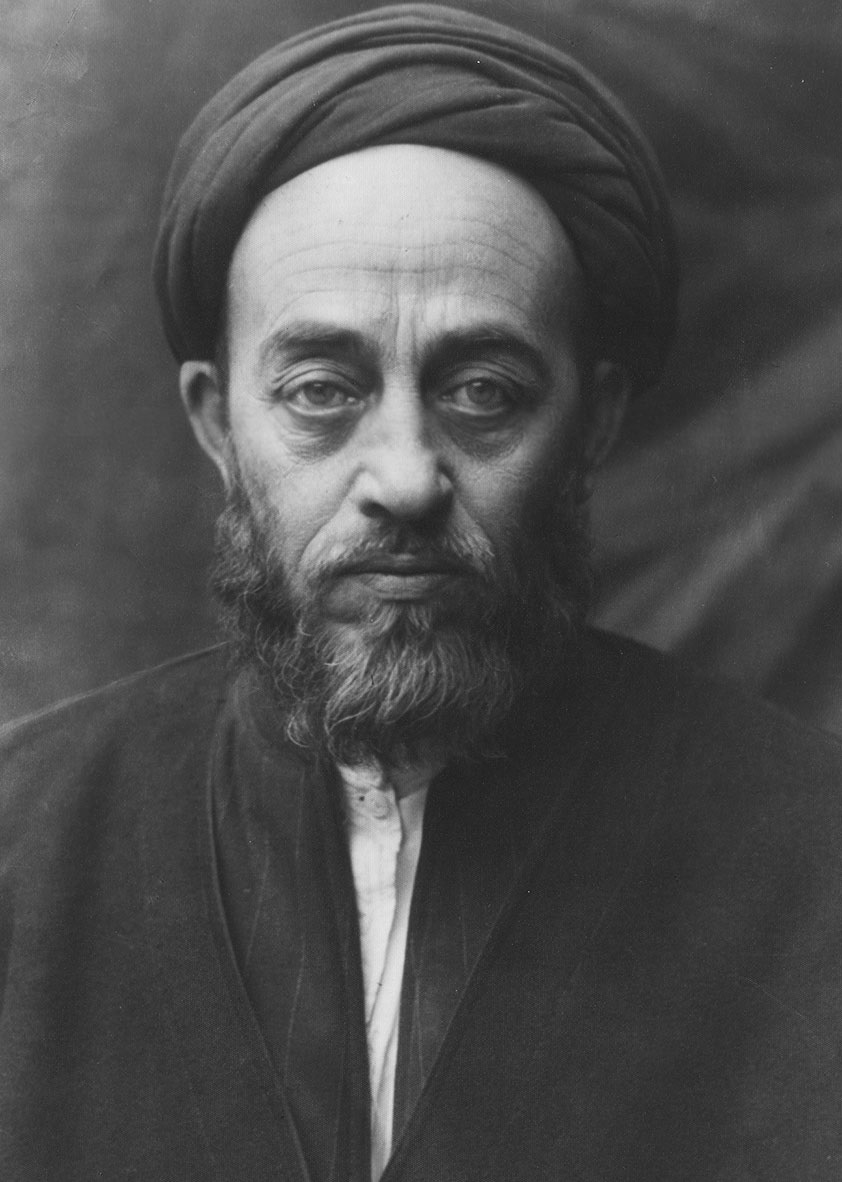
Muhammad Husayn Tabatabai, Allamah

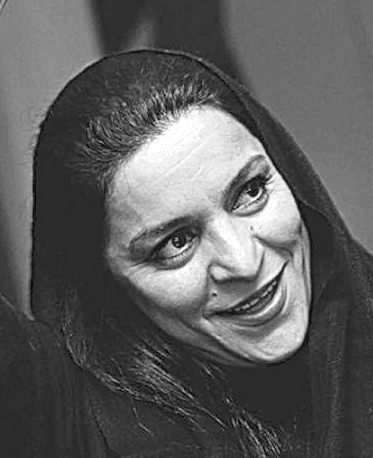
Tahmineh Milani, film director and producer

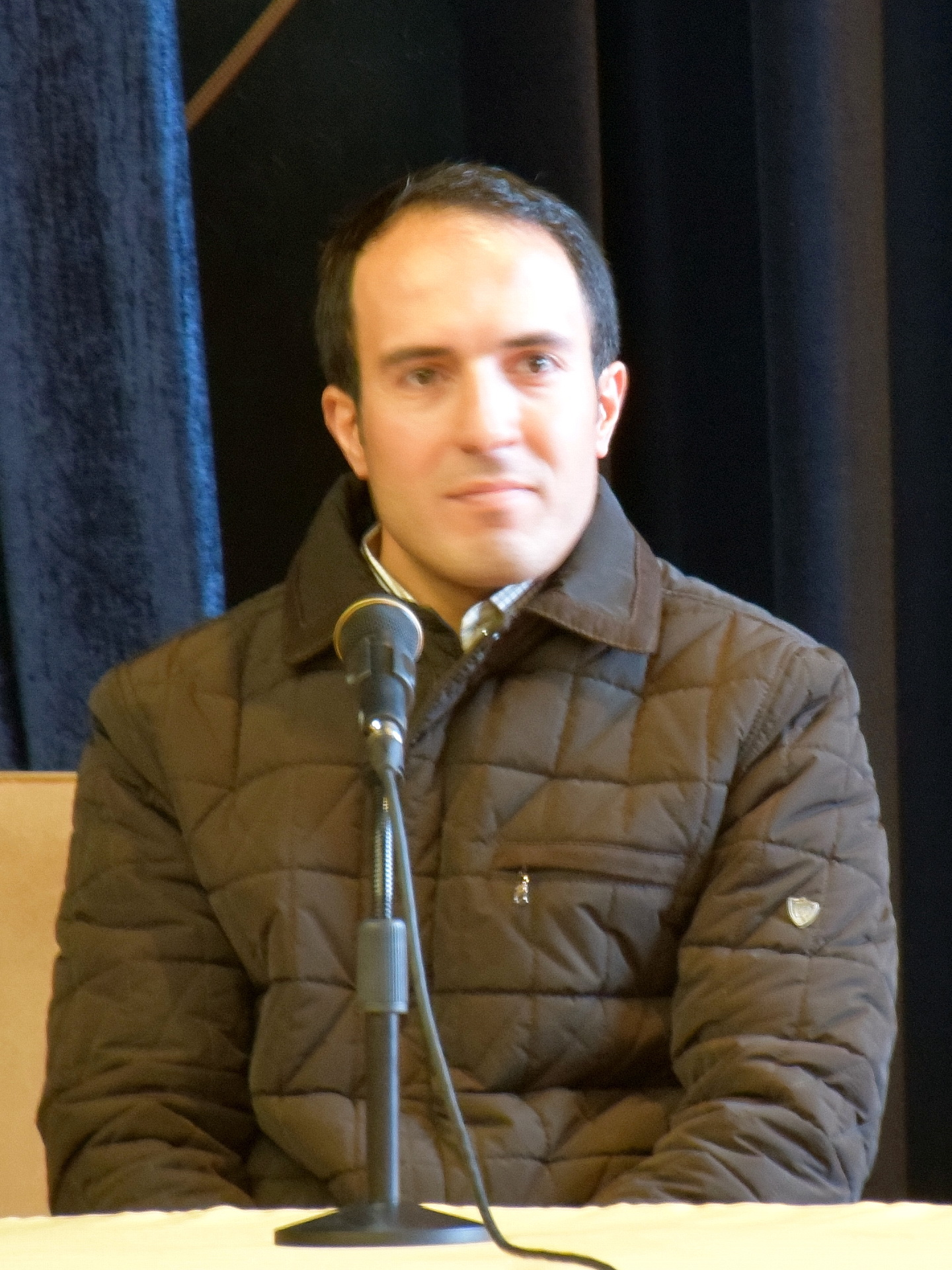
Azim Gheychisaz, mountain climber and summiteer of all 14 Eight-thousanders

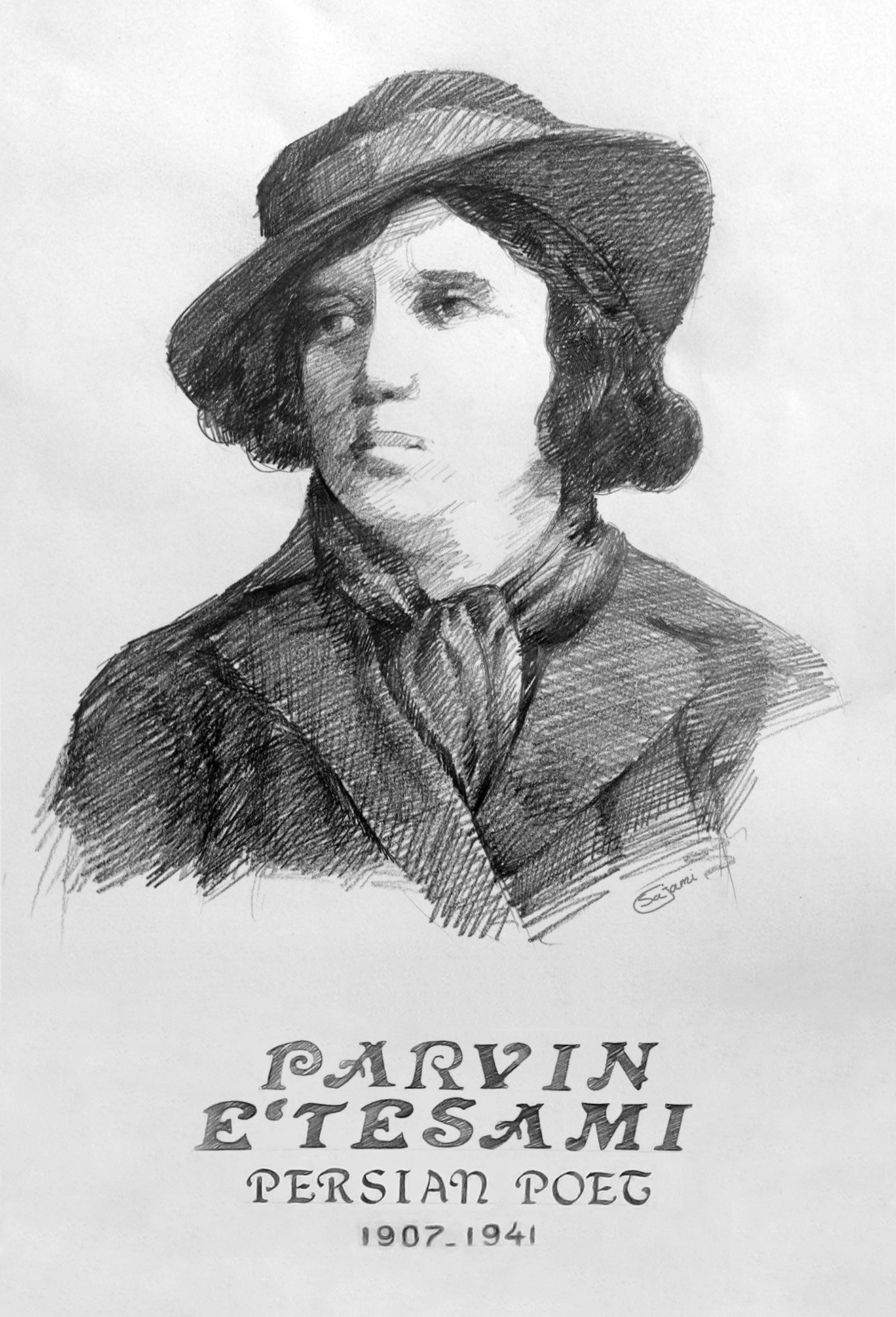
Parvin Etesami, 20th-century Persian poet of Iran

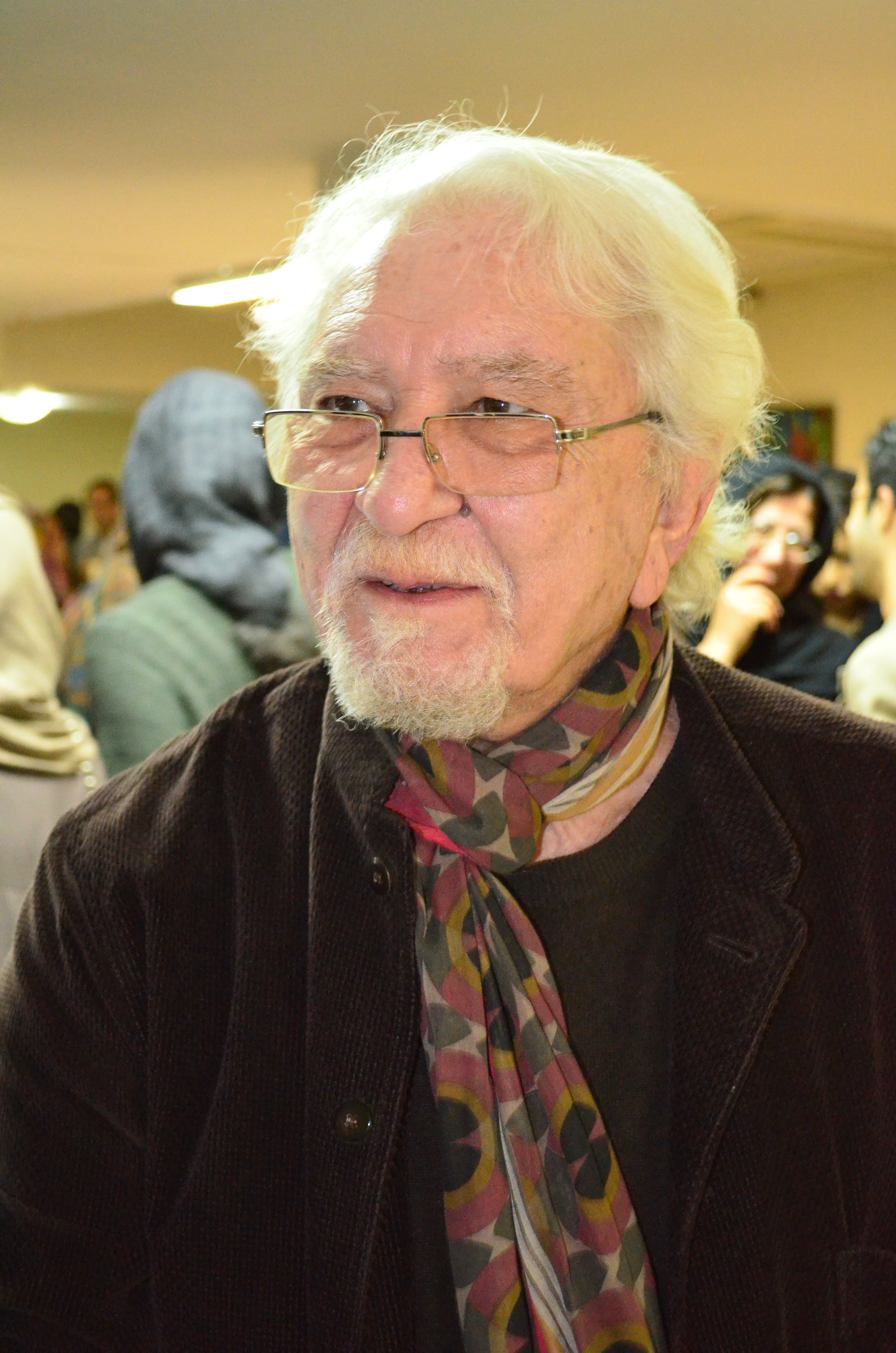
Dariush Shayegan, philosopher and former university professor

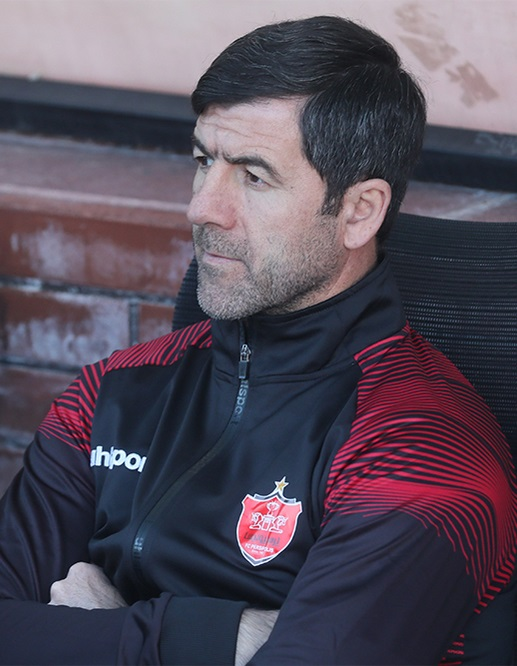
Karim Bagheri, professional football player and coach

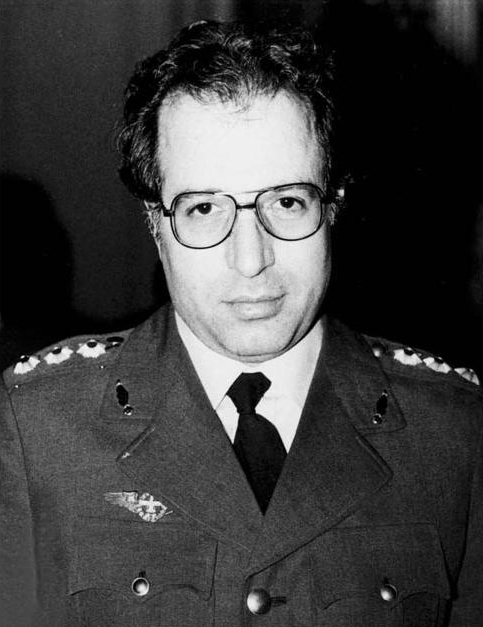
Javad Fakoori, prominent military official and defence minister

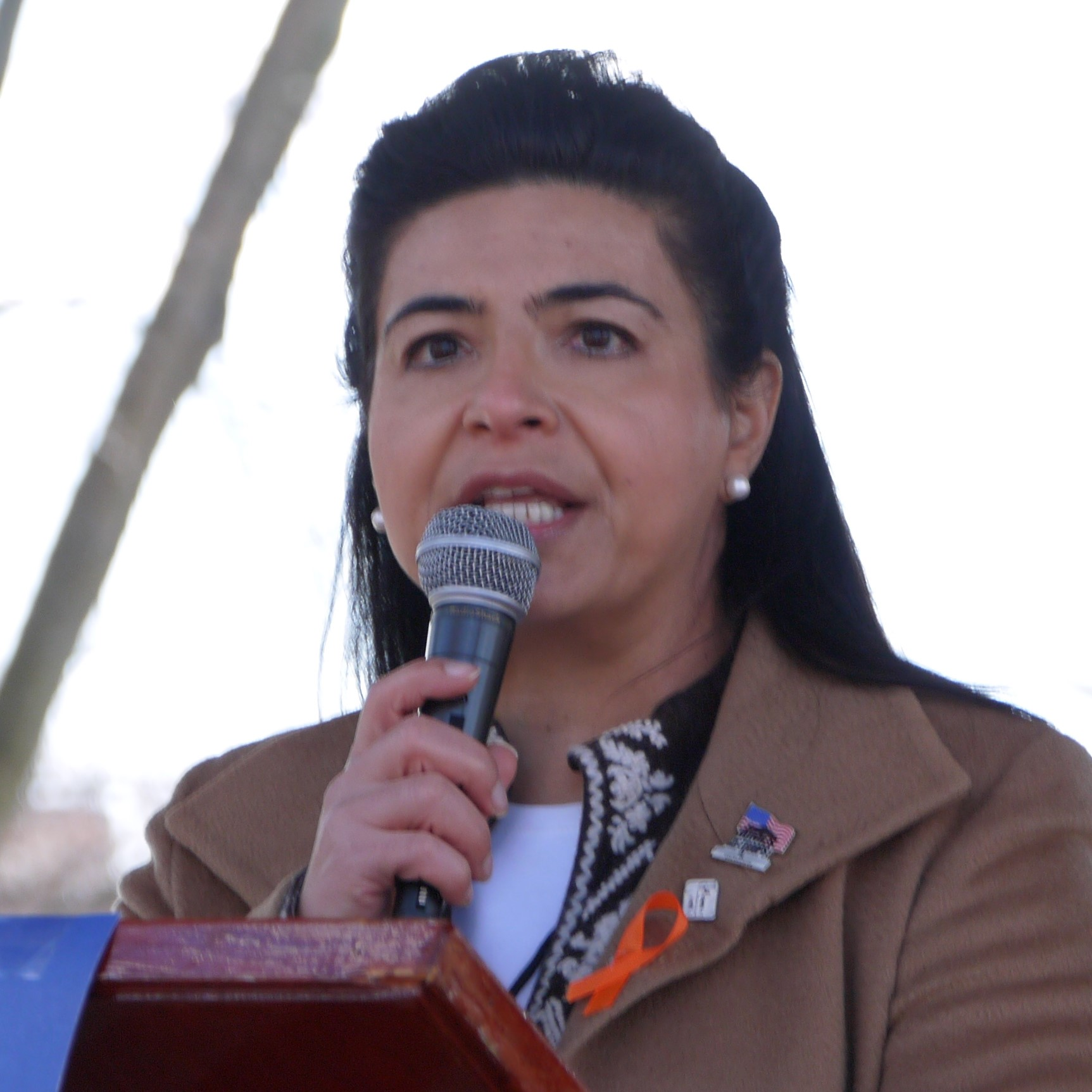
Anna Kaplan (née Monahemi), Iranian-American member of the New York State Senate (2019–22), attorney

== Twin towns – sister cities ==
Tabriz is twinned with:

- Baku, Azerbaijan (1980)
- Erzurum, Turkey (2011)
- Ganja, Azerbaijan (2015)
- Gaza City, Palestine (2013)
- Istanbul, Turkey (2010)
- Karbala, Iraq (2016)
- Kazan, Russia (2004)
- Khujand, Tajikistan (2011)
- Mogilev, Belarus (2012)
- Shanghai, China (2019)

== Consulates ==
Azerbaijan and Turkey have consulate offices in Tabriz. Formerly the Soviet Union and the United States had consulate offices in Tabriz. The US consulate office closed after the 1979 Islamic revolution and the USSR's office closed after the collapse of the USSR in 1991.

== Panoramic view ==
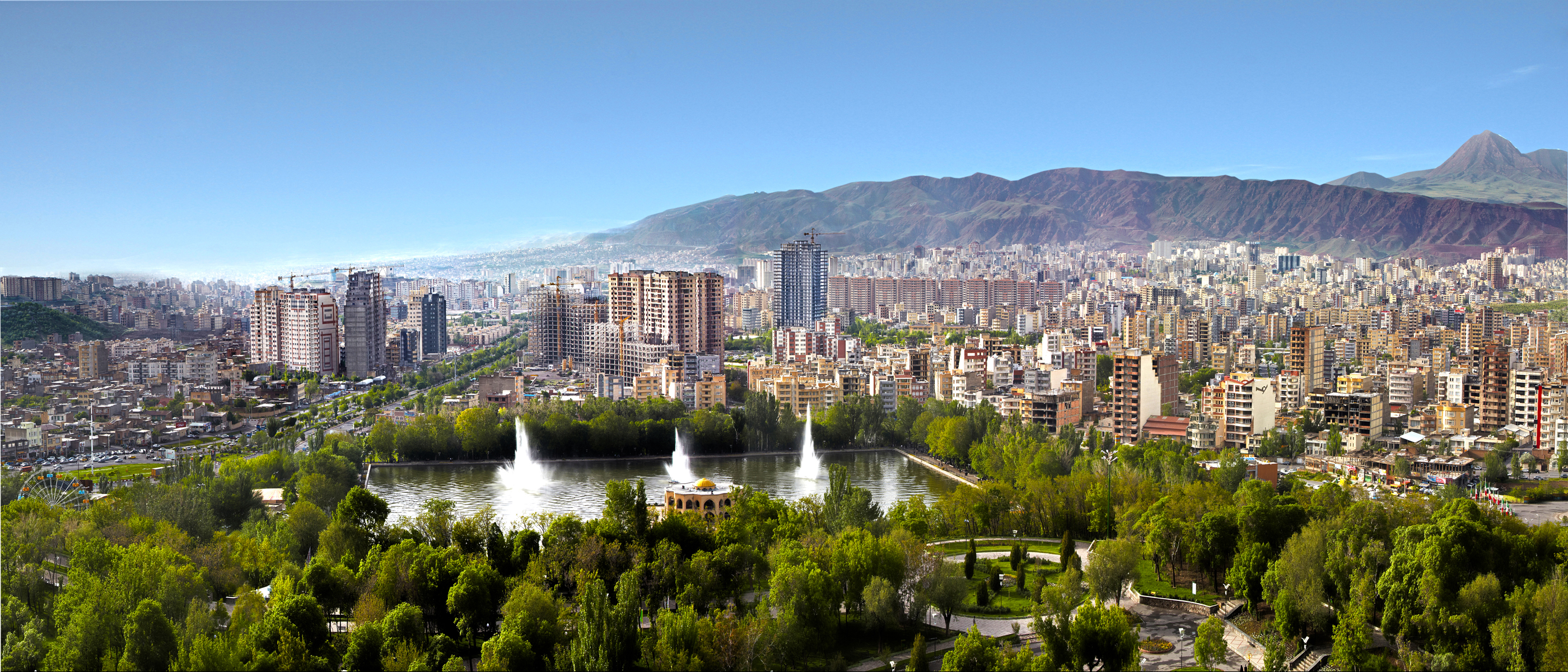
Panoramic view of Tabriz from El Goli, August 2010

== See also ==
- Pardis Animal Shelter
- Tabriz Khanate
- Timeline of Tabriz

Media related to Tabriz at Wikimedia Commons

Tabriz travel guide from Wikivoyage

== Bibliography ==
Preceded by Ghazna	Capital of Khwarazmian Empire (Persia); 1225–1231	Succeeded by -
Preceded by Maragha	Capital of Ilkhanate (Persia); 1265–1306	Succeeded by Soltaniyeh
Preceded by -	Capital of Kara Koyunlu dynasty 1375–1468	Succeeded by -
Preceded by Amid	Capital of Aq Qoyunlu dynasty 1468–1478	Succeeded by -
Preceded by Samarkand	Capital of Safavid Empire (Persia); 1501–1555	Succeeded by Qazvin
