= Visitor attractions of Tabriz =

Iranian places

This is a list of visitor attractions of Tabriz, Iran.

== Bridges (historical) ==
- Aji River bridge, an old bridge on the Aji River, beside the airport street
- Ghari Bridge, historical bridges on the Ghuri River

== Religious buildings ==
=== Churches ===
- Armenian church of Adontist
- Armenian church of Saint Mary
- Assyrian church
- Catholic church of Tabriz

=== Mosques ===
- Blue Mosque of Tabriz ("Göy Masjid")
- Jameh Mosque of Tabriz
- Saheb ol Amr
- Shohada Mosque

== Hammams (Islamic bathhouses) ==
- Nobar bath

== Houses (historical) ==
- Amir Nezam House
- Behnam House (School of Architecture, Tabriz Art University)
- Constitution House of Tabriz
- House of Sheykh ol Islam

== Monuments ==
- Ark-e Tabriz
- Bazaar of Tabriz
- Charm Sazi-e Khosravi (faculty of Applied Arts)
- Ruins of Rabe Rashidi University
- Saat Tower (Tabriz Municipality)
- Tabriz Fire Fighting Tower
- Tabriz Railway Station

== Museums ==
- Azerbaijan Museum
- Museum of Qajar (Amir Nezam House)
- Shahryar Literature Museum (House of Late Poet Shahryar)
- Museum of Ostad Bohtouni in Maqbarat-ol-Shoarapark
- Museum of "Iran municipalities history" in Saat Tower (municipality of Tabriz)

== Parks and gardens ==
- Golestan Park (Golestan garden)
- Shah Gholi park
- Khaqani Park

== Shrines and tombs ==
- Maqbaratoshoara (Tomb of Poets)
- Seyed Hamzeh shrine
- Tomb of Two Kamals

== Streets (historical) ==
- Tarbiyat street
