= Stone Bridge (Tabriz) =

Historic bridge in Tabriz, Iran

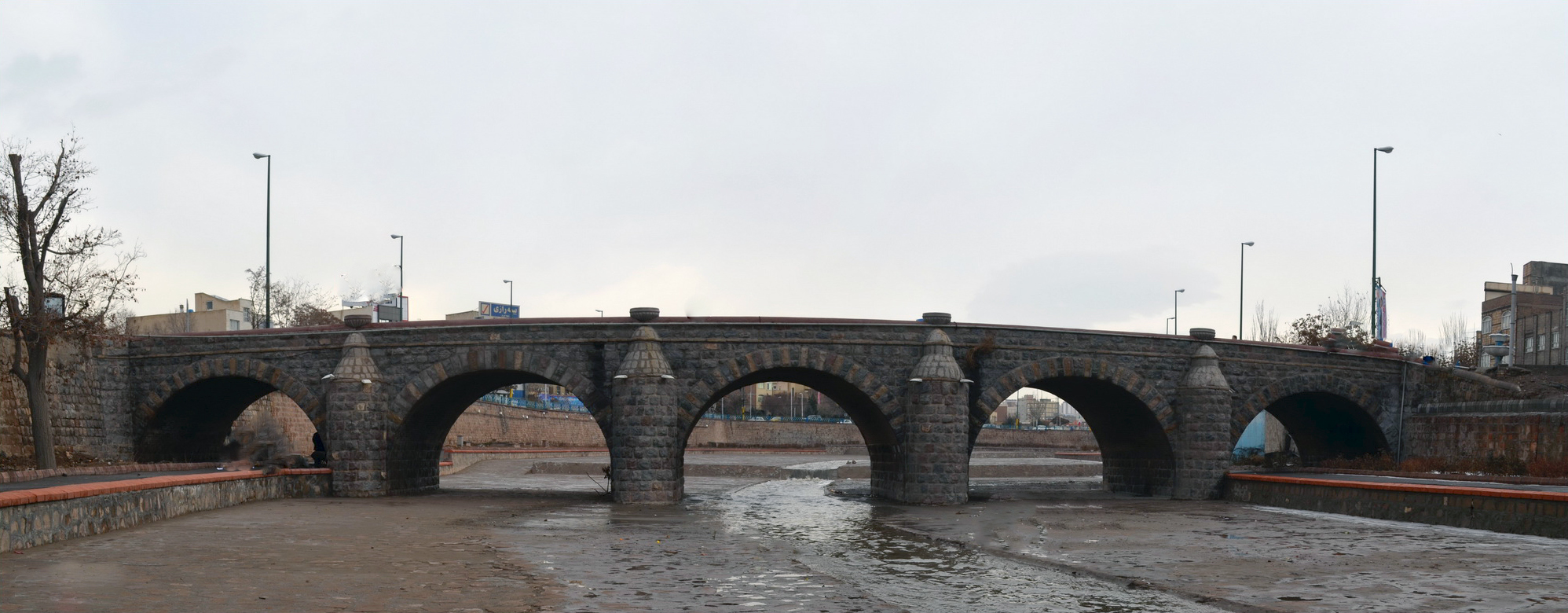
- Interactive map of the Stone Bridge area

General information
- Location: Tabriz, Iran

Stone Bridge (Persian: پل سنگی, romanized: Pol Sangi, Azerbaijani: داش کؤرپوسو, romanized: Dash Korpusu) is a bridge in Tabriz, Iran, over the Quri River. It was built in the Qajar era and is located in Chaykenar, in front of the Pol Sangi (Stone Bridge) Mosque. The bridge was registered as a national monument of Iran on 1 August 2005 with the registration number 12438.
