= Heydar Babaya Salam =

Azerbaijani poetical work by Mohammad Hossein Shahriar

Heydar Babaya Salam (Azerbaijani: حیدربابایه سلام) is an Azerbaijani poetical work by Mohammad Hossein Shahriar, a famous Iranian Azerbaijani poet. Published in 1954 in Tabriz, it is about Shahriar's childhood and his memories of his village Khoshgenab near Tabriz. Heydar Baba is the name of a mountain overlooking the village.

It is considered to be a pinnacle of Azerbaijani literature and gained popularity in the Turkic-speaking world. It was translated into more than 30 languages.

In Heydar Babaya Salam Shahriar narrates a nostalgia from his childhood in a village in Iranian Azerbaijan.

In describing Heydar Baba, Shahryar uses the Azeri word regime toward Iranian Azerbaijanis. Here, in every part of Azerbaijan, a Heydar Baba rises up and becomes a gigantic wall that supports and protects Azerbaijan against its foes.
