= Sheshgelan =

District of Tabriz, Iran

Coordinates: 38°04′56.8″N 46°18′29.6″E

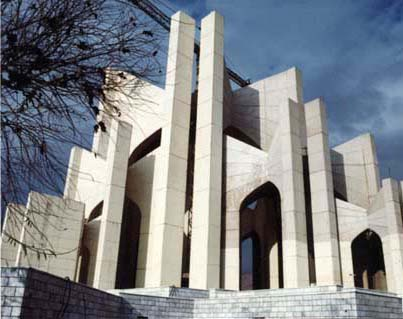
Tomb of poets

Sheshghelan (Persian: ششگلان, Azerbaijani: Şeşgilan, also Sheshgelan) is one of the districts of Tabriz. Located at the city center, it is one of the oldest quarters of the city and contains several historical buildings, including Qari Bridge, Amir Nezam House, Seyed Hamzeh shrine. Museum of Ostad Bohtouni and Maqbaratoshoara are other points of interest in Sheshgelan.

Sheshgelan, along with Bagmesha, Sirkhab and Davachi, were among the districts of Tabriz that were against the constitutional revolution of Iran.
