= Chaykenar Highway =

Road in Tabriz, Iran

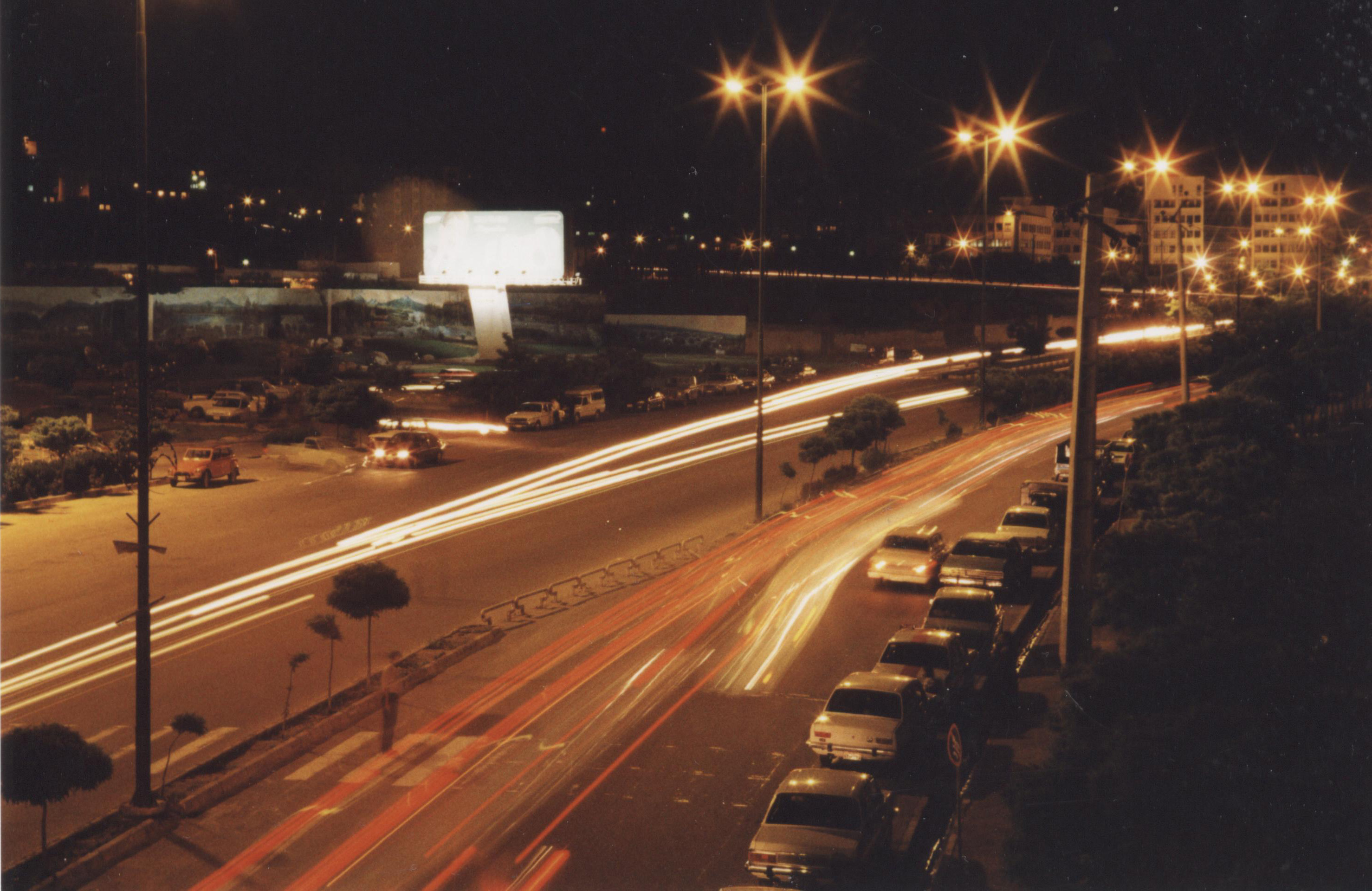
Chaykenar at night.

Chaykenar Highway are two highways North and South of the Quri River in Tabriz. The overall length of the Chaykenar Highways is about 10 km, which connects far eastern and western districts of Tabriz. Part of the Chaykenar Highways, near to its eastern end, has parkways along the highway. Except its junction at Qari Bridge, two older bridges over Quir river, the rest of the junctions of the Chaykenar are Grade separation junctions. In part of its root, Chaykenar includes the longest underpass in Iran with a length of 2 km.
