= Mahmoud Melmasi – Azarm =

Iranian poet and scholar

Mahmoud Melmasi (Persian: محمود ملماسی) was an Iranian poet and scholar. He was a descendant of Homam-e Tabrizi. He was born on 1917 in Tabriz.

He learned reading and writing before he was five years old from his father and then from Mirza Mohsen Adib Ulama. After some months, he went to school. He finished Gulistan of Sa'di at nine years old and Kalyleh and Demne at thirteen years old. These parts of learning caused his interest in Persian literature.

He married the daughter of Sayed Ibrahim Darvazeie and had six children, five boys (Aladdin, Roknaddin, Zya’aldyn, Fereydoun and Farrokh) and one daughter.

One of the prominent scholars of the late M. illuminati was from this village, in his weighty book (learning partners) on Page 368 and 369 in family and children, Mlmasy family descendant, the late Mr. Aladdin Mlmasy said: the descendants of the late Azam TabriziGod protect Bdarad tongue injury.

== Death ==
He died on 23 June 1991 and was buried in the Maqbaratoshoara.
