= Gajil =

Ancient and historical district of Tabriz

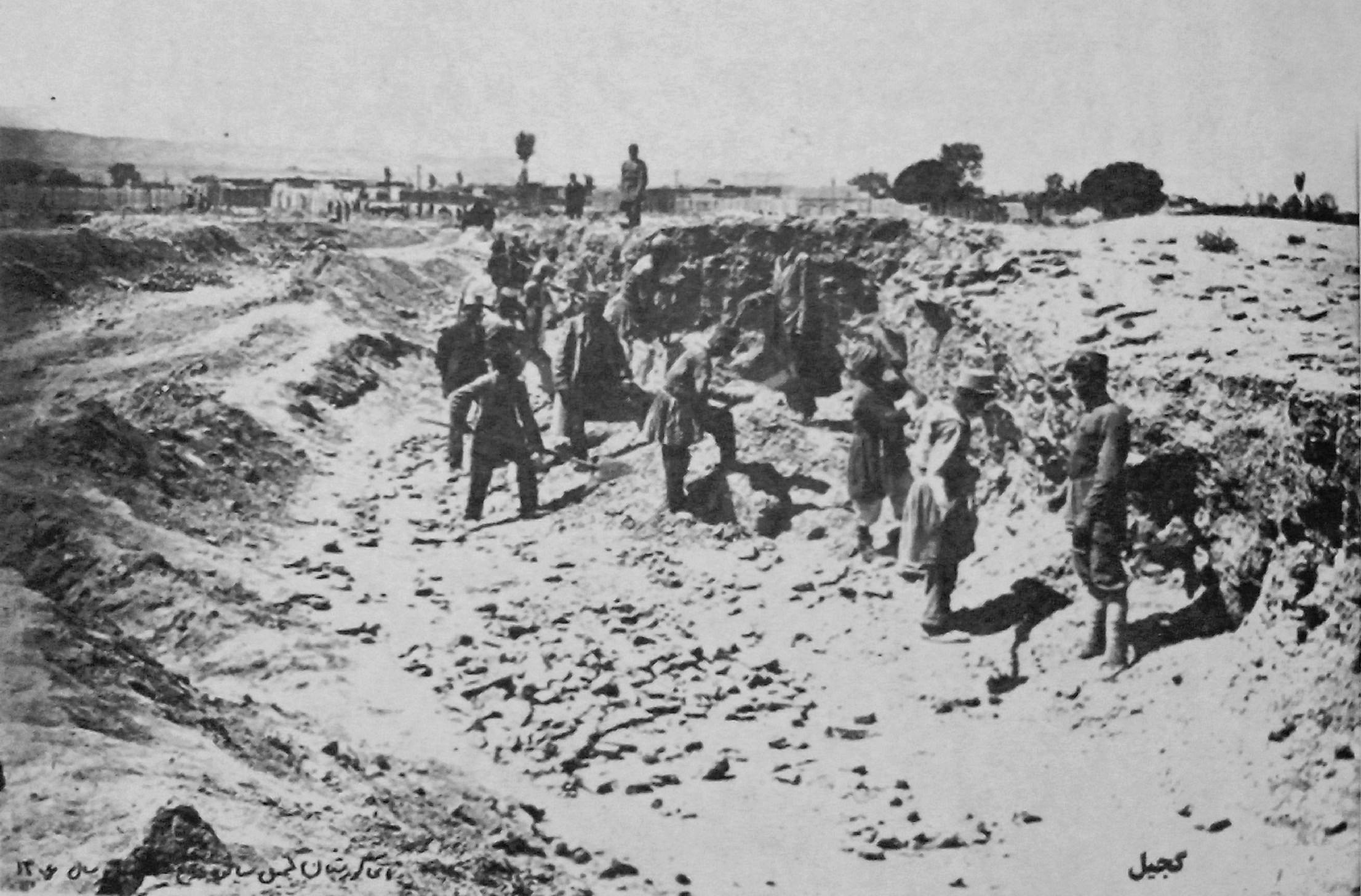
Gajil Gate

Gajil is an ancient and historical district in Tabriz. The district is mainly famous for having one of the major gates of the older Tabriz in ancient times. In Pahlavi period, Golestan Park, is constructed in part of the Gajil district, which was previously used as a cemetery.

== Sources ==
- Gajil

== See also ==
- Golestan Park
