= Imamzadeh Hamzah, Tabriz =

Iranian shrine and mosque

Imāmzādeh Hamzah, Tabriz
- امامزاده سید حمزه (تبریز)
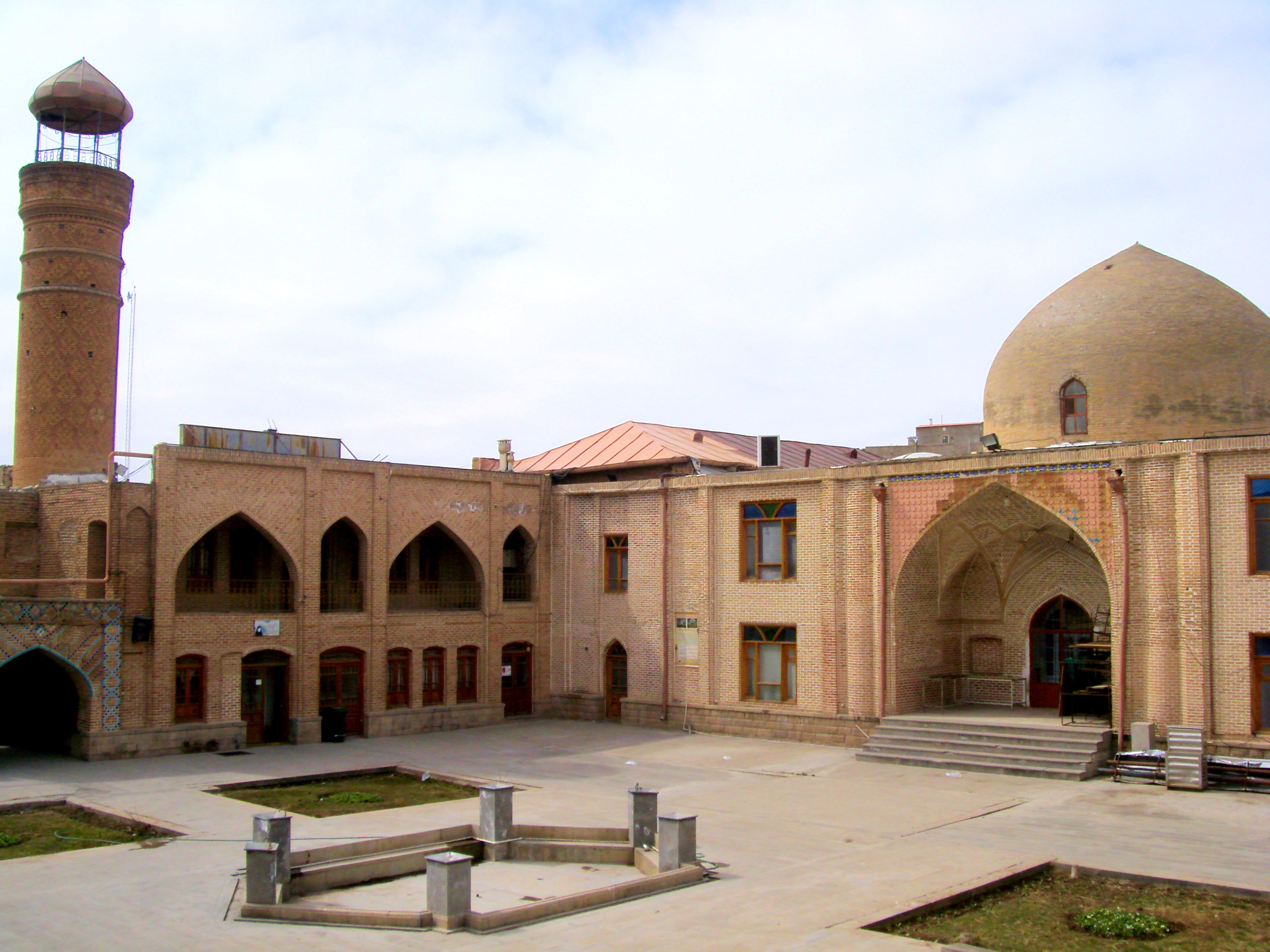
- Resting place of Hamzah, a son of Musa al-Kazim

- Location of the funerary complex in Iran

Religion
- Affiliation: Shia Islam
- Ecclesiastical or organisational status: Imamzadeh, mausoleum, and mosque
- Status: Active

Location
- Location: Sheshghelan, Tabrīz, East Azerbaijan
- Country: Iran
- Interactive map of Imāmzādeh Hamzah, Tabriz
- Coordinates: 38°05′01″N 46°18′10″E

Architecture
- Type: Mosque architecture
- Style: Safavid; Qajar
- Completed: 14th century CE

Specifications
- Dome: One
- Minaret: One
- Shrine: One (Mūsā al-Kāzim)

The Imamzadeh Hamzah (Persian: امامزاده سید حمزه (تبریز), romanized: Imāmzādah Sayyid Hamzah; Arabic: مرقد حمزة الكاظم (تبريز)) is a Twelver Shia imamzadeh, mausoleum, and mosque complex in Tabrīz, in the province of East Azerbaijan, Iran. The complex contains the grave of Hamzah, son of the Twelver Imam, Musa al-Kazim. The Imāmzādeh Hamzah is located in the Sheshghelan suburb of Tabrīz, next to Maqbaratoshoara and the Museum of Ostad Bohtouni.

== History ==
Sayyid Abi al-Qasim Hamzah was a son of Imam Musa ibn Ja'far al-Kazim, who was credited for the genealogy of the Safavid dynasty. Hence, Imāmzādeh Hamzah is a "de facto ancestral cemetery". Thus, it strengthens the notability of its link to the mosque in Ardabil where the elite Safavids have been buried. The style of decoration of the Hamzah Mosque is further enhanced and has therefore enjoyed sustained patronage.

The exquisite mausoleum dates from the 14th century (8th century AH), with influence from the Safavid and Qajar eras and is thus a pilgrimage centre.

== Gallery ==
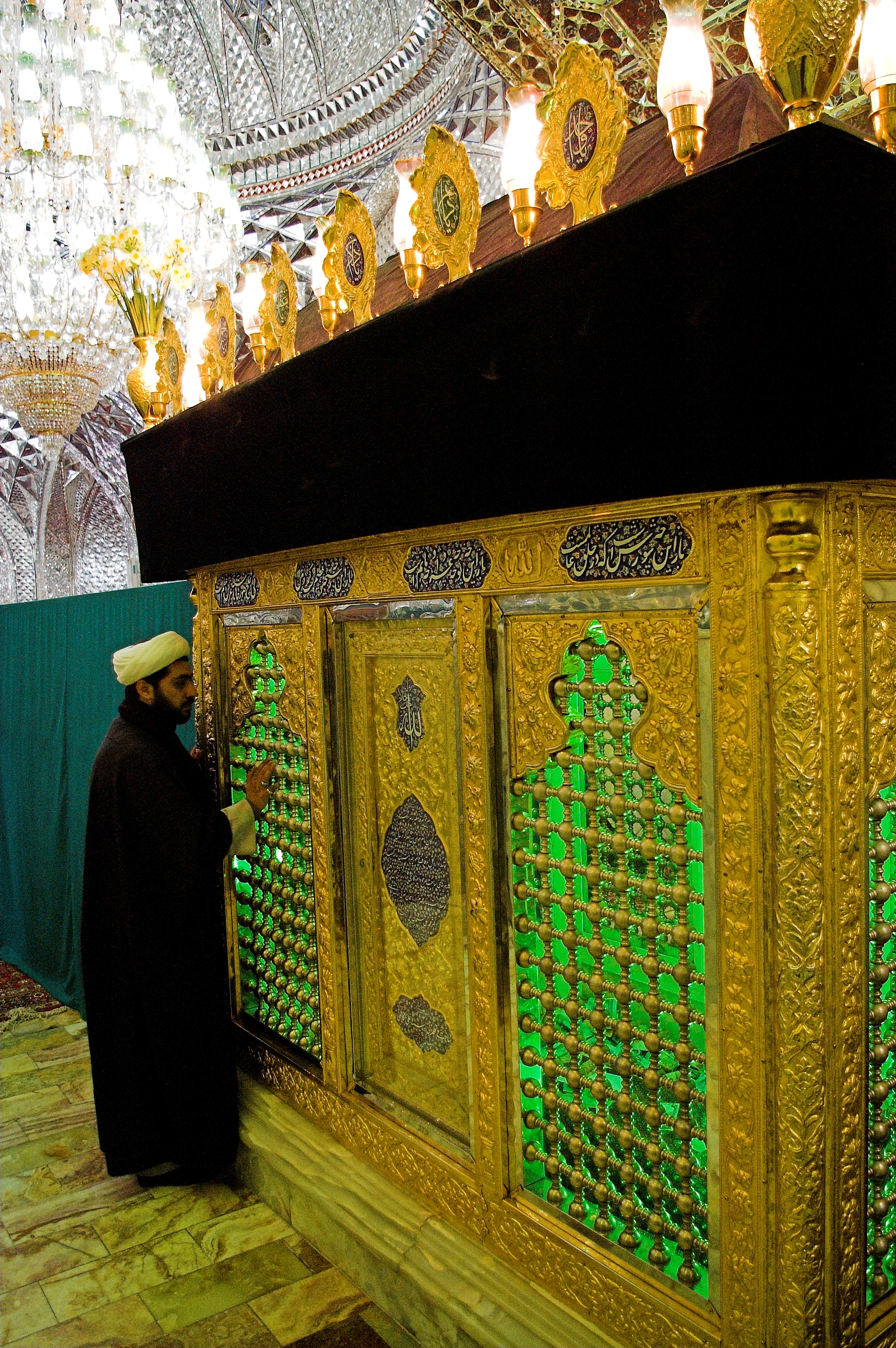
The grave of Hamzah (son of Mūsā al-Kāzim) with mirror work in the mosque

== See also ==
- Shia Islam in Iran
- List of mosques in Iran
- List of imamzadehs in Iran
