= El-Gölü =

Historic park in Tabriz, Iran

Coordinates: 38°01′31.16″N 46°21′56.15″E

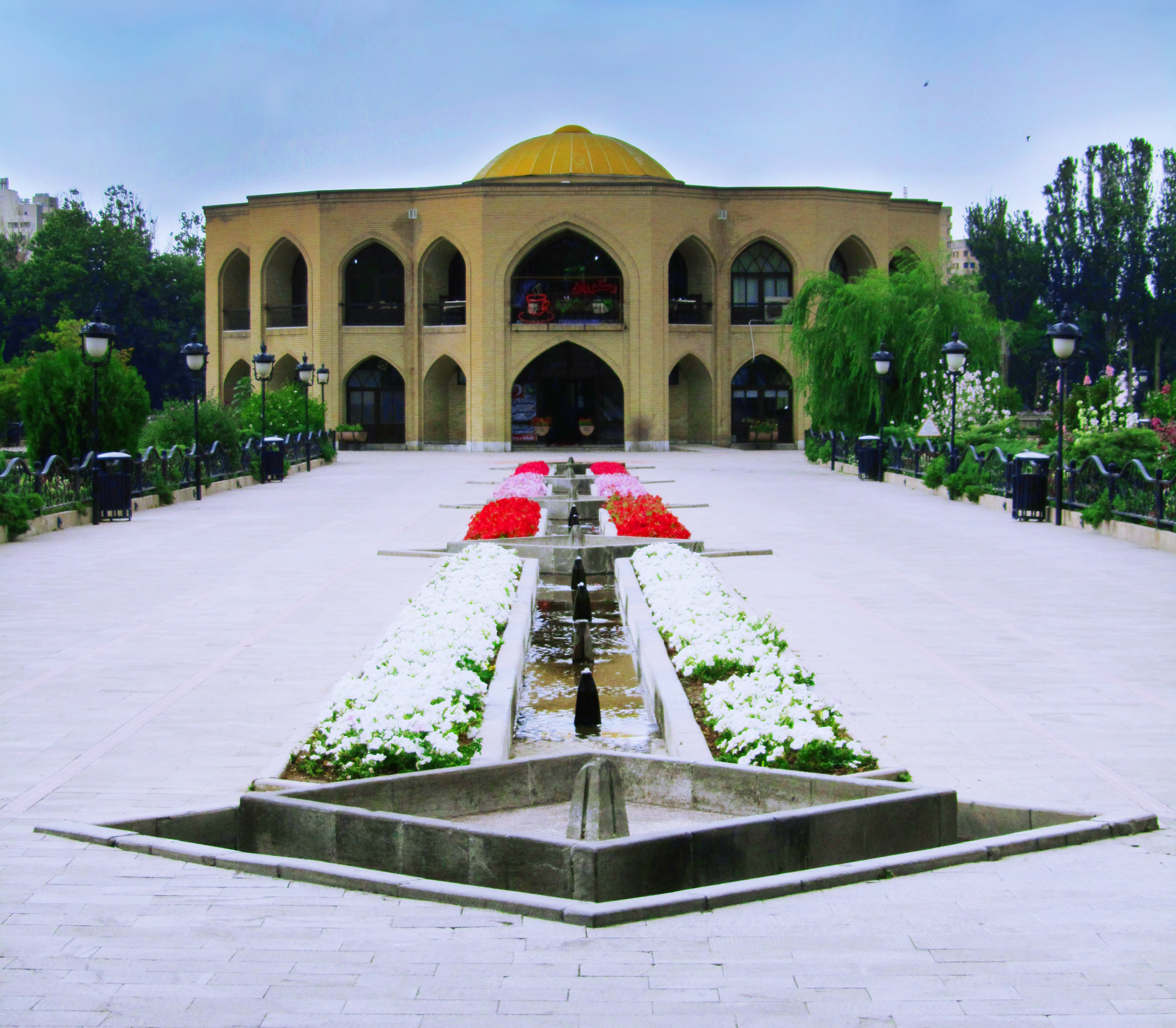

El Goli (Persian: ائل‌گلی; Azerbaijani: ائل گؤلی, romanized: El-Gölü), also called Shah Goli (Persian: شاه‌گلی; Azerbaijani: شاه گؤلی, romanized: Şah Gölü, Şah-Gölü) is a large historic park (or garden) in the south east region of Tabriz, Iran. One of its main features is its large artificial lake, measuring approximately 55,000 m^{2} (590,000 sq ft).

== History and characteristics ==
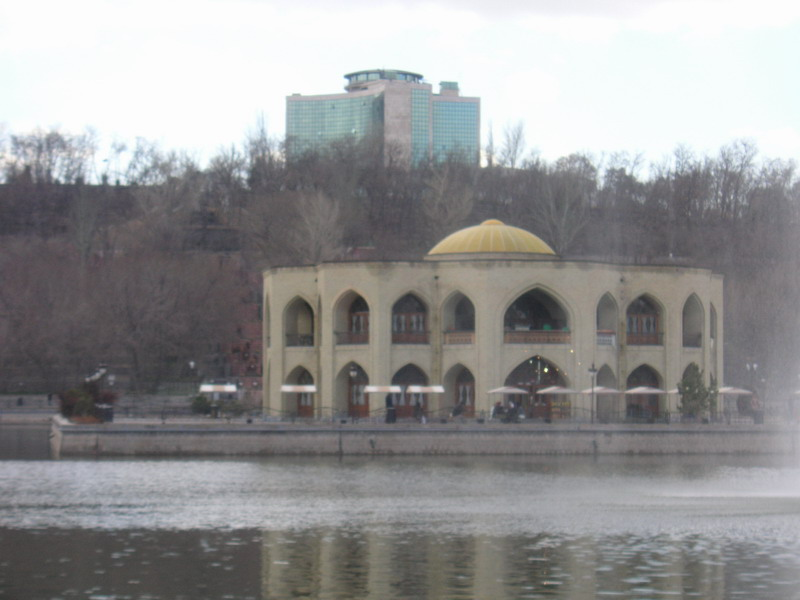
Pars El-Goli Hotel back of the El-Goli

Tradition dates the construction of the park to the late 18th century. However, it may have been built earlier with some sources suggesting a date in as far back as the 14th century. In the Qajar era, the park was restored and high terraces were added.

The northern side of the lake was built up, which, according to Penelope Hobhouse, makes the lake "appear to float over the valley". A causeway leads out to a pavilion, today the site of a restaurant. The pavilion was once crowned with a dome. From the west hillside, a spring feeds the lake, a cascade descending in five terraces. The sight is flanked by poplar trees and willows.

== Etymology ==
The park was first named Shah Goli, the "Royal Lake" or the "Royal Pond". After the Iranian Revolution of 1979, the park and its surrounding area were renamed El Goli, "lake of the people".

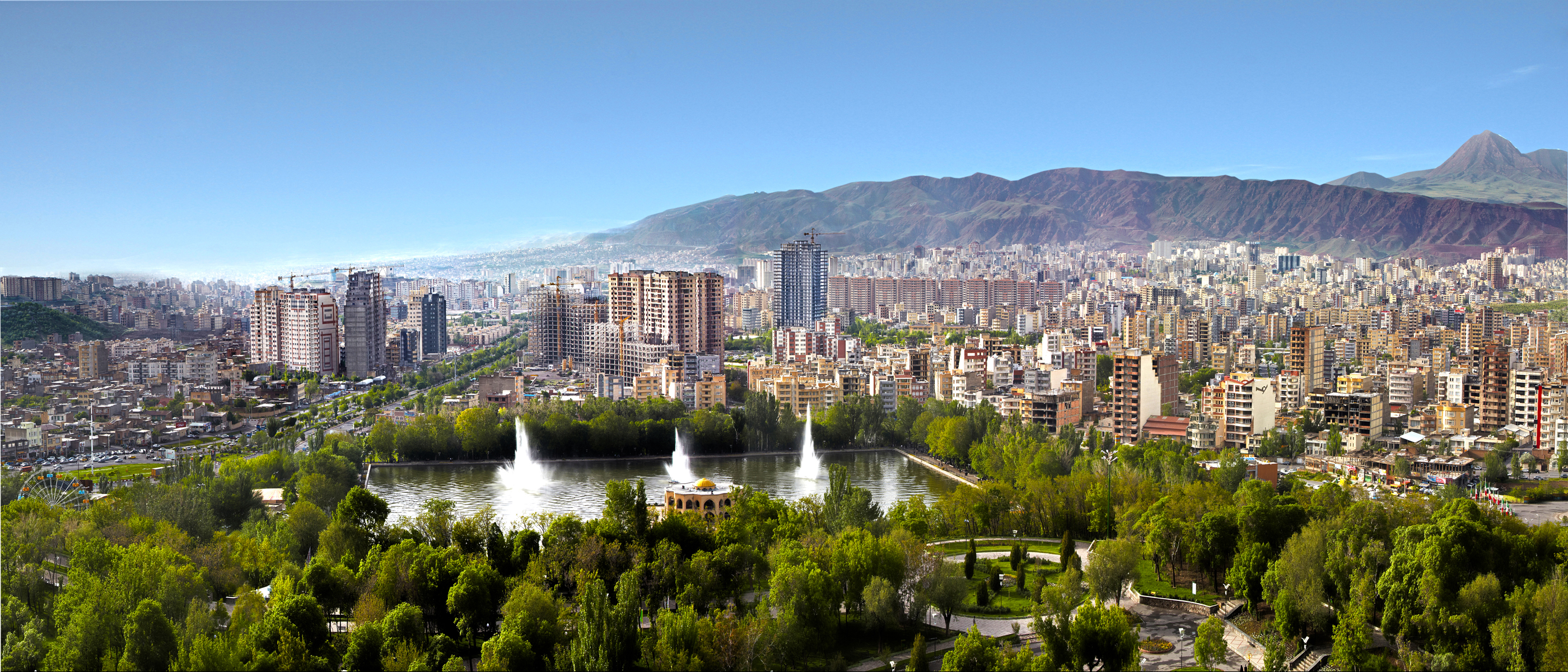
Panoramic view of Tabriz from El Goli.
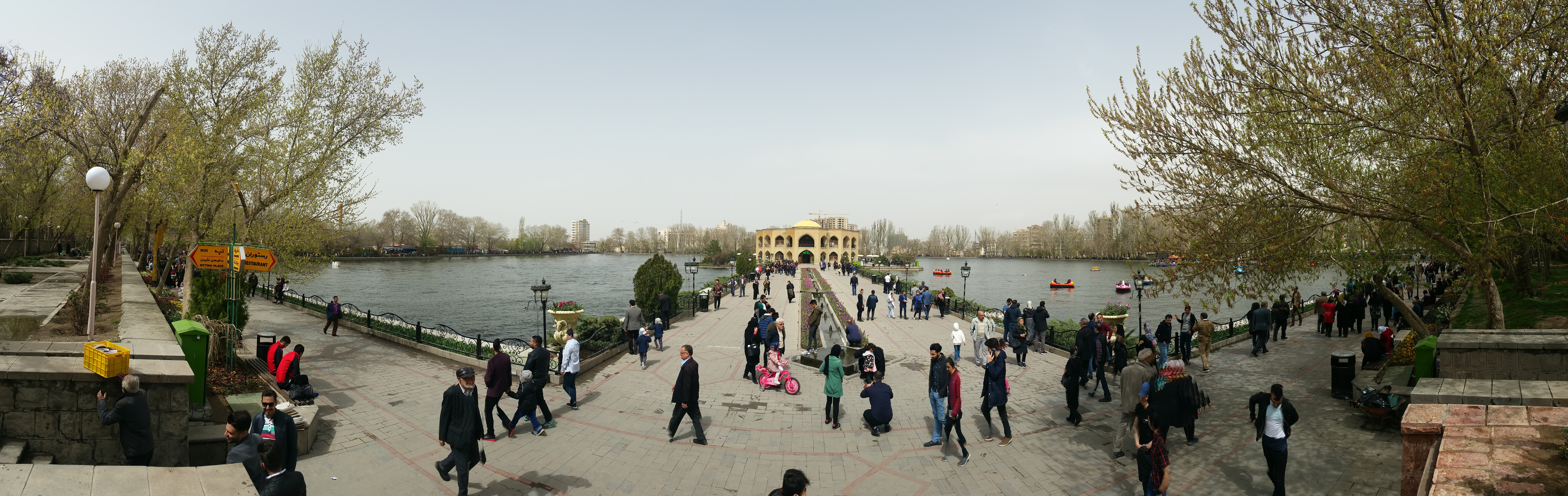
Panoramic view of El Goli.

== Photo gallery ==
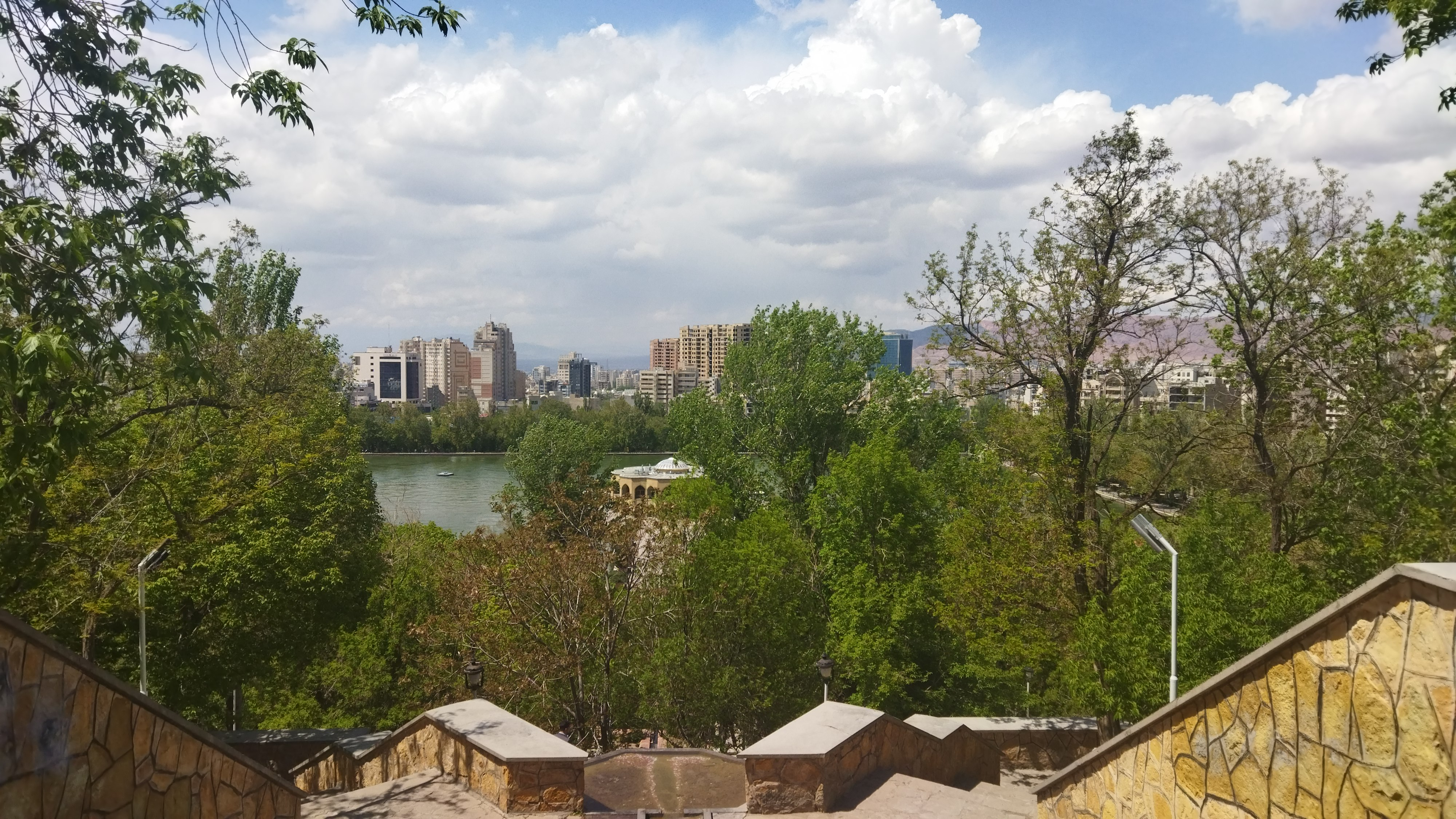
El Goli

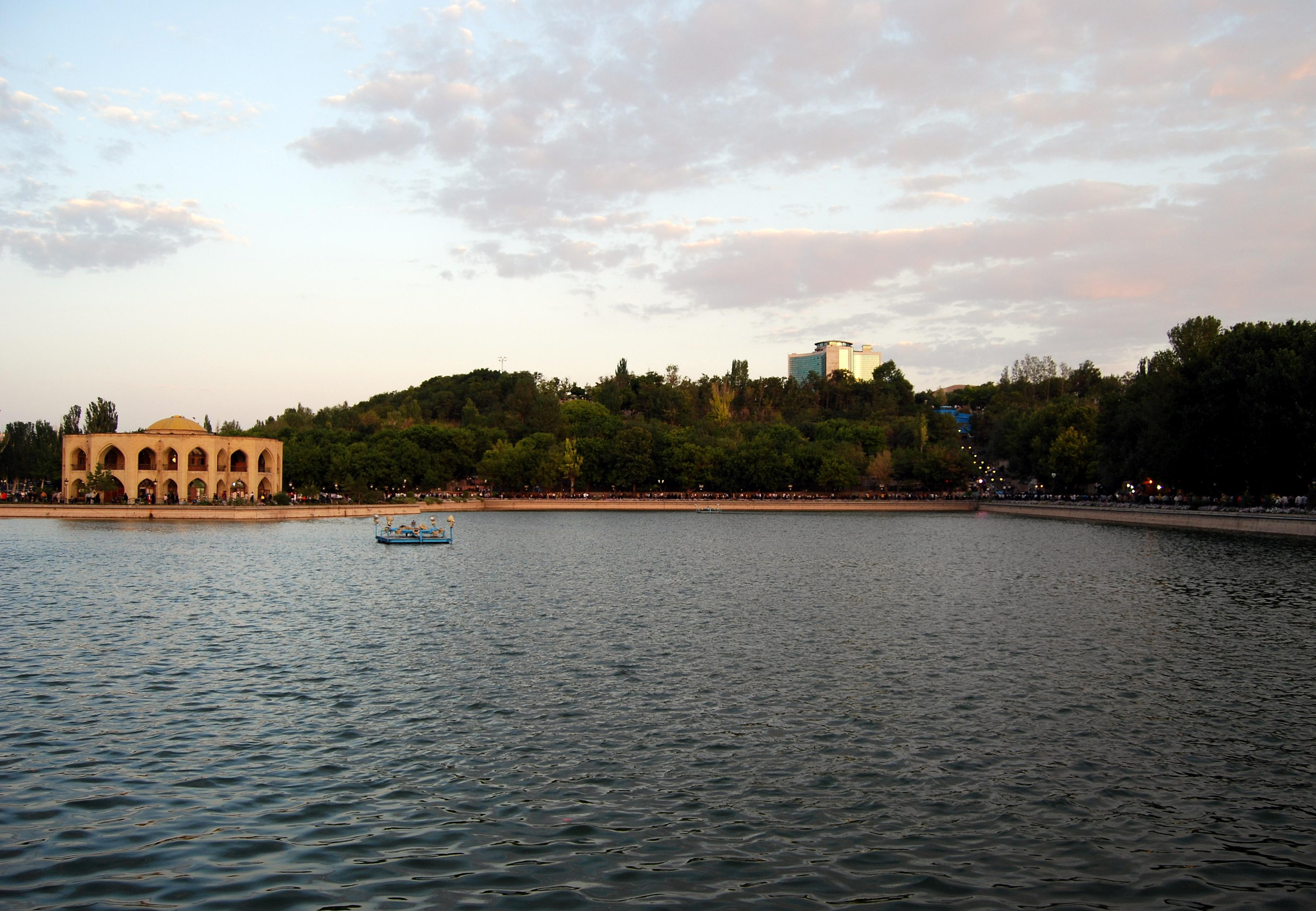
El Goli lake and Hotel Pars in top of the hills.

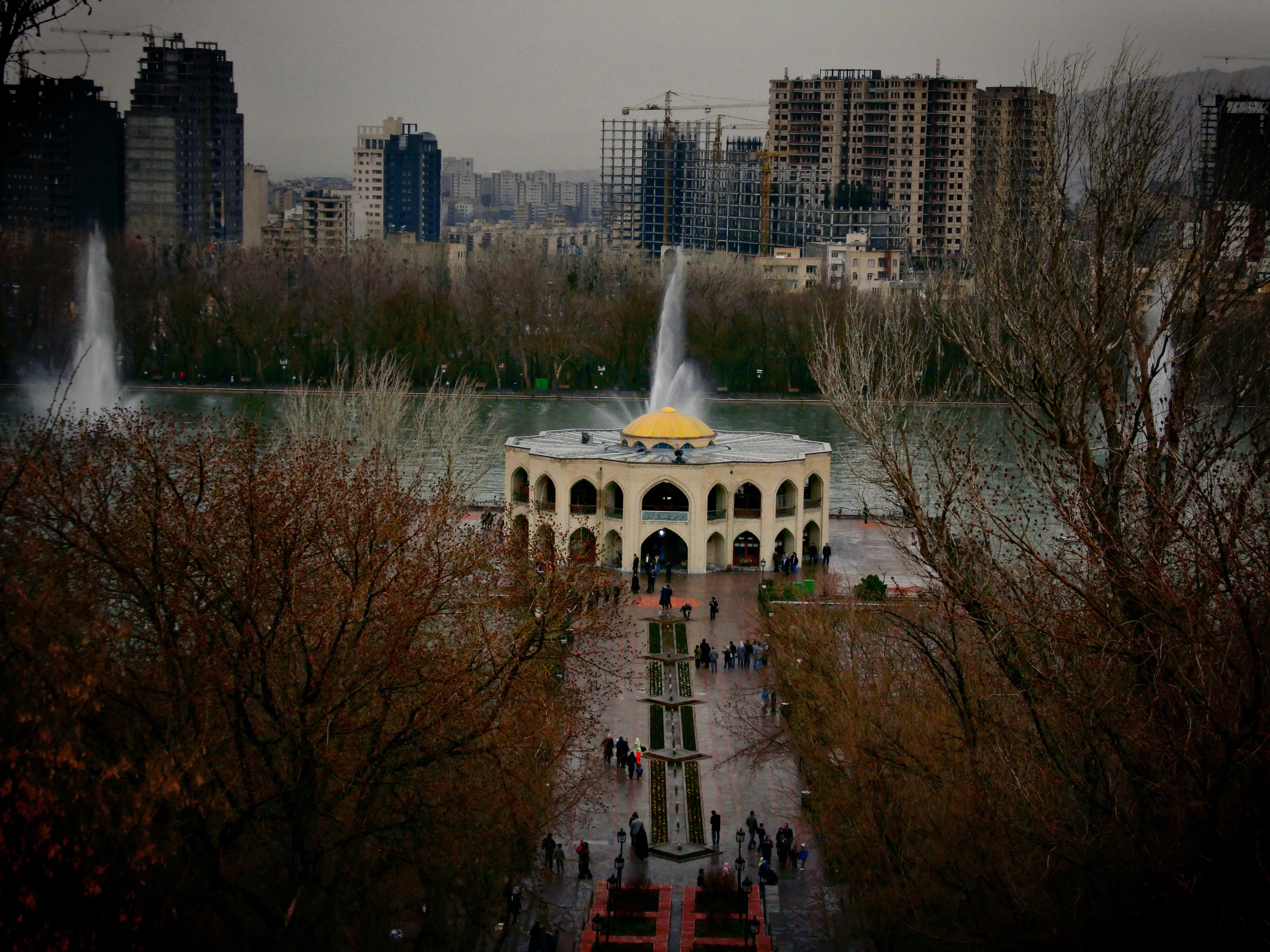
El Goli lake from hills.

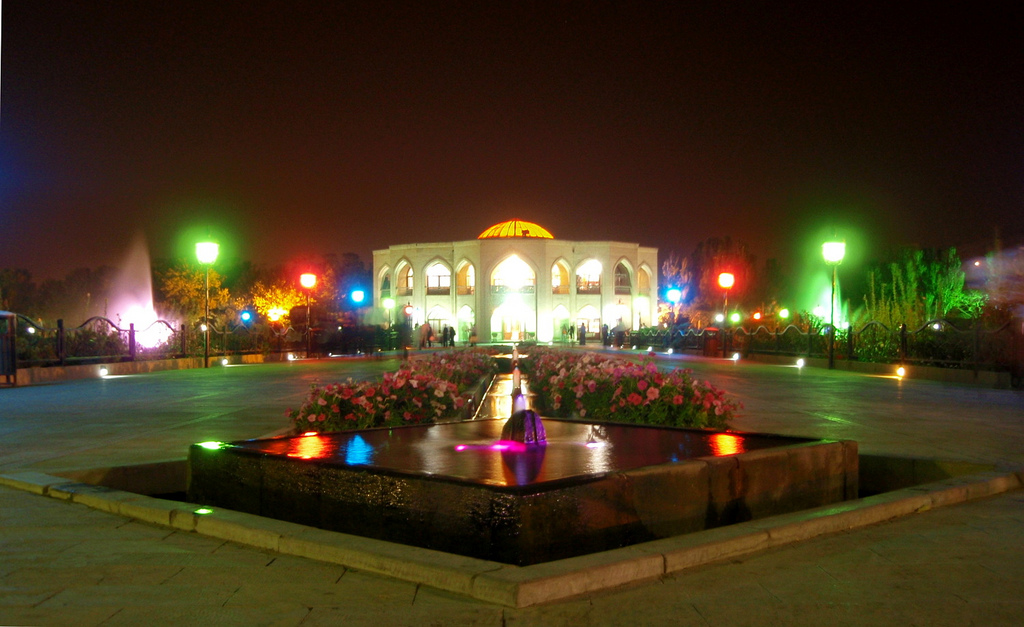
Night view of El Goli.

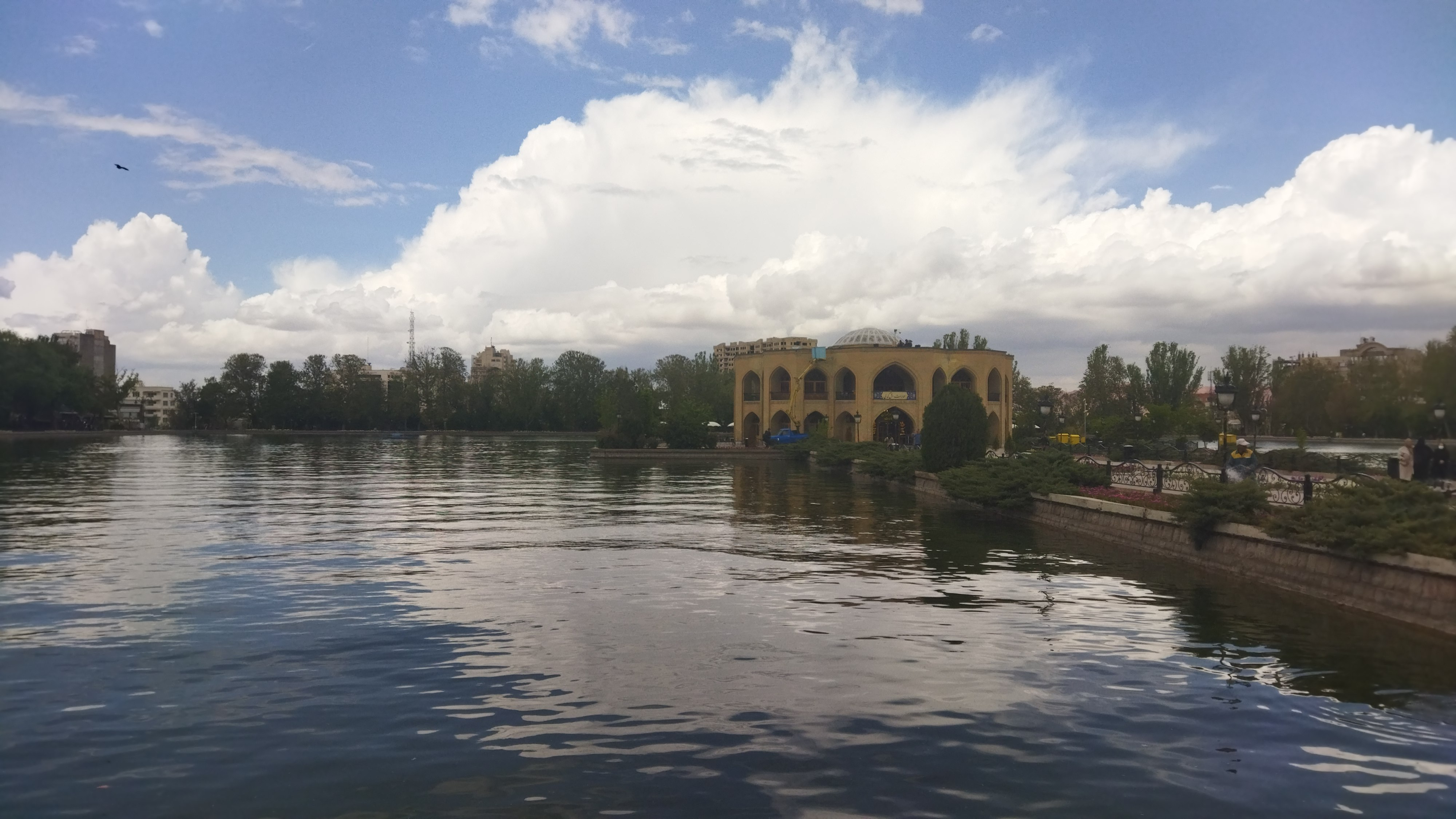
El Goli

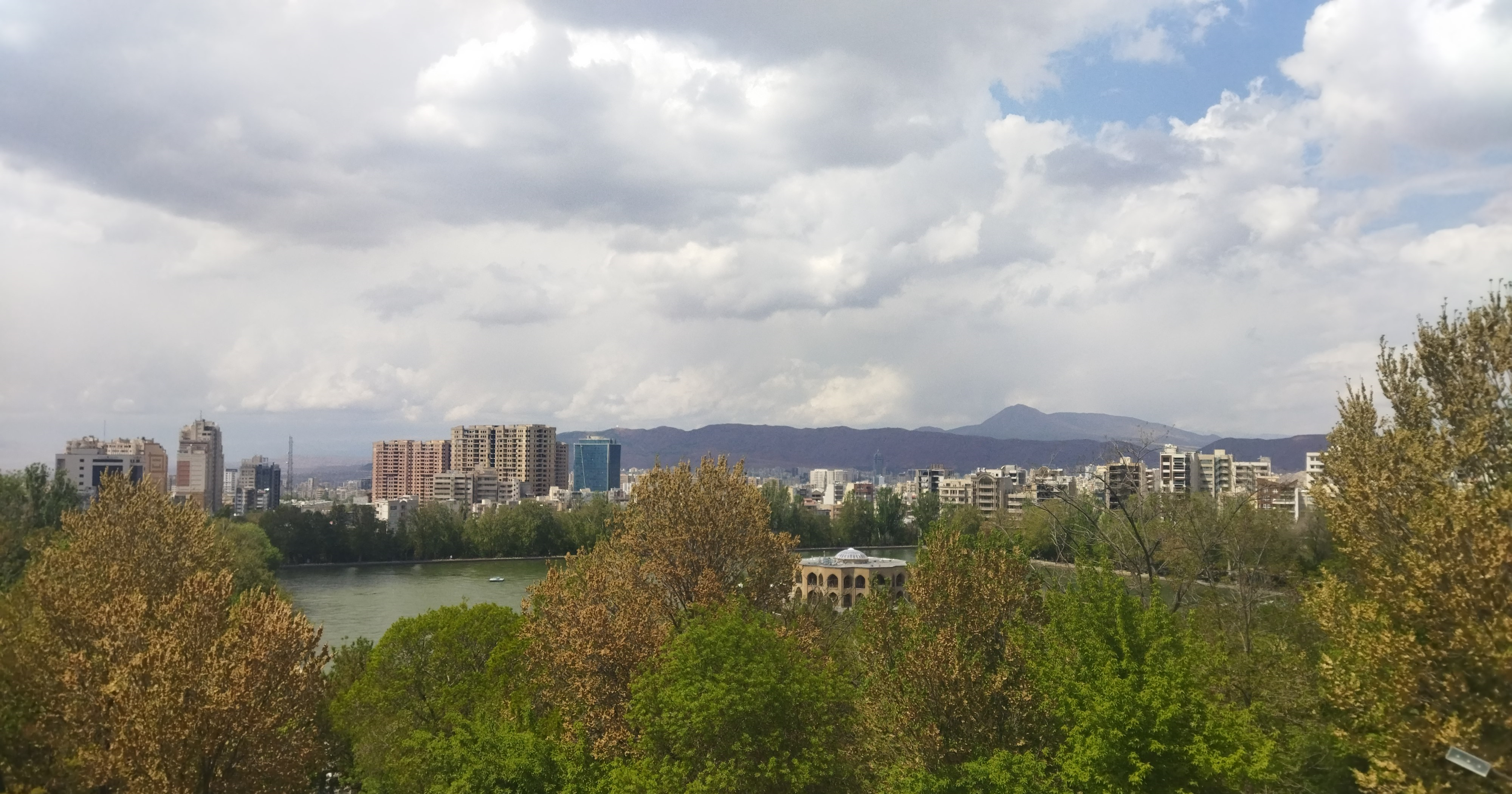
El Goli

== See also ==
- Khaqani Park
- Golestan Park

== Sources ==
- Hobhouse, Penelope (2006). "Shah-Goli". The Oxford Companion to the Garden. Oxford University Press. ISBN 978-0-19-866255-6.
