= Zu'l-Fiqar Shirvani =

Persian poet of the Ilkhanid-era

Zu'l Fiqar Shirvani (Note: Also transliterated as "Zo'l Faqar Shirvani", "D(h)u'l Faqar Shirvani", "Zo'l Feqar Shirvani", "Zol Feqar-e Shirvani".) (died c. 1291) was a Persian poet of the Ilkhanid-era. His divan consists of 9,000 verses. Mohammad Dabirsiaqi / Encyclopædia Iranica notes that "he was generally recognized as a master of versification".

== Biography ==
Zu'l-Fiqar born to a certain Sadr al-Din Ali. He was patronized by Atabeg Yusofshah I of the Fazluya branch of the Atabegs of Lorestan. Zu'l-Fiqar dedicated several panegyric odes to Yusofshah, and also wrote similar poems for Ilkhanid ruler Gaykhatu, the Qara-Khitai amir Jalal al-Din Soyurgatmesh (who ruled in Kerman), and Padishah Khatun (who succeeded Soyurgatmesh in Kerman).

Zu'l-Fiqar Shirvani's tomb is located in Maqbaratoshoara, in Tabriz, northwestern Iran.

== Works ==
According to Mohammad Dabirsiaqi / Encyclopædia Iranica, Zu'l-Fiqar Shirvani's poems have a "charming, lyrical quality". Among his "more important works", one finds the Mafatih ol-kalam va madayeh ol-keram, dedicated to Khvajeh Mohammad Mastari (a vizier of the Ilkhanid period). In this lengthy panegyric work, Zu'l-Fiqar uses "two opening verses (matla) encompassing every possible combination of meter (da'era) and elision (zehafat), written in acrostic form (tawsih)". Dabirsiaqi states that the work is also noted for the fact that in every few lines within the same section (the two opening verses), certain words can be strung together to form new distichs (abyat) with different meters.

== Sources ==
- Dabirsiaqi, Mohammad (1996). "ḎU'L-FAQĀR ŠĪRVĀNĪ". Encyclopaedia Iranica, Vol. VII, Fasc. 6. p. 569.
