= Mehraneh river =

River in Tabriz, Iran

Mehraneh roud

Location
- Country: Iran
- State: East Azerbaijan
- City: Tabriz

Physical characteristics
- Source
  - location: East Azerbaijan, Iran
- Length: 25 km (16 mi)

Mehraneh roud is a river in Tabriz, crossing through the middle of Tabriz. It starts in the Sahand mountains.

== Sources ==
- مهرانه رود

== See also ==
- Aji Chay
