= Aziz Dowlatabadi =

Iranian poet and library director (1922–2009)

Aziz Dowlatabadi (Persian: عزیز دولت‌آبادی; 1922 in Tabriz – 30 April 2009, in Tabriz), also known by the pen name Darvish, was an Iranian poet. He was the first director of the Tabriz National Library and Tarbiat Library. He died of lung cancer on 30 April 2009 and was buried in the Mausoleum of Poets.
