= Aji Chay Bridge =

Bridge in Tabriz, Iran

Coordinates: 38°07′02.04″N 46°15′52.6″E

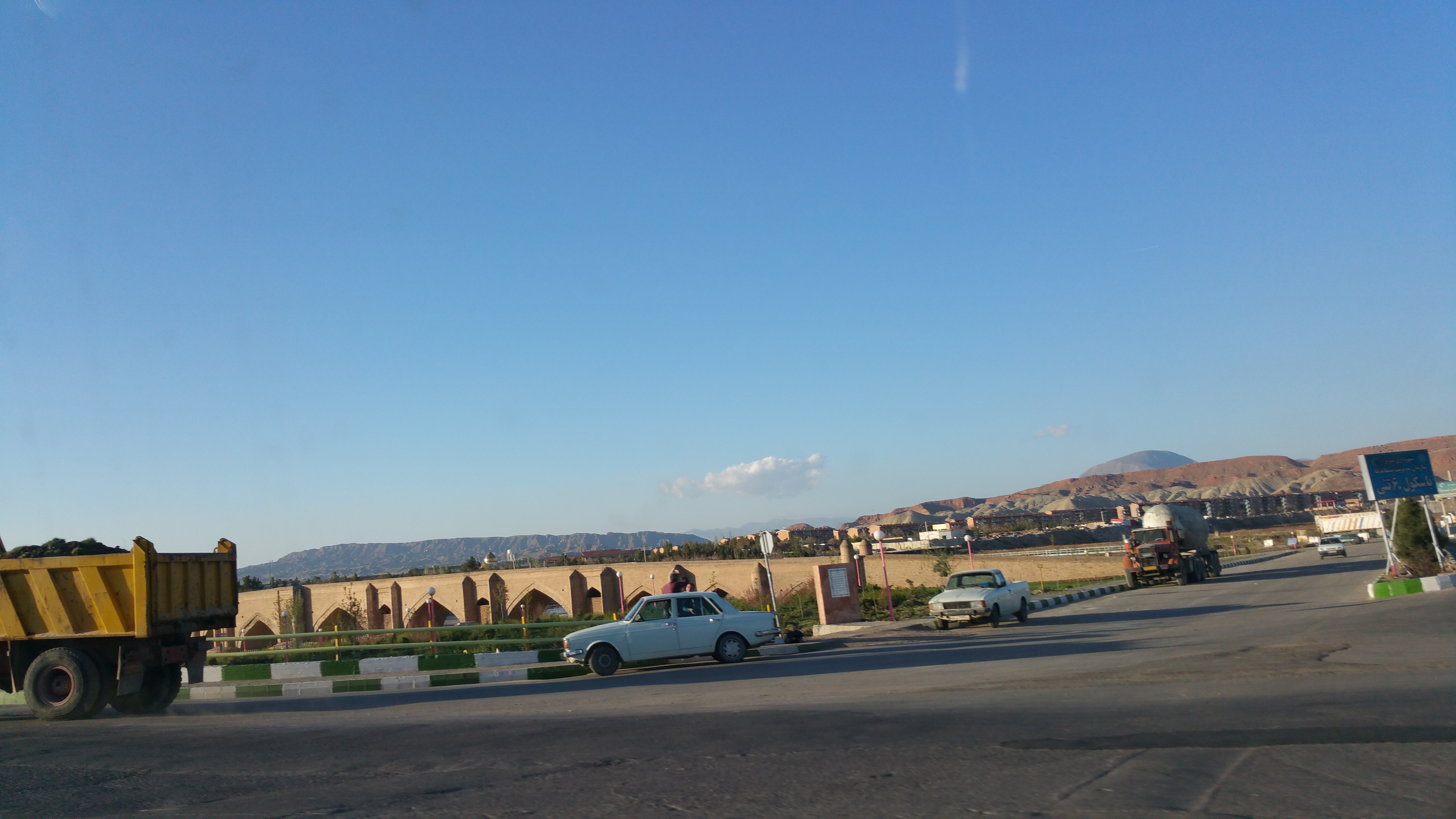
The older Aji Chay bridge in north west of Tabriz

Aji Chy Bridge is a historic bridge in northwest of Tabriz on the Aji Chay river. This bridge connected Tabriz to the northwestern parts of Iranian Azerbaijan and was a major element on the route connecting the rest of the country to Turkey and Russia. As such, it was a major element in connecting the eastern and western parts of the Silk Road. The bridge has been restored and damaged numerous times during the course of history either by natural disasters or during the wars happened in the region. The latest major reconstruction of the bridge was performed in the 19th century during Abbas Mirza's governorship by architect Hadj-Seyed-Hossein Tajer. The bridge includes 16 spans with an overall length of 105 meters and width of 5 meters. Due to several times of restoration and reconstruction the bridge doesn't have a uniform architecture. Three spans out of 16 are semi-circular shape while rest of the spans are in zig zag shape. Recently the restoration of the bridge was performed by Iranian Organization of Cultural Heritages and registered in Iranian national heritages with number 2516.

In second half of the last century a new bridge has been built next to the ancient bridge and traffic transferred to the new bridge. The old bridge is open only for pedestrian visitors.
