= Tabriz Islamic Arts University =

Public university in Tabriz, East Azarbaijan, Iran

Coordinates: 38°04′16.23″N 46°17′39.78″E

Tabriz Islamic Art University
- دانشگاه هنر اسلامی تبریز
- Type: Public university
- Chancellor: Dr. Mohammad Tghi Pirbabaei
- Location: Tabriz, East Azarbaijan Province, Iran
- Website: www.tabriziau.ac.ir

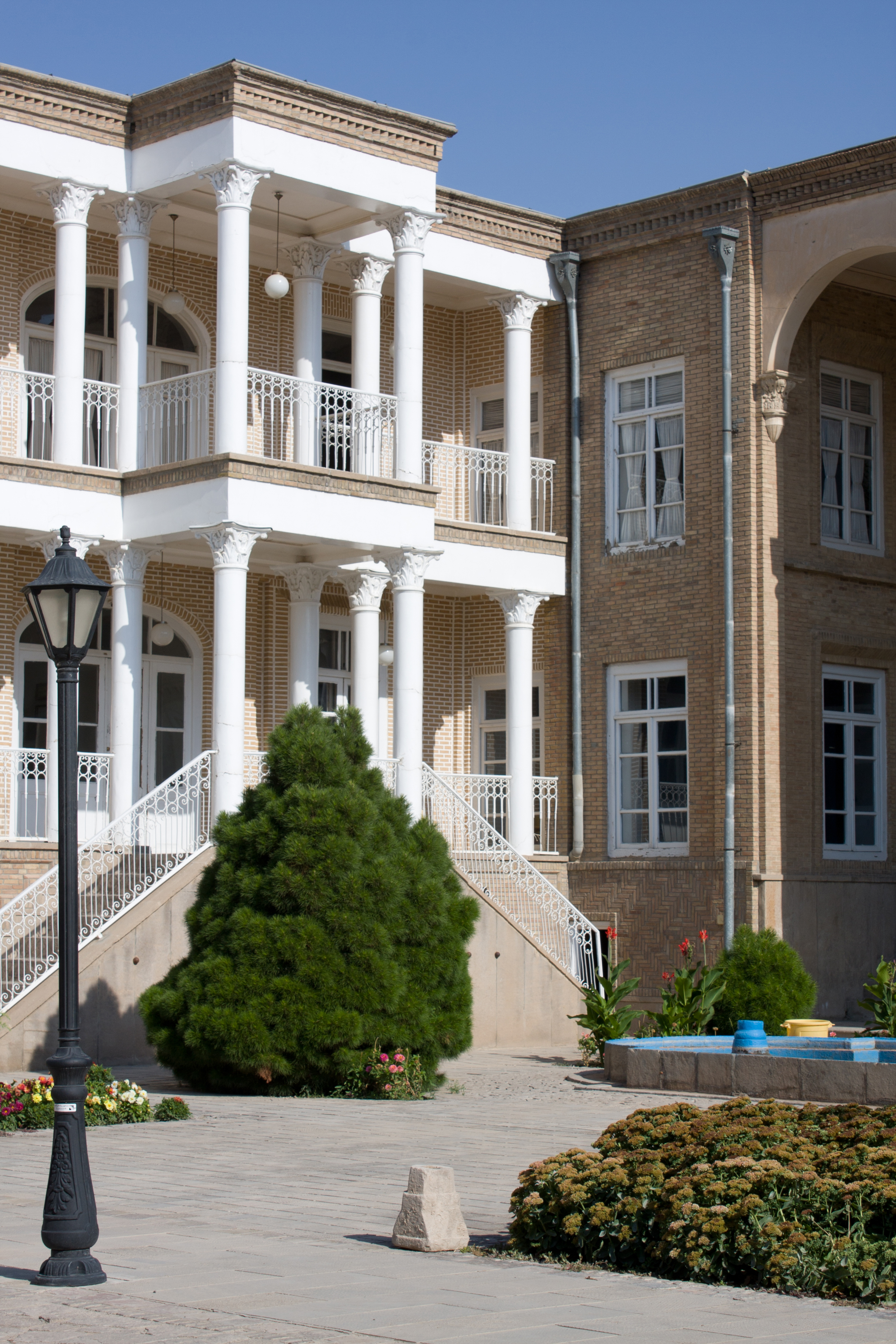
Kanjei zade house House is faculty of architecture

Tabriz Islamic Art University also known as Tabriz Art University is a public university located in Tabriz, East Azarbaijan, Iran. The university's major focus is on the Islamic art and architecture. The university was established in 1997. Part of the university's faculties separated from Sahand University of Technology.

== Campus ==
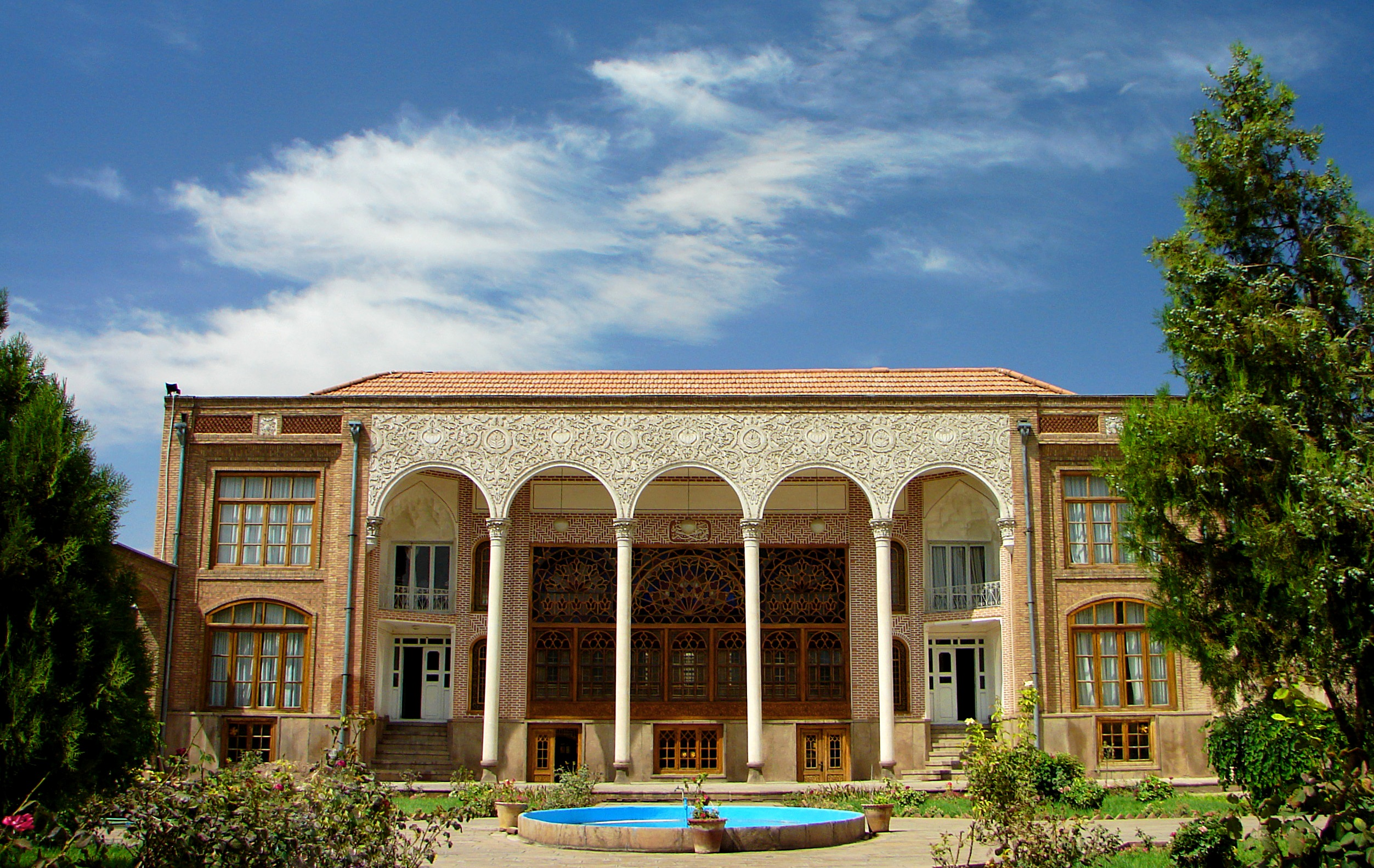
Behnam House is part of the School of Architecture of Tabriz Art University

=== Khosravi buildings ===
The main campus of the Tabriz Art University has an area of 36,000 square meters and includes the enrollment office, gymnasium, self-service dining, and library. The campus buildings are parts of an old leather factory that renovated for the university campus.

=== Behnam House ===
The other campus is located in Behnam House site.

== Faculties and Colleges ==
- Faculty of Architecture and Urban Planning
- Faculty of Multimedia
- Faculty of Islamic Design
- Faculty of Islamic Arts
- Faculty of Applied Arts
- Faculty of Carpet
- Faculty of Heris’s Carpet

== See also ==
- Higher education in Iran
- List of universities in Iran
