= Qari Bridge =

Stone bridge in Tabriz, Iran

Coordinates: 38°04′48.05″N 46°18′02.22″E

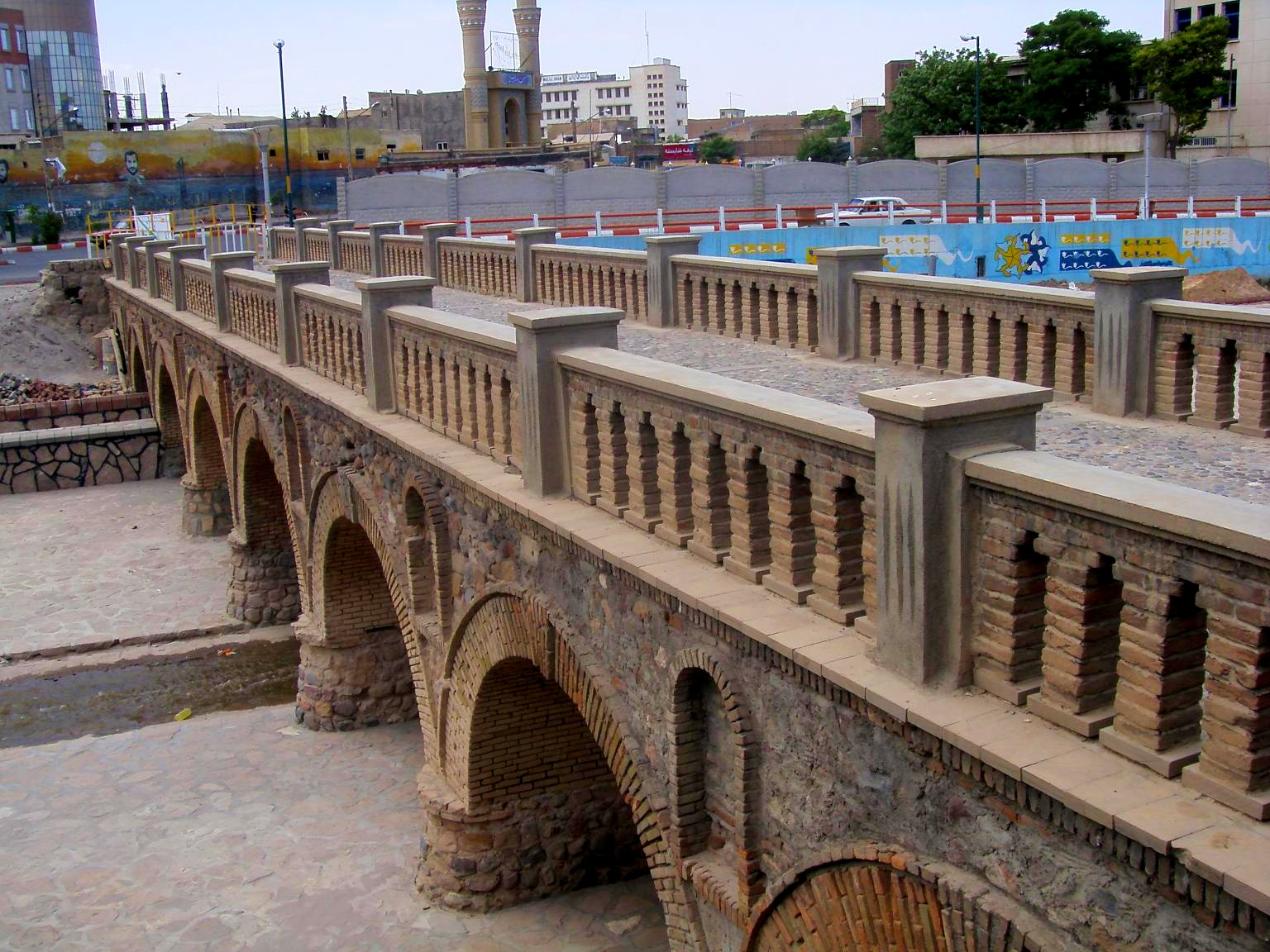
New pedestrian bridge built in Pahlavi period, west of Qari bridge

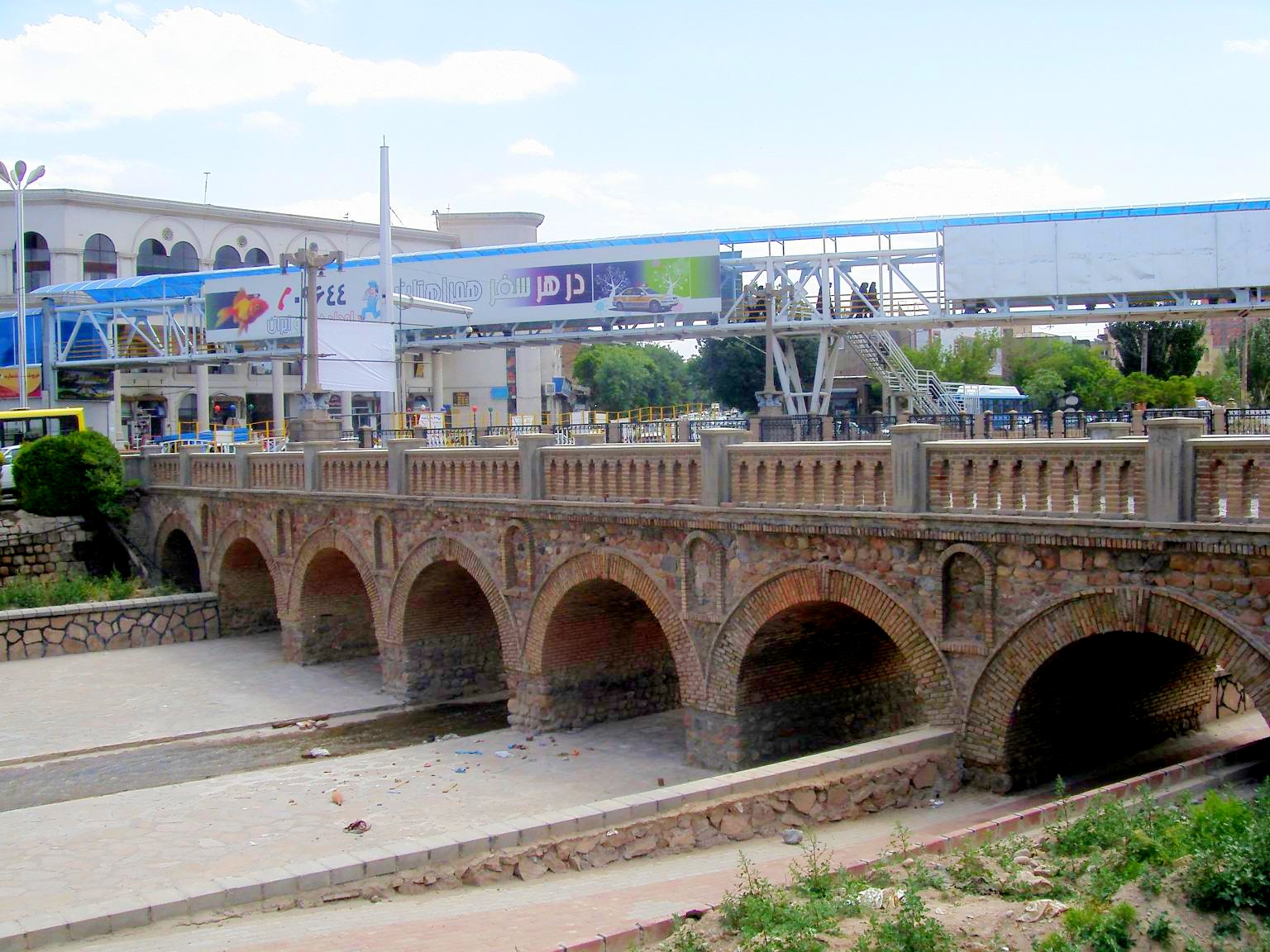

Qari Bridge is a historic stone bridge in Tabriz, Iran, over the Quri River. It has been built during Qajar dynasty, and is a part of Seghat-ol-eslam street, connecting Bazaar of Tabriz to the northern districts of Tabriz, among them Sheshgelan and Davachi. During Pahlavi dynasty, a smaller bridge was built for the pedestrians.
