= Aji Chay =

Coordinates: 37°45′N 45°42′E

Talkheh-Roud
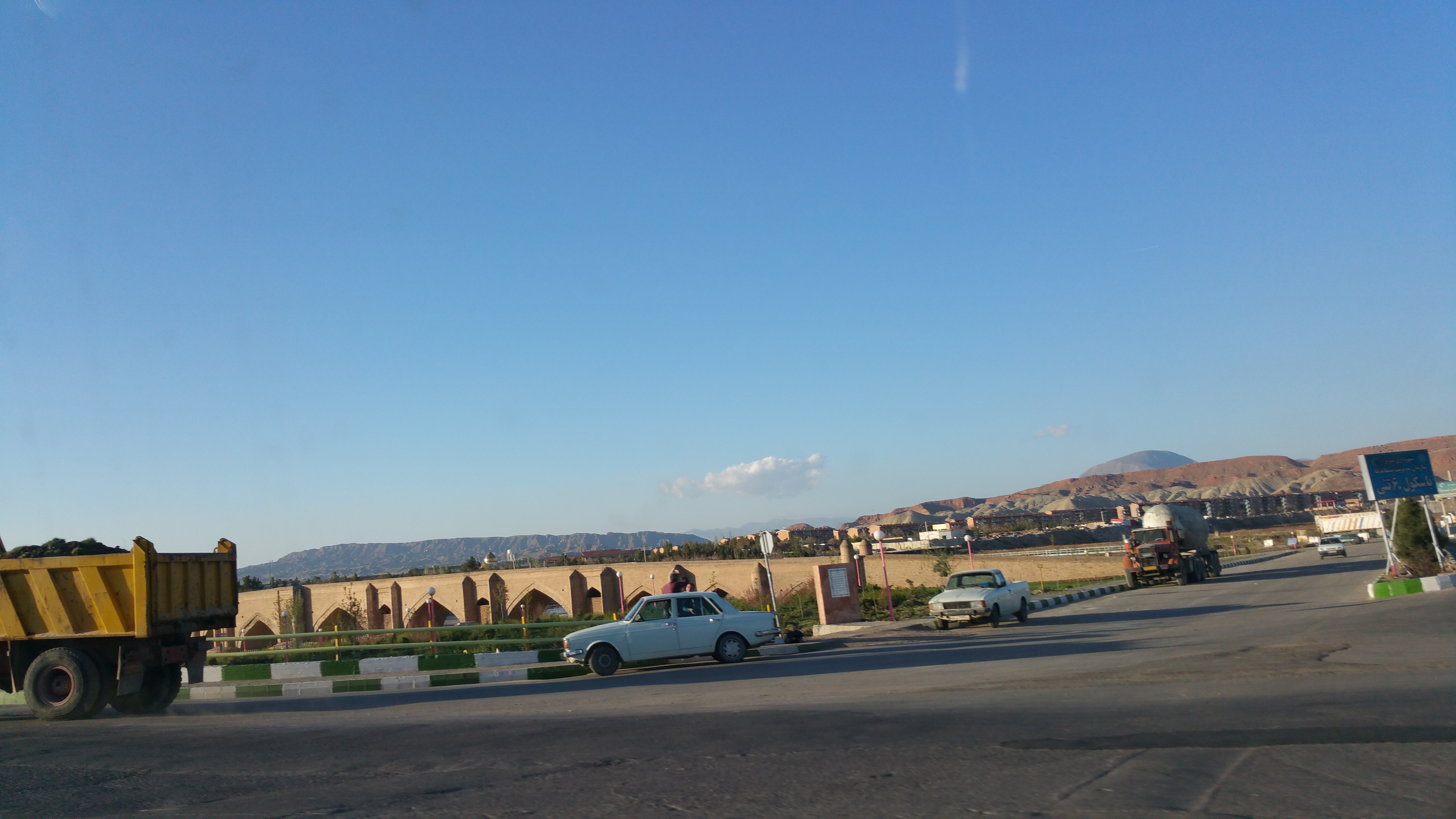
- Aji Chay bridge in northeast of Tabriz.

Location
- Country: Iran
- State: East Azerbaijan

Physical characteristics
- Source
  - location: East Azerbaijan, Iran
- Length: 265 km (165 mi)
- Discharge
  - location: Lake Urmia
  - maximum: 40.6 m^{3}/s (1,430 cu ft/s)

Basin features
- Tributaries
  - left: Vaneq River, Saidabad River, Quri Chay
  - right: Komur River, Sian River

The Aji Chay or Talkheh Rud (Azerbaijani: آجی چای Acıçay, Persian: تلخه رود Talkheh Rud, both meaning "bitter river") is a river in Azerbaijan region of Iran. Most of this 265-km long river flows in the East Azerbaijan Province.

The historic Aji Chay Bridge over the river, on the old Tabriz road to Marand, is just outside Tabriz and east of the Tabriz International Airport.

== See also ==
- Mehraneh roud
