= Mohammad-Hossein Shahriar =

Iranian poet (1906–1988)

Shahriar
- شهریار
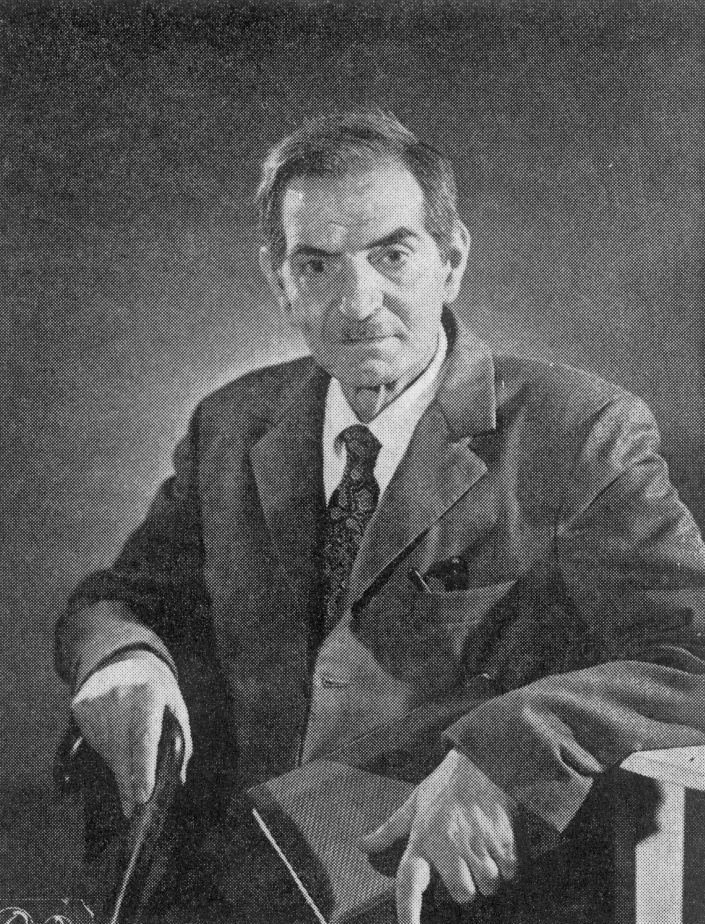
- Shahriar in his later years
- Born: 2 January 1906; Tabriz, Guarded Domains of Iran
- Died: 18 September 1988 (aged 82); Tehran, Iran
- Burial place: Maqbarato'sh-Sho'ara, Tabriz, Iran
- Occupation: Poet
- Known for: Persian poetry, Azerbaijani poetry
- Notable work: Heydar Babaya Salam
- Spouse: Azizeh Abde-Khaleghi (1947–1953)
- Children: 3

Seyyed Mohammad-Hossein Behjat Tabrizi (Persian: سید محمدحسین بهجت تبریزی, romanized: Seyyed Moḥammad Ḥoseyn Behjat Tabrīzī; 2 January 1906 – 18 September 1988), (Note: Azerbaijani: سیدمحمدحسین بهجت تبریزی, Azerbaijani romanization: Seyyid Maḥammad Ḥüseyn Behcat Tabrīzī) known by his pen name Shahriar, (Note: Azerbaijani/Persian: شهریار, Azerbaijani romanization: Şahriyār, Persian romanization: Shahriyār, Persian pronunciation) was an Iranian poet who composed works in both Azerbaijani and Persian. His most important work, Heydar Babaya Salam, is considered to be the pinnacle of Azerbaijani literature which gained great popularity in the Turkic world and was translated to more than 30 languages.

Contrary to many other figures of his time, Shahriar barely involved himself with political problems and ideologies. He was, however, known for his avid nationalism; in his work, numerous metaphors commending Persepolis, Zoroaster and Ferdowsi are made. Many of his writings were also motived by his religious beliefs, and he composed very popular poems in praise of Ali ibn Abi Talib, the first Imam of Shia Islam.

== Biography ==
Mohammad Hossein Shahriar was one of the first Azerbaijanis of Iran to write a significant collection of poetry in the Azerbaijani language. Born in 1906 in Tabriz, he received his elementary education, including the Divan of Hafez, under his father's supervision. Shahriar's first formal education was at the Motahhari (former Mansoor High School) Secondary School in Tabriz. He subsequently studied at the Dar-ol-Fonoun (former higher education school) in Tehran. Although he studied medicine in college, he dropped out just before getting his diploma and went to Khorasan, where he found a job as a notary public and bank clerk. He returned to Tehran in 1935 and started working in the Agricultural Bank of Iran.

During the 1945–1946 Soviet occupation of Iranian Azerbaijan and ascendancy of the separatist Azerbaijani Democratic Party, Shahriar composed poems in glorification of Iran's national unity.

He received an honorary professorship from the University of Tabriz in literature in 1967.

He initially published his poems under his given name, Behjat, but later chose the name Shahriar. He published his first book of poems in 1929. His poems were mainly influenced by Hafez, a famous Persian poet, and Khasta Qasim, an old Azerbaijani poet.

His most famous work in Azerbaijani is Heydar Babaya Salam, published in 1954, which won immense popularity and has been translated into more than 30 languages and numerous plays all over the world.

== Works ==
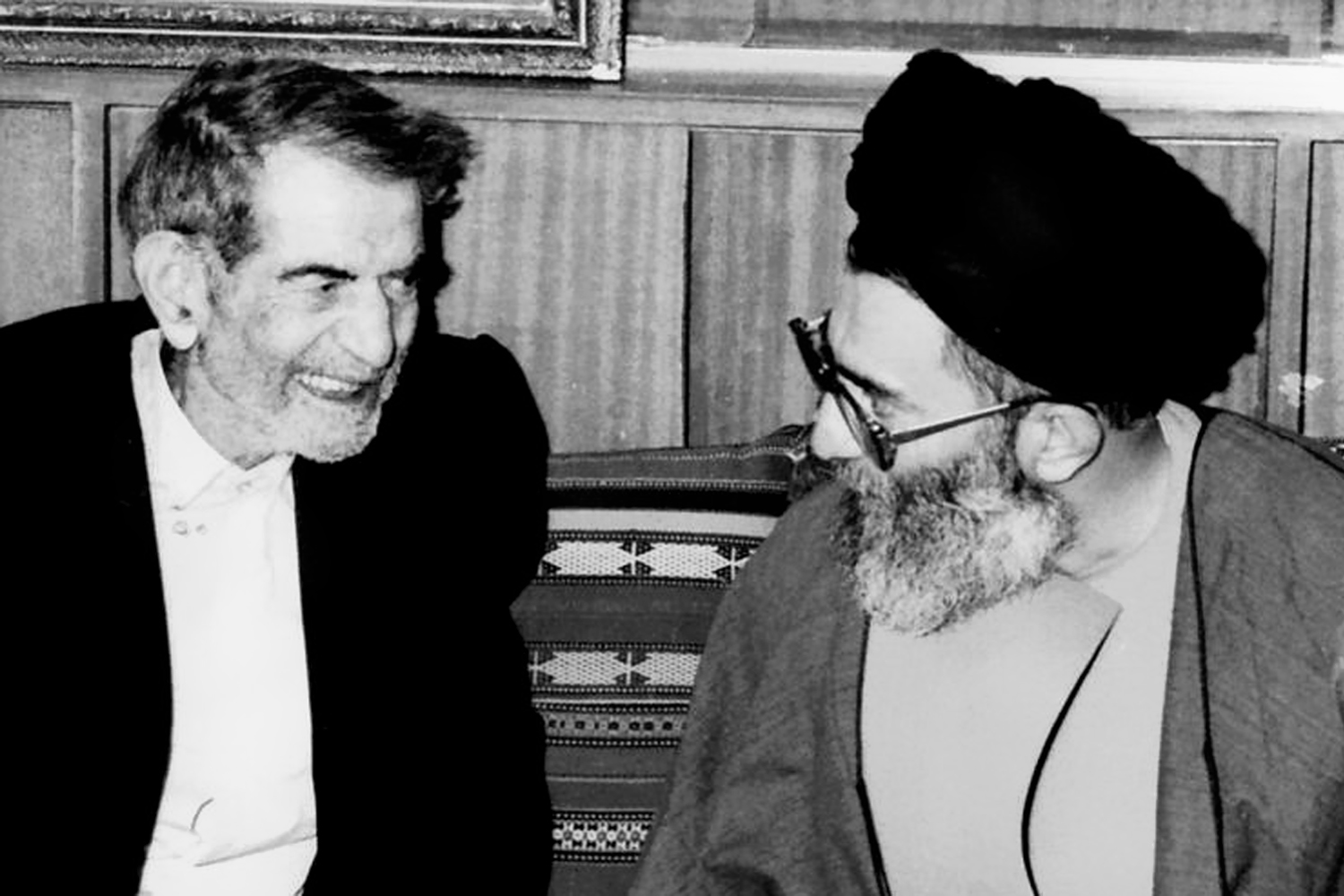
Shahriar meeting with Ali Khamenei in July 1987

The poet began by composing tragic poetry. Many of his bittersweet memories are reflected in his books Hazyan-e Del, Heydar Baba, and Mumiyai. Heydar Baba, composed in Azeri and later translated into Persian, was for a long time on the top ten best-seller list in Tehran. Heydar Baba is the name of a mountain where the poet spent his childhood. He also wrote a book of epic poems, Takht-e Jamshid.

He was interested in humanistic issues and in his poem "A letter to Einstein" he criticised the result of his scientific work that was abused as the nuclear weapon.

Shahriar was a critic of the usage of the Latin alphabet for Turkic languages, writing a poem on the topic called Şeyṭān Alifbāsı (Azerbaijani: شیطان الفباسی, lit. 'Satan's Alphabet') in 1986. In the poem, he called the Arabic alphabet the script of the Qur'an, while calling the Cyrillic and Latin alphabets the scripts of Satan, calling on Turkic-speakers to reject the usage of the latter. He also declared in it that Iran is in a similar situation to the Battle of Karbala, referring to the then-ongoing Iran–Iraq War, and called Turkic-speaking Muslims to jihad. The poem was broadcast via Radio to both the Soviet Union and Turkey, with Shahriar reciting it in both Istanbul Turkish and Azerbaijani in two separate recordings that were disseminated.

Shahriar's verse takes diverse forms, including lyrics, quatrains, couplets, odes, and elegies. One of his love poems, Hala Chera, was set to music by Ruhollah Khaleqi. The composition for orchestra and solo voice became one of his most well-known works. One of the major reasons for the success of Shahriar's work is the sincerity of his words. Since he uses colloquial language in the context of poetry, his poems are understandable and effective for a broad segment of the public.

Shahriar was a talented calligrapher who wrote his own copy of the Qur'an, played the setar very well, and had a keen interest in music. He was a very close friend of the Persian musician and highly respected teacher, Abdolhossein Saba.

== Death ==
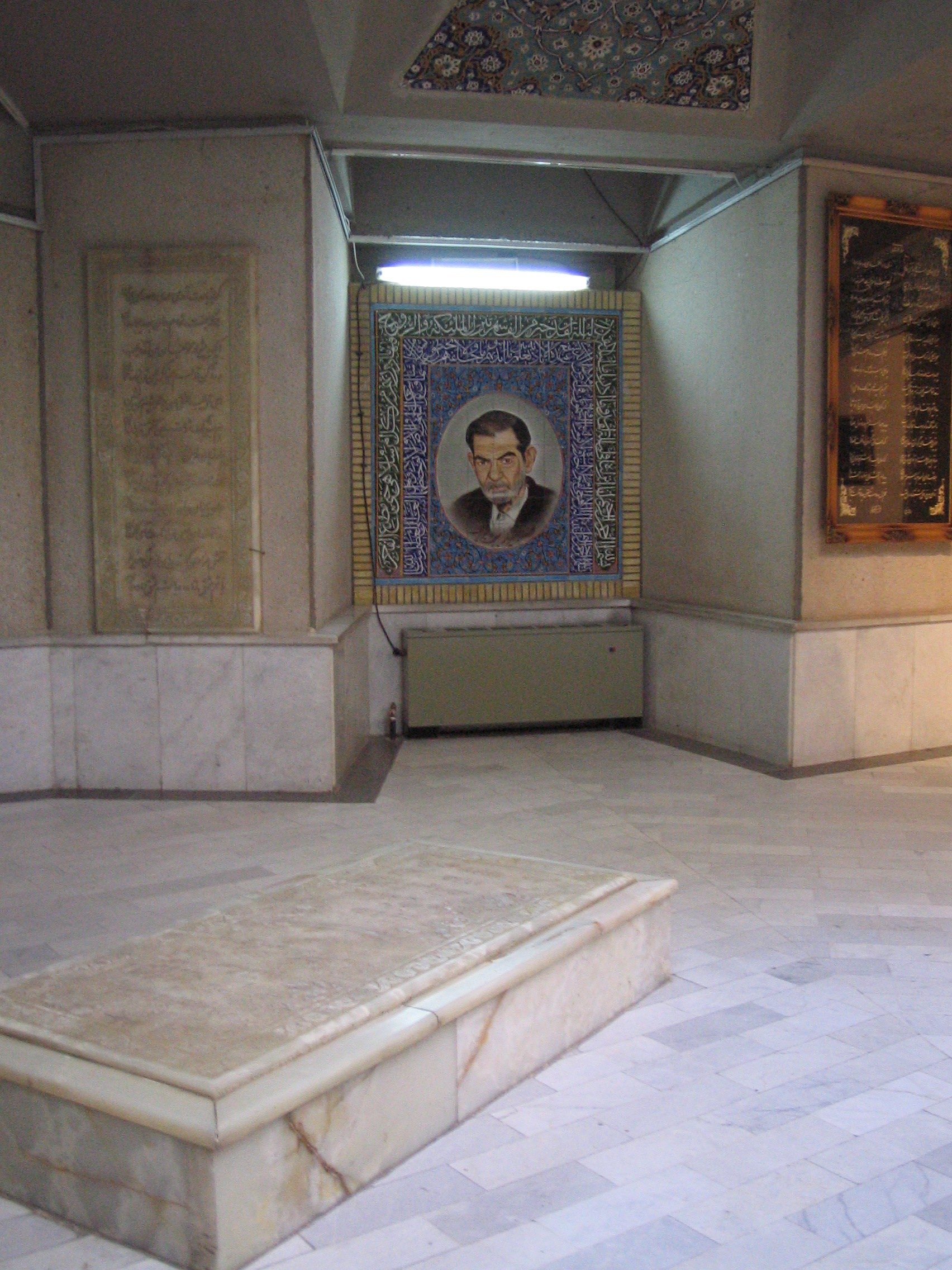
Shahriar's tomb in the Mausoleum of Poets

His day of death is named the "national day of poem" in Iran. A television series about his life, directed by Kamal Tabrizi, aired on IRIB channel 2.

He died on 18 September 1988 in one of the Tehran's hospitals and his body was transferred to Tabriz and was buried in Maqbarato'sh-Sho'ara (Mausoleum of Poets).
