= Mausoleum of Poets =

Memorial in Tabriz, Iran

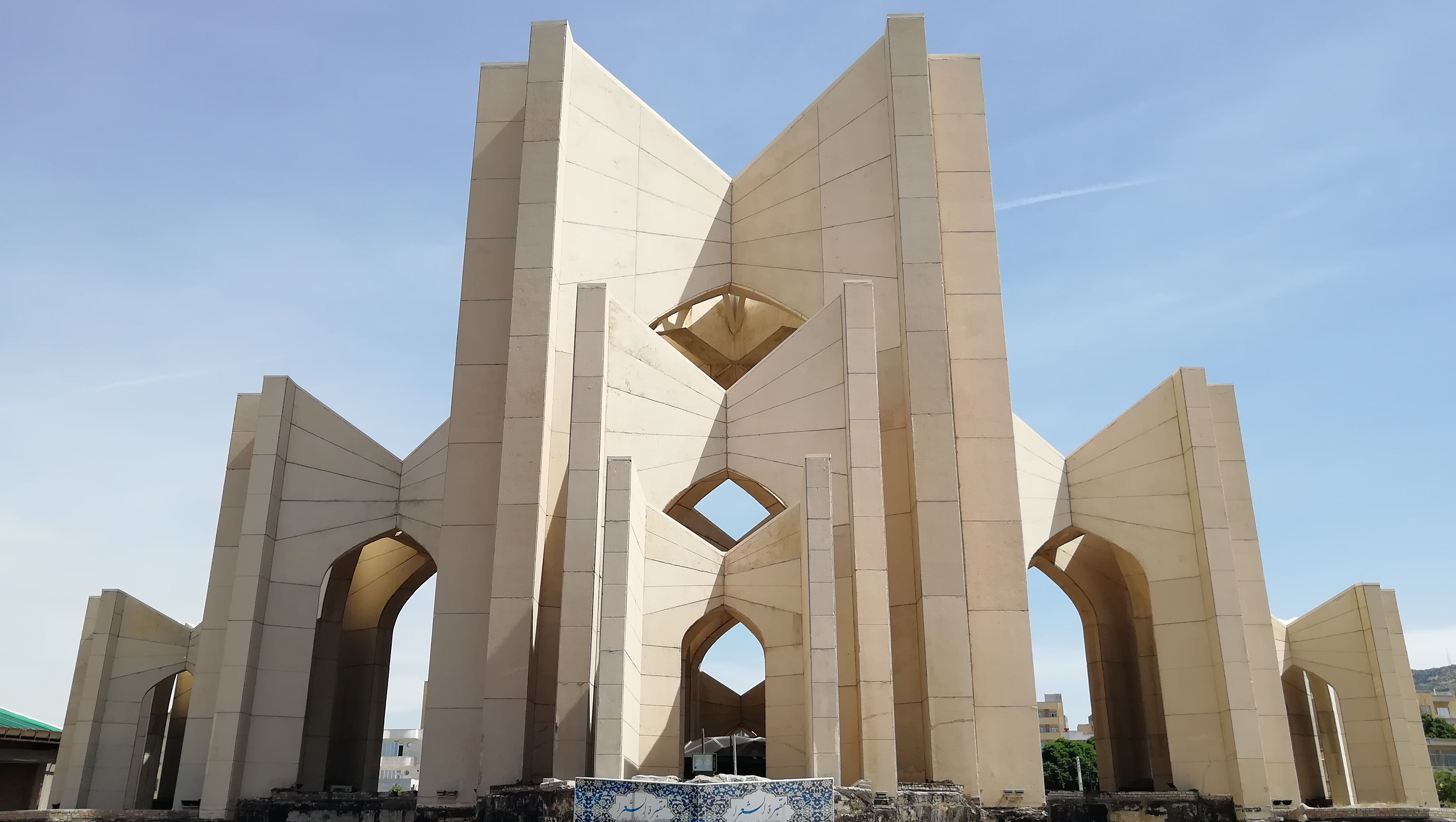
- Interactive map of the Mausoleum of Poets area

General information
- Location: Tabriz, Iran

Maqbarat-o-shoara (Persian: مقبرةالشعرا) or the Mausoleum of Poets (Persian: مزارِ شاعران, romanized: Mazār-e Shāerān or Persian: مزارِ سرایندگان, romanized: Mazār-e Sorāyandegān) is a Maqbara (cemetery) belonging to classical and contemporary Iranian poets, mystics and other notable people, located in the Surkhab district of Tabriz in Iran.

The dome.

Grave of Shahryar.

Since the 1970s, there have been attempts to renovate the graveyard area. Some work has been carried out like the construction of a new symbolic building on this site.

== Notable burials ==
- Asadi Tusi (999–1072) – poet
- Qatran Tabrizi (1009–1072) – poet
- Anvari Abivardi (1126–1189) – poet
- Khaqani (1122–1190) – poet
- Zahir-al-Din Faryabi (d. 1202) – poet
- Zulfaqar Shirvani (d. 1290) – poet
- Humam-i Tabrizi (1238–1314) – poet
- Assar Tabrizi (1325–1390) – poet
- Maghrebi Tabrizi (1348–1406) – poet
- Aziz Khan Mokri (d. 1870) – army general
- Mohammad-Hossein Shahriar (Shahriar) (1906–1988) – poet
- Mahmoud Melmasi (Azarm) (1917–1991) – poet
- Aziz Dowlatabadi (Darvish) (1922–2009) – poet

== See also ==
- The Amir Nezam House
- Behnam House
- House of Seghat-ol-Eslam
- Constitution House of Tabriz
- Imamzadeh Hamzah, Tabriz
