= Khaqani Park =

Park in Tabriz, Iran

Coordinates: 38°04′25.58″N 46°18′01.84″E

Khaqani Park (Persian: پارک خاقانی), or Boostan-e Khaqani (بوستان خاقانی), is a small park in Tabriz, Iran. The park is named after Khaqani Shirvani, who died in Tabriz.

== See also ==
- Khaqani
- Tabriz
- Shah-goli
