= Khoshgenab =

Khoshkanab خشکناب
- Village
- Location within Iran
- Coordinates: 37°41′11″N 47°07′21″E
- Country: Iran
- Province: East Azerbaijan
- County: Bostanabad
- Bakhsh: Tekmeh Dash
- Rural District: Abbas-e Sharqi

Population (2006)
  - Total: 22
- Time zone: UTC+3:30 (IRST)
  - Summer (DST): UTC+4:30 (IRDT)

Khoshkanab (Persian: خشگناب, also Romanized as Khoshkanab; also known as Khoshkanab is a village in Abbas-e Sharqi Rural District, Tekmeh Dash District, Bostanabad County, East Azerbaijan Province, Iran. At the 2006 census, its population was 22, in 8 families.
