= Behnam House =

Historic building in Tabriz, Iran

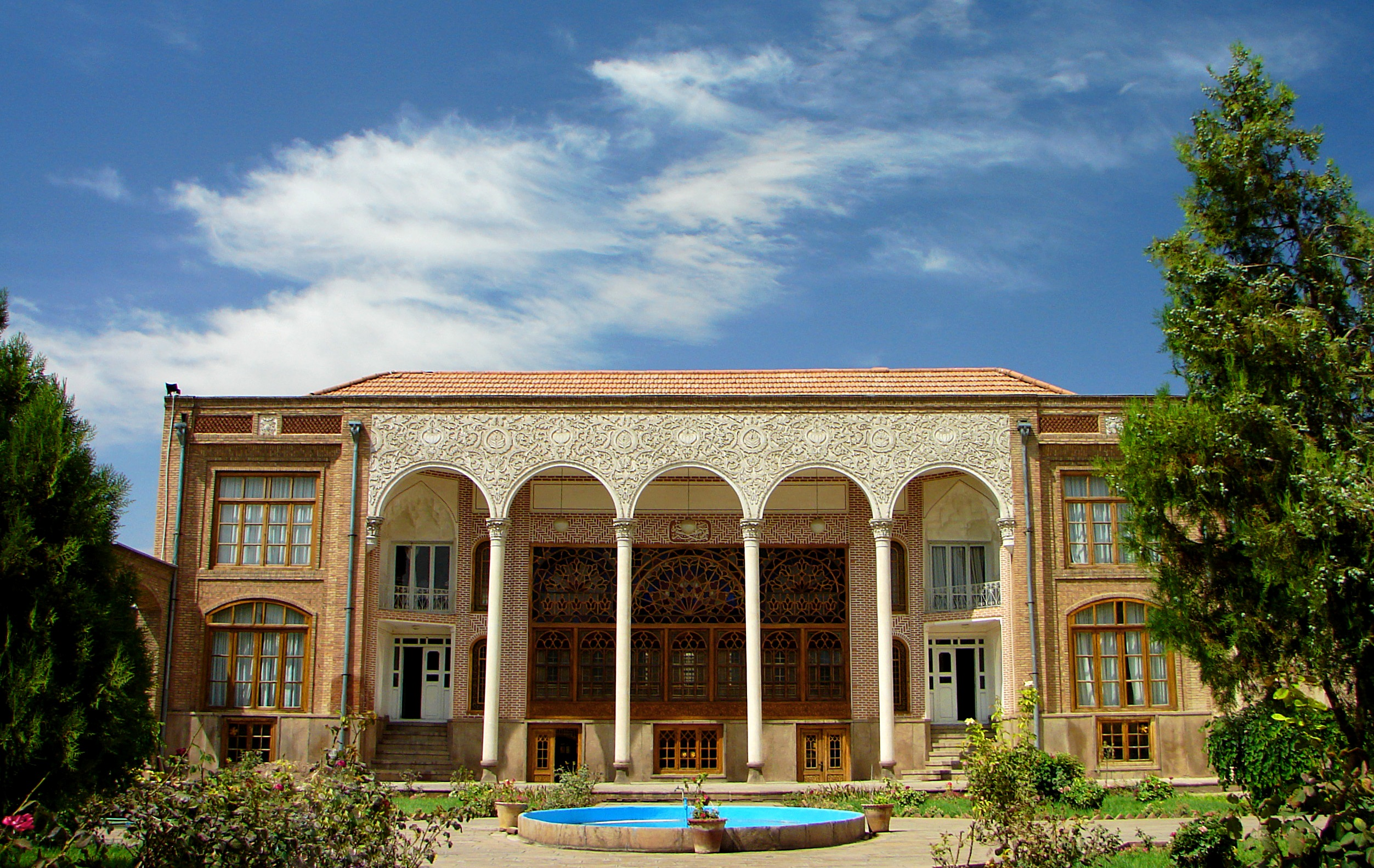
- The Winter Building of Behnam House which stands to the north of the inner courtyard and faces towards the South.
- Interactive map of the Behnam House area

General information
- Location: Tabriz, Iran

Behnam House (Persian: خانه بهنام) is a historic building in Tabriz, Iran. The edifice was built during the late Zand era (1750–1794) and the early Qajar era (1781–1925), as a residential house.

During the reign of Naser al-Din Shah Qajar (1848–1896) this building was substantially renovated and embellished with ornamental paintings. The house consists of a main building, referred to as the Winter Building, and a smaller structure, referred to as the Summer Building. The Winter Building is a two-storey symmetrical construction standing on a basement. Like many traditional houses in Iran, this house has an inner (اندرونی, andaruni) and an outer (بيرونی, biruni) courtyard, the former being the larger of the two. In the course of a 2009 renovation project, some hitherto unknown miniature frescoes were discovered in this house which were restored by specialists. The Behnām House is part of the School of Architecture of Tabriz Art University.

== Gallery ==
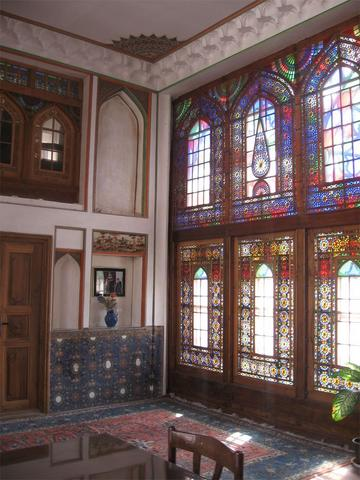
Main hall on the first floor

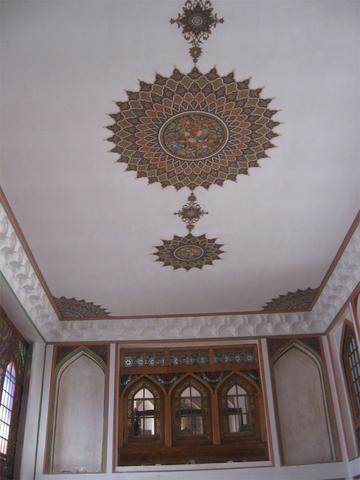
Ceiling of the main hall

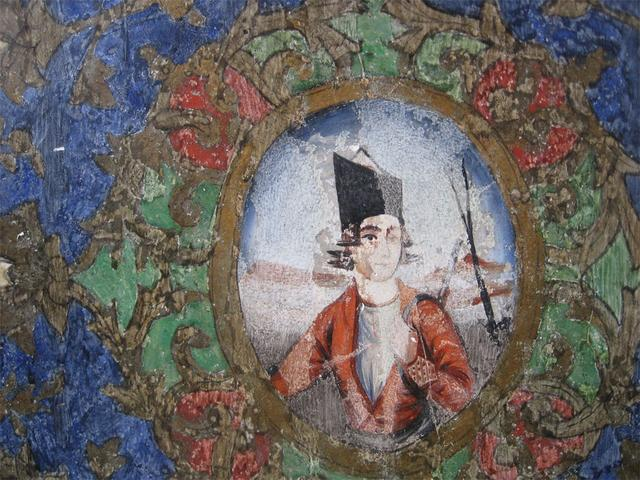
Detail of a fresco

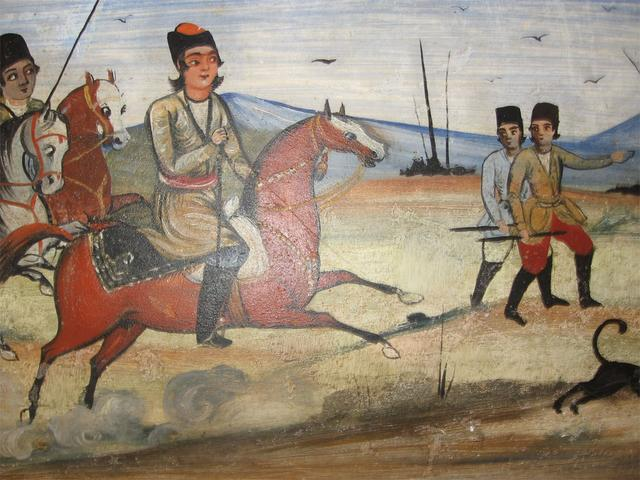
Detail of a fresco

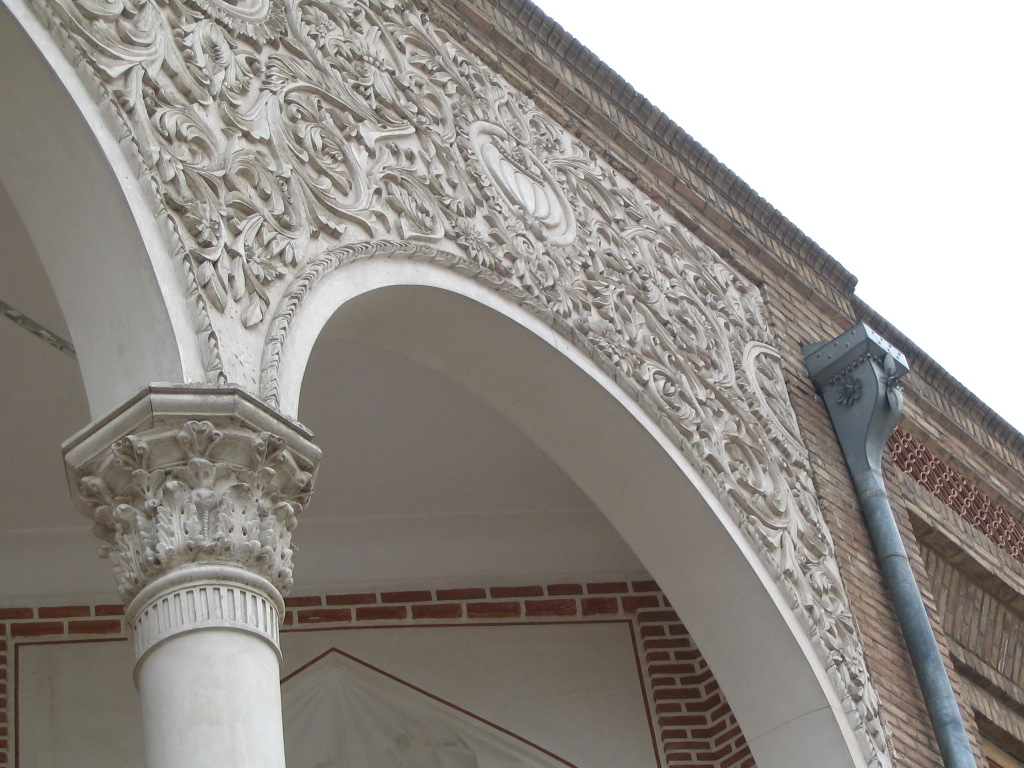

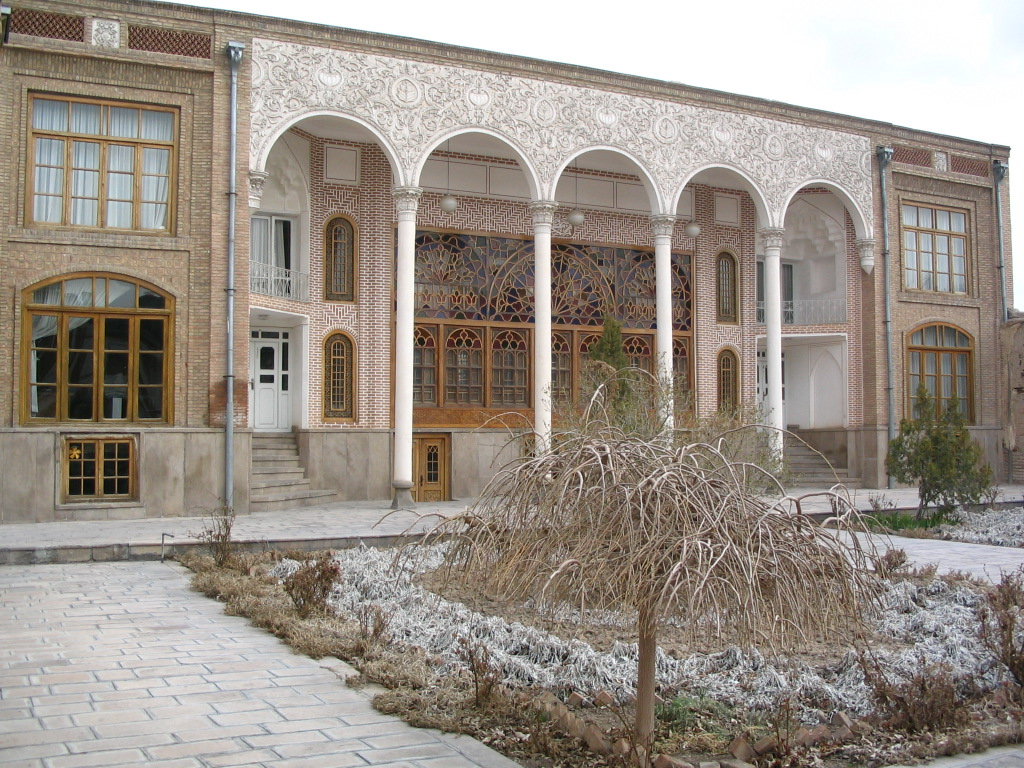

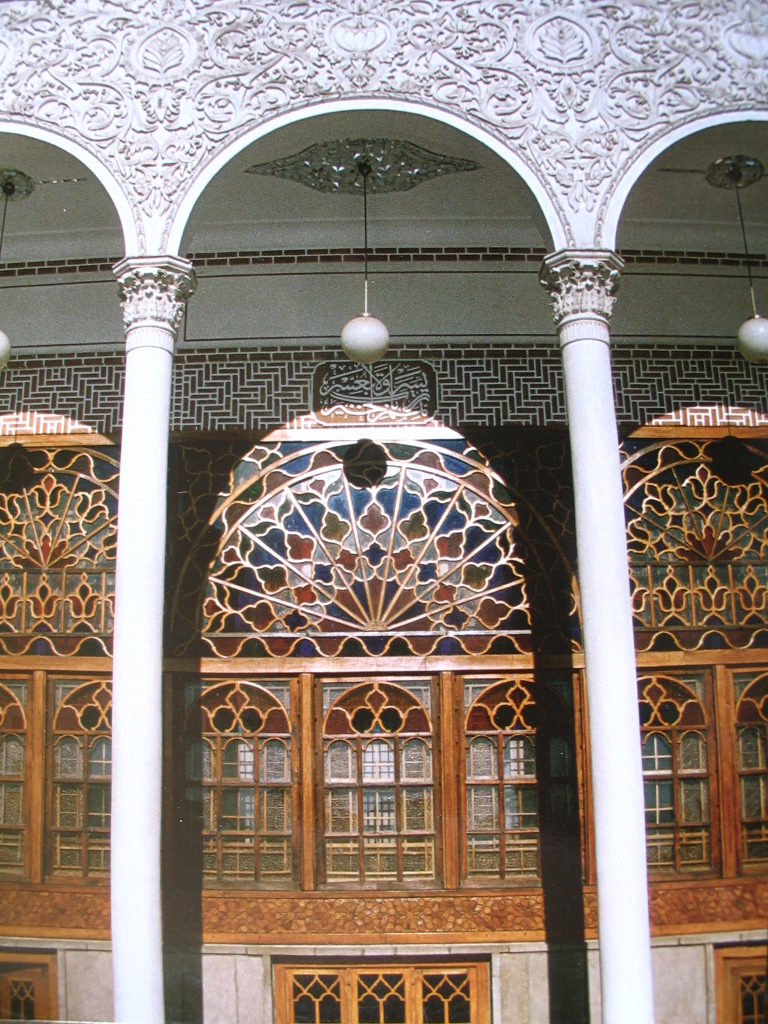

== Location ==
The Behnām House is located in the city center of Tabriz, Maqsudiyeh Street, behind Tabriz Municipality.
