= Museum of Ostad Bohtouni =

Iranian museum

Coordinates: 38°05′03″N 46°18′14″E

Museum of Ostad Bohtouni is a museum in the Sheshghelan suburb of Tabriz, north-western Iran.
