= Golestan Park =

Park in Tabriz, Iran

Coordinates: 38°04′36.66″N 46°16′49.91″E

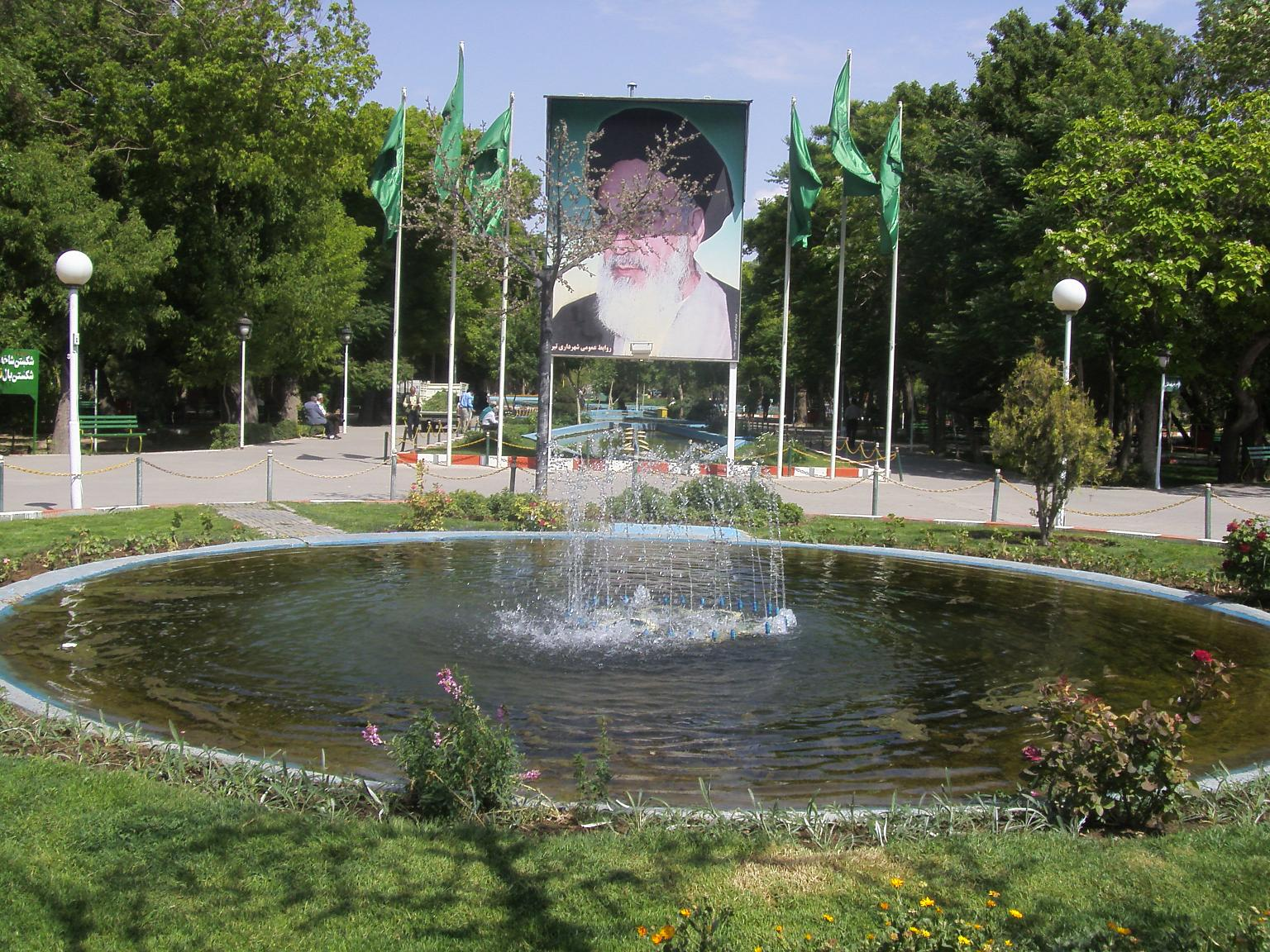
Golestan Park

Golestan Park is a park in Tabriz, Iran. The place, which was originally used as a public cemetery, was changed to a city park during the second Pahlavi era. A marble clock tower, which has been devastated recently, had been founded at the front of main entrance of the park.

== See also ==
- Gajil
