= Quri Chay =

River in East Azerbaijan province, Iran

Coordinates: 38°04′36″N 46°18′36″E

Quru River
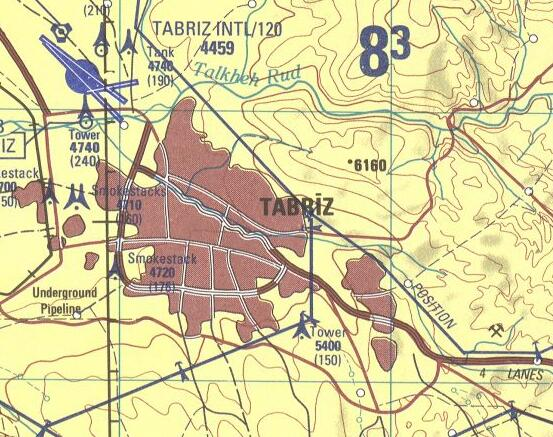
- Native name: قورو چای (Persian); Quru Chay (Persian); قورو چای (Azerbaijani); Quru Çay (Azerbaijani)

Location
- Country: Iran
- State: East Azerbaijan

Physical characteristics
- Discharge
  - location: Aji River

The Quri River or Quru Chay or Quri Chay (Persian: قورو چای; Azerbaijani: Quru Çay قورو چای) is a river in East Azerbaijan province of Iran, in the endorheic basin of Lake Urmia. It originates in the mountains south of Tabriz and joins the Aji Chay just northeast of central Tabriz. Divided by the Quri, the northern and southern parts of Tabriz are connected by several bridges.

The river is limited by two flood control walls and two southern and northern parkways calls Chaykenar Parkway, which almost bisect Tabriz through the middle to northern and southern half. The Chaykenar Parkways connect the most eastern and western parts of the city.

The name "Quri Chay" means "dry river", and at the end of the 20th century the water, when present, was polluted and undrinkable.

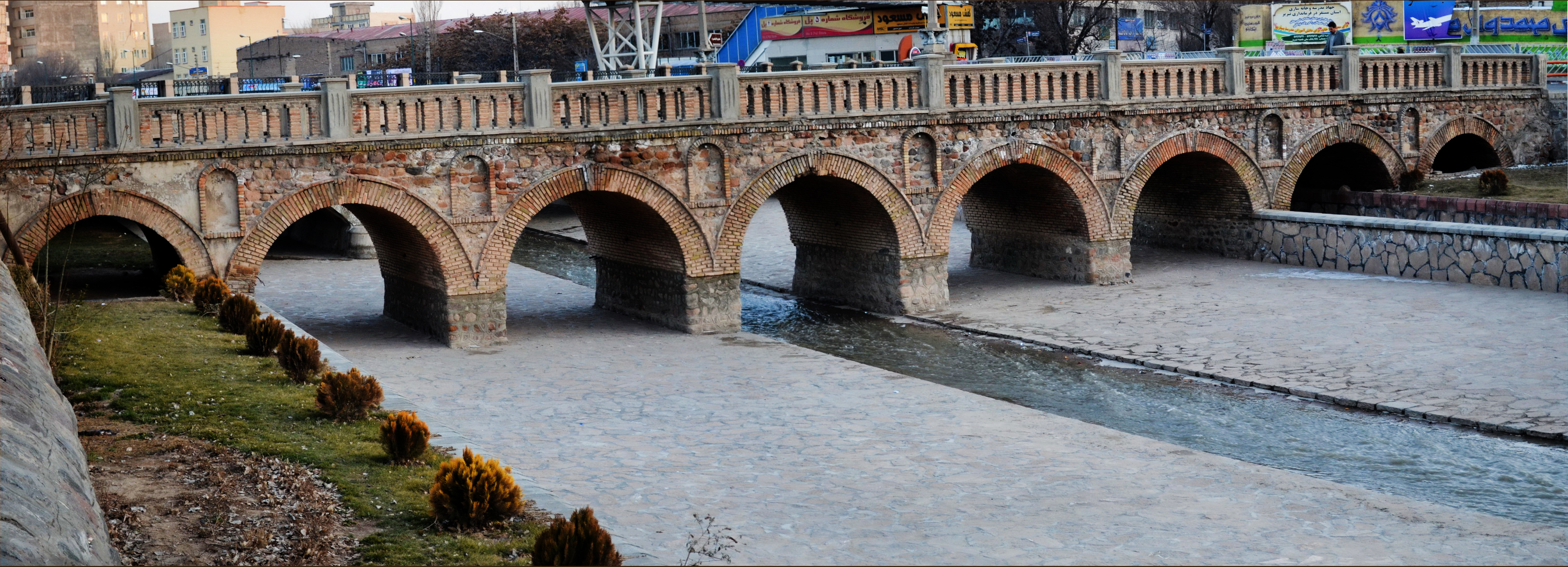
Qari Bridge over Quri Chay

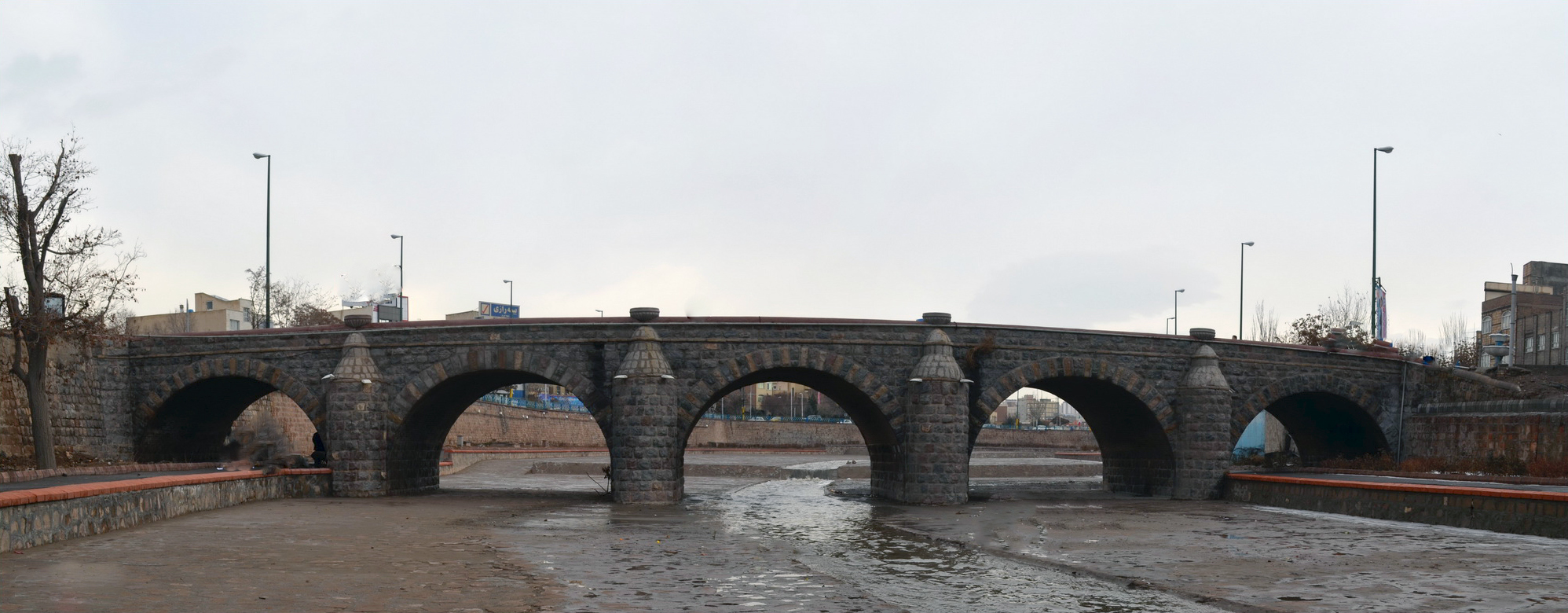
Pole-Sanghi over Quri River

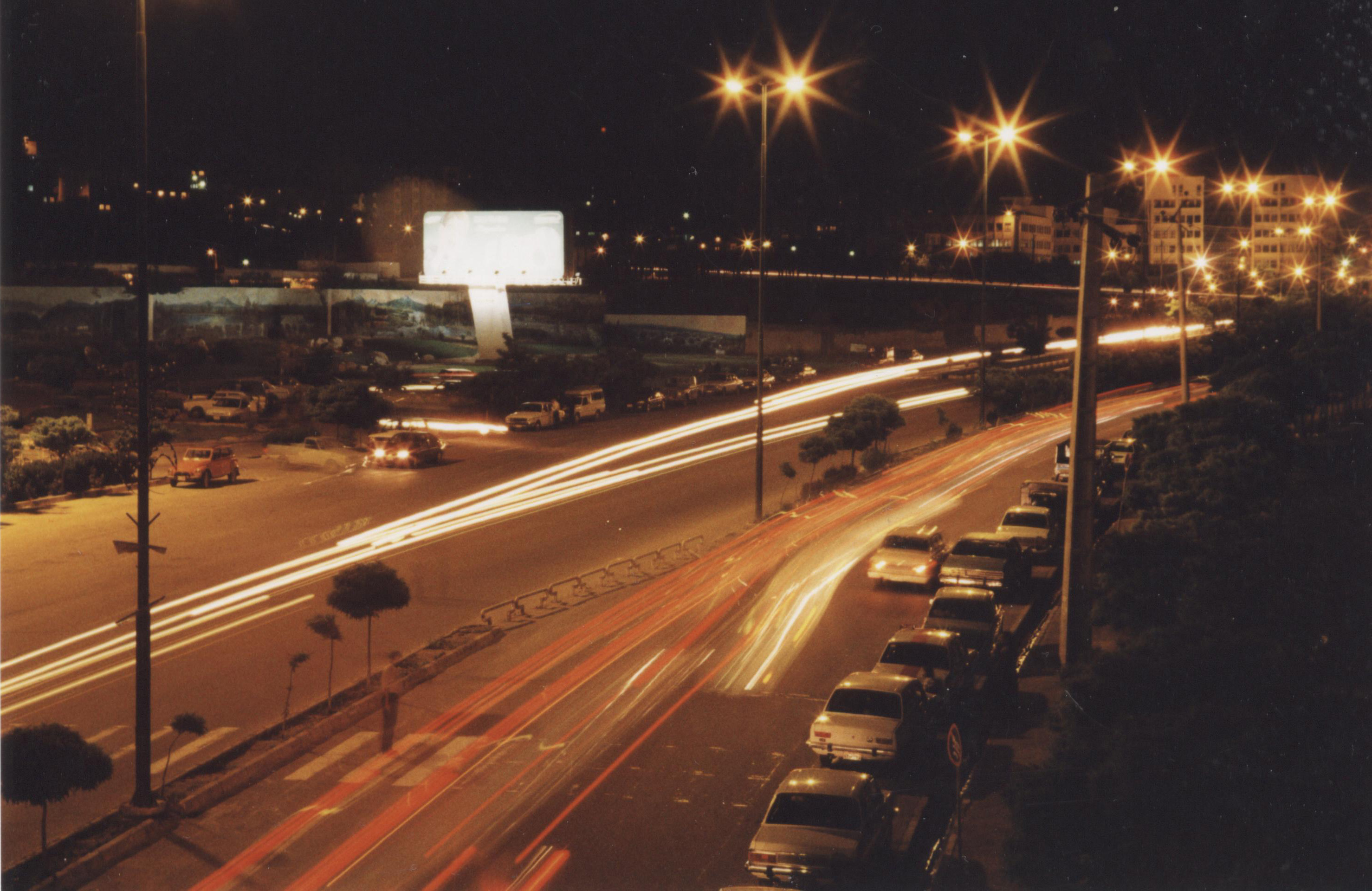
Chay Kenar highway at night
