= List of museums in Iran =

This is a list of museums in Iran.

Name	Persian native name	City	Year established	Type	Photo
Abbasi House	خانهٔ عباسی‌ها - Khāneh-ye 'Abbāsihā	Kashan	late 18th century	Historical House	
Afif-Abad Garden	باغ عفیف آباد - Bāq e Afif-Ābād	Shiraz	1863	Garden	
Ālī Qāpū	عالی‌ قاپو - Āli Qāpu	Isfahan	1597	Palace	
Ameri House	خانهٔ عامری‌ها - Khāneh-ye 'Āmerihā	Kashan	19th century	Historical House	
Amir Nezam House	خانه امیرنظام - Khaneh-e Amir Nezām	Tabriz	Building dates to late 18th to early 19th century, museum established in 2008	Historical House	
Ardabil Anthropology Museum	موزه مردم‌شناسی اردبیل	Ardabil	Building dates to 15th century, museum established in 1999	Anthropology Museum	
Archbishop Ardak Manoukian Museum	موزه اسقف اعظم آرداک مانوکیان	Tehran	Building dates to 1945	Anthropology Museum, Church	
Arg of Karim Khan	ارگ کریم خان - Arg-e Karim Khan	Shiraz	1767	Palace	
Azerbaijan Museum	موزهٔ آذربایجان	Tabriz	1958	Museum	
Baqcheh Jooq Palace	کاخ و موزه باغچه‌جوق	Maku/Bazargan	late 19th century	Palace	
Ferdows Garden and Cinema Museum of Tehran	باغ فردوس - Bāq e Ferdows	Tehran	Building dates to mid-19th century, museum established in 2009	Garden, Museum	
Behnam House		Tabriz		Historical House	
Borujerdis House	خانهٔ بروجردی‌ها - Khāneh-ye Borujerdihā	Kashan	1857	Historical House	
Carpet Museum of Iran	موزه فرش ایران	Tehran	1976	Museum	
Chehel Sotoun	چهل ستون	Isfahan	1614 or 1647	Palace	
Constitution House of Isfahan	(خانه مشروطه (اصفهان	Isfahan		Historical House	
Constitution House of Tabriz	(خانه مشروطه (تبریز	Tabriz	Building dates to 1868	Historical House	
Contemporary Arts Museum Isfahan	گنجینه هنرهای تزئینی و هنرهای معاصر اصفهان	Isfahan	Building dates to Safavid Era (16th to 18th centuries)	Museum	
Dr.Hesabi Museum		Tehran		Museum	
Eram Garden	باغ ارم - Bāq e Eram	Shiraz	11th - 14th century AD	Garden	
Eyn-ol-Doleh	عین الدوله - Eynol-doleh	Tehran	Building dates to 19th century	Museum, Palace	
Fin Garden	باغ فین - Bagh-e Fin	Kashan	1590	Garden	
Ganjali Bathhouse Museum of Anthropology		Kerman	Building dates to 1631, museum established in 1971	Anthropology Museum	
Ganjali Mint		Kerman	Building dates to 1625, museum established in 1970		
Glass & Ceramics Museum of Tehran	موزهٔ آبگینه و سفالینه ایران - Muze ye Abgineh va Sofalineh ye Irān	Tehran	1937	Museum, Historical House	
Golestan Palace	کاخ گلستان – Kāx e Golestān	Tehran	1865	Museum, Palace	
Haidarzadeh House	خانه حیدرزاده	Tabriz	1870	Museum, Historical House	
Hariree House	خانه دكتر حريري	Tabriz	Building dates to the Qajar period	Museum, Historical House	
Hamedan Museum of Natural History	موزه تاریخ طبیعی همدان	Hamedan		Natural History Museum	
Hassan Modarres Museum	موزه حسن مدرس	Kashmar			
Hasht Behesht	هشت‌بهشت	Isfahan	1669	Palace	
Hazrat Ma'soomeh Holy Shrine Museum		Qom	1926	Museum, Mosque	
Islamic Revolution & Holy Defense Museum	موزه انقلاب اسلامی ودفاع مقدس	Tehran	2014	Museum, Mosque, Garden, tools, Digital, Technology	
House of Seghat ol Islam	خانه ثقةالاسلام	Tabriz		Historical House	
House of Sheykh ol Islam	خانه شیخ الاسلام و شرکاء	Isfahan	Building dates to the Qajar period	Historical House	
Iranian Electrical Industry Museum				Museum	
Iron Age Museum	موزه عصر آهن	Tabriz		Museum	
Isfahan Music Museum		Isfahan		Museum	
Khorasan Great Museum		Razavi Khorasan province		Museum	
Khosro Abad Mansion	کۆشکی خوسرەو ئاباد (Kurdish)	Kurdistan province	1808	Historical mansion and museum	
Malik National Museum of Iran	کتابخانه و موزه ملی ملک	Tehran	1996	Museum	
Marble Palace	کاخ مرمر - Kākh-e Marmar	Tehran	1937	Palace	
Masoudieh Palace		Tehran	1879	Historical House	
Measure Museum	موزه سنجش	Tabriz		Museum, Historical House	
Moghadam Museum		Tehran		Museum, Historical House	
Muharram Museum		Tabriz			
Museum of Ostad Bohtouni	موزه استاد بهتونی	Tabriz			
Museum of Contemporary Art Ahwaz		Ahvaz	2005	Museum	
Music Museum of Tehran		Tehran		Museum	
Museum of Decorative Arts	گنجینه هنرهای تزئینی و هنرهای معاصر اصفهان	Isfahan	Building dates to 16th century, museum established in 1995	Museum	
Museum of Natural History and Technology		Shiraz		Natural History Museum	
Natural History Museum		Zanjan		Natural History Museum	
Azerbaijan Nomads Museum		East Azerbaijan		Museum	
Natural History Museum		Mashhad		Natural History Museum	
Natural History Museum		Sabzevar		Natural History Museum	
Negarestan Garden and Kamal-ol-Molk Museum of Tehran		Tehran		Garden, Art Gallery	
National Car Museum of Iran	موزه ملی خودرو ایران	Karaj	2001	Museum	
National Jewelry Museum		Tehran		Museum	
National Museum of Iran and Islamic Period Museum	موزهٔ ملی ایران - Mūze-ye Melli-ye Irān	Tehran	1937	Museum	
Natural History Museum of Isfahan	(موزه تاریخ طبیعی (اصفهان	Isfahan	Building dates to 15th century	Natural History Museum	
Niavaran Palace Complex	مجموعه کاخ نیاوران – Majmue ye Niāvarān	Tehran	Buildings date to Qajar and Pahlavi period	Museum, Palace	
Pars Museum of Shiraz	موزه پارس	Shiraz	Building dates to Zand period, museum established in 1936	Museum	
Pearl Palace	کاخ مروارید	Karaj	1972	Palace	
Pottery Museum of Tabriz	موزه سفال	Tabriz	Building dates to Qajar period	Museum	
Qasr Prison	موزه‌ زندان قصر - Muze-ye Zendān-e Qasr)	Tehran	1790	Prison	
Qazvinis' House	خانه قزوینی‌ها	Isfahan	Late 19th century	Historical House	
Ramsar Palace	کاخ مرمر رامسر	Ramsar	1937	Palace	
Reza Abbasi Museum	موزه رضا عباسی	Tehran	1977	Museum	
Saat Tower	کاخ شهرداری تبریز	Tabriz	1934	Museum, Palace	
Sa'dabad Palace	مجموعه سعدآباد – Majmue ye Sa’dābād	Tehran	19th century	Museum, Palace	
Safir Office Machines Museum	موزه ماشین‌های اداری سفیر	Tehran	2008	Museum	
Science and Nature Museum of Ahvaz		Ahvaz	2008	Museum	
Silk Road Gallery		Tehran	2001		
Tabātabāei House	خانهٔ طباطبایی‌ها - Khāneh-ye Tabātabāeihā	Kashan	1880	Historical House	
Tabriz Museum of Natural History	موزه تاریخ طبیعی تبریز	Tabriz	1993	Natural History Museum	
Tehran Museum of Contemporary Art	موزه هنرهای معاصر تهران	Tehran	1977	Museum	
Tehran Peace Museum	موزه صلح تهران	Tehran	2011	Museum	
The Iranian National Museum of Medical Sciences History	موزه ملی تاریخ علوم پزشکی ایران	Tehran	2002	Museum	
The Post & Communication Museum of Tehran		Tehran		Museum	
Time Museum of Tehran		Tehran		Museum	
Towhid Prison	زندان کمیته مشترک ضدخرابکاری	Tehran		Prison	
Water Museum		Yazd		Museum	
Zagros Paleolithic Museum	موزه پارینه‌سنگی زاگرس	Kermanshah	2008	Museum	
Narenjestan Traditional House		Yazd		Historical House	
Narenjestan Museum		Shiraz		Museum, Historical House	
Iranian House of Cartoon	خانه کاریکاتور ایران	Tehran	1996	Museum	
Hayk Mirzayans Insect Museum	موزه حشره‌شناسی هایک میرزایانس	Tehran	1945	Museum	
Sazmanab	سازماناب	Tehran	2008	Museum	

== See also ==
- Tourism in Iran
- History of Iran
- Culture of Iran
- List of museums
- List of museums in Tehran
