= Outline of anthropology =

Overview of and topical guide to anthropology

The following outline is provided as an overview of and topical guide to anthropology:

Anthropology – study of humankind. Anthropology has origins in the natural sciences – humanities – and the social sciences. The term was first used by François Péron when discussing his encounters with Aboriginal Tasmanians.

== What type of thing is anthropology? ==
Anthropology can be described as all of the following:

- Academic discipline – body of knowledge given to – or received by – a disciple (student); a branch or sphere of knowledge, or field of study, that an individual has chosen to specialise in.
- Field of science – widely recognized category of specialized expertise within science, and typically embodies its own terminology and nomenclature. Such a field will usually be represented by one or more scientific journals, where peer-reviewed research is published. There are many sociology-related scientific journals.
- Social science – field of academic scholarship that explores aspects of human society.

== History of anthropology ==
History of anthropology

== Fields of anthropology ==
- Archaeology – study of human activity through the recovery and analysis of material culture. The archaeological record consists of artifacts, architecture, biofacts or ecofacts, sites, and cultural landscapes.
- Biological anthropology – concerned with the biological and behavioral aspects of human beings.
- Linguistic anthropology – interdisciplinary study of how language influences social life.
- Sociocultural anthropology – focus on the study of society and culture. Includes Cultural anthropology and Social anthropology.

=== Archaeological subfields of anthropology ===
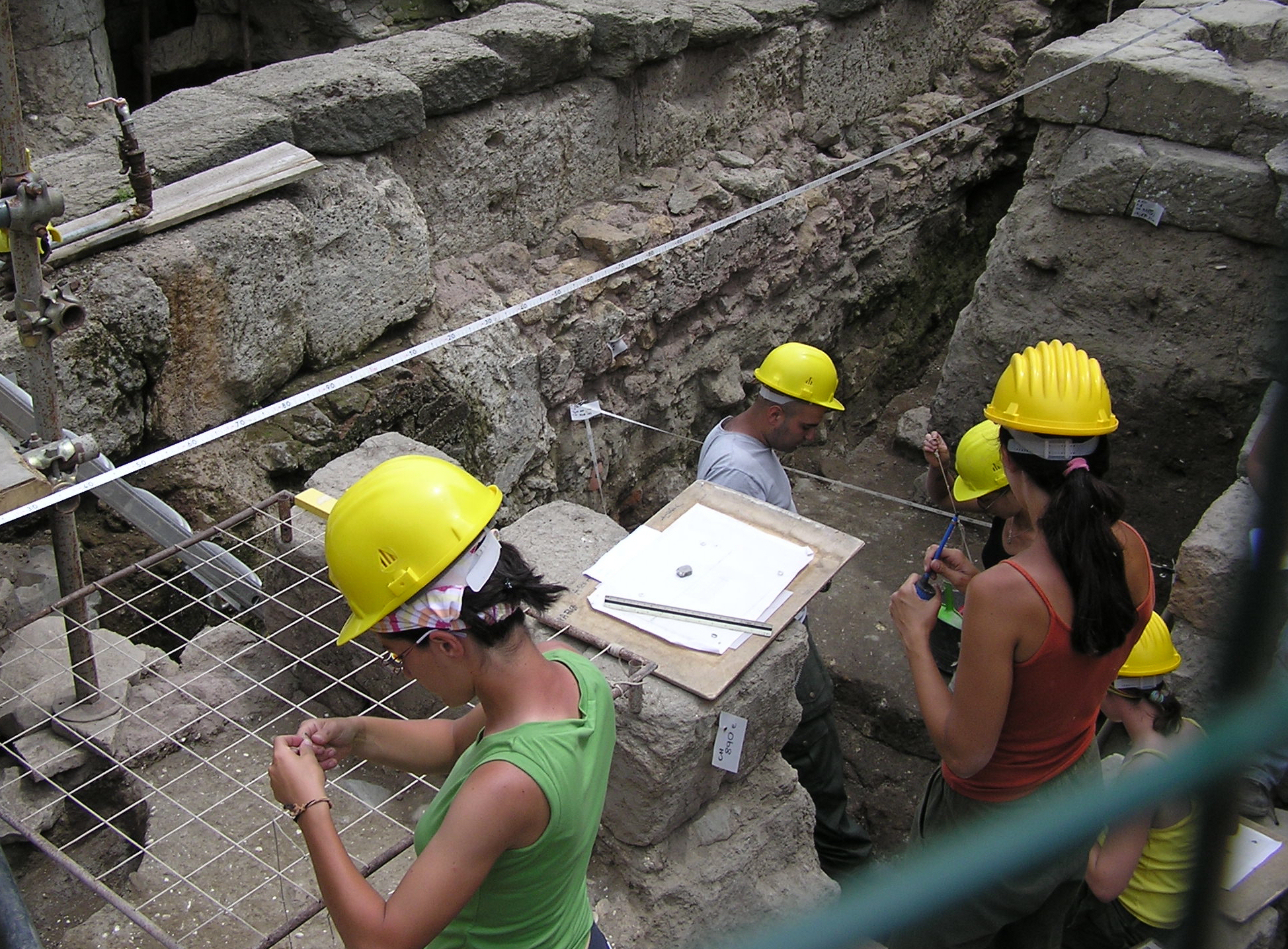
An archaeological site in Rome, Italy

- Biocultural anthropology – scientific exploration of the relationships between human biology and culture.
- Feminist archaeology – interprets past societies from a feminist perspective.
- Maritime archaeology – studies human interaction with the sea, lakes and rivers through the study of associated physical remains, be they vessels, shore-side facilities, port-related structures, cargoes, human remains and submerged landscapes.

=== Biological subfields of anthropology ===
- Anthrozoology – subset of ethnobiology that deals with interactions between humans and other animals, such as quantifying the positive effects of human–animal relationships.
- Evolutionary anthropology – interdisciplinary study of the evolution of human physiology and human behavior, and of the relation between hominids and non-hominid primates.
- Forensic anthropology – application of the anatomical science of anthropology and its various subfields, including forensic archaeology and forensic taphonomy, in a legal setting.
- Paleoanthropology – study of the evolutionary development of ancient humans.

=== Linguistic subfields of anthropology ===
- Linguistic anthropology – interdisciplinary study of how language influences social life
- Linguistic description –
- Ethnolinguistics –
- Historical linguistics –
- Semiotic anthropology – approach to semantics
- Sociolinguistics –

=== Socio-cultural anthropology subfields ===
- Applied anthropology – application of the method and theory of anthropology to the analysis and solution of practical problems
- Anthropology of art –
- Cognitive anthropology – concerned with what people from different groups know and how that implicit knowledge, in the sense of what they think subconsciously, changes the way people perceive and relate to the world around them
- Communication studies –
- Cultural studies –
- Digital anthropology – study of the relationship between humans and digital-era technology
- Anthropology of development –
- Ecological anthropology –
- Economic anthropology –
- Historical anthropology –
- Anthropology of gender & sexuality –
- Kinship & family –
- Legal anthropology –
- Media anthropology –
- Medical anthropology –
- Political anthropology –
- Psychological anthropology – studies the interaction of cultural and mental processes
- Public anthropology –
- Anthropology of religion –
- Transpersonal anthropology – studies the relationship between altered states of consciousness and culture
- Urban anthropology – concerned with issues of urbanization, poverty, and neoliberalism
- Visual anthropology – study and production of ethnographic photography

=== Other subfields ===
- Anthropological criminology – a combination of the study of the human species and the study of criminals
- Anthropological linguistics – study of the relations between language and culture and the relations between human biology, cognition and language
- Anthropological theories of value – theories that attempt to expand on the traditional theories of value used by economists or ethicists
- Cyborg anthropology – studies the interaction between humanity and technology from an anthropological perspective
- Museum anthropology – domain that cross-cuts anthropology's sub-fields
- Philosophical anthropology – dealing with questions of metaphysics and phenomenology of the human person
- Theological anthropology – study of the human as it relates to God

== General anthropology concepts ==
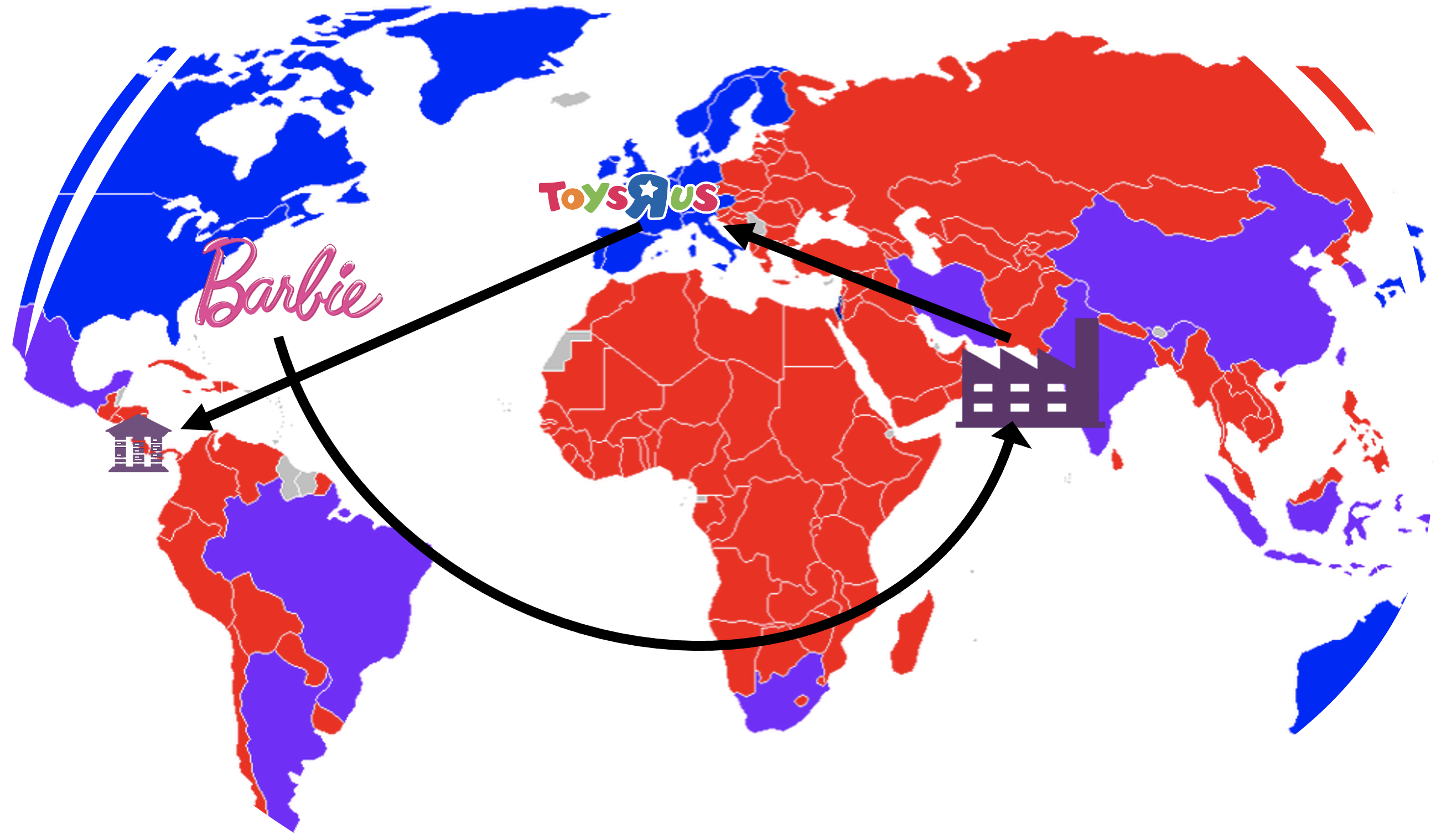
A diagram of globalization

- Anthropological theories of value
- Culture (outline)
- Society (outline)
- Kinship and descent
- Marriage and family
- Evolution (outline)
- Material culture
- Race and ethnicity
- Globalization and postcolonialism
- Socialization
- Uncontacted peoples

== Theories ==
Intellectual genealogy of theories about cultural dimensions

- Actor–network theory – theoretical and methodological approach to social theory where everything in the social and natural worlds exists in constantly shifting networks of relationships. It posits that nothing exists outside those relationships.
- Alliance theory –
- Cross-cultural studies –
- Cultural materialism –
- Culture theory –
- Feminism –
- Structural functionalism –
- Symbolic anthropology –
- Performance studies –
- Political economy –
- Practice theory –
- Structuralism –
- Post-structuralism –
- Systems theory

== Methods and frameworks ==
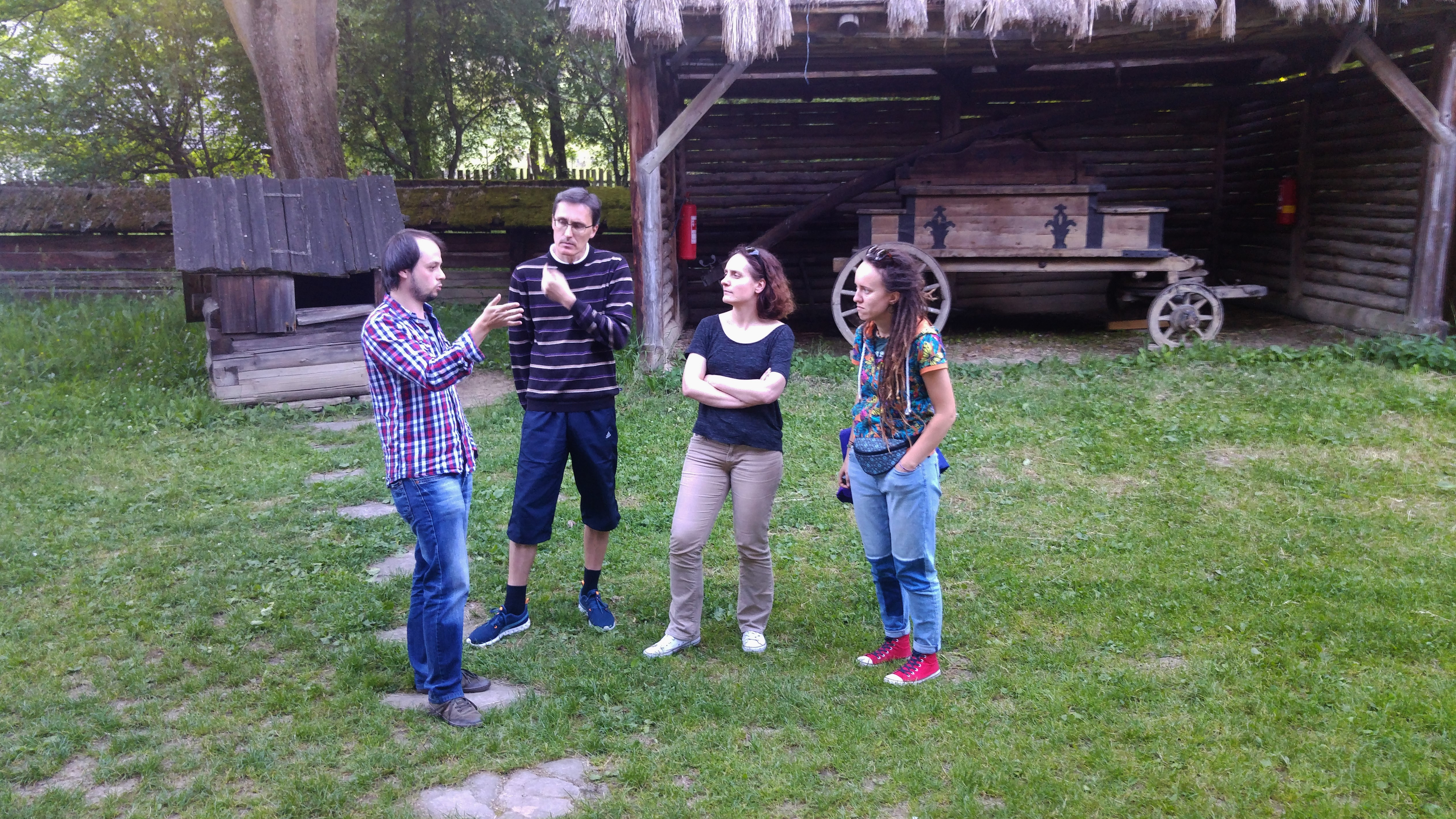
Ethnographers in Slovakia

- Ethnography
- Ethnology
- Cross-cultural comparison
- Participant observation
- Online ethnography
- Holism
- Reflexivity
- Thick description
- Cultural relativism
- Ethnocentrism
- Emic and etic

== Anthropology organizations ==
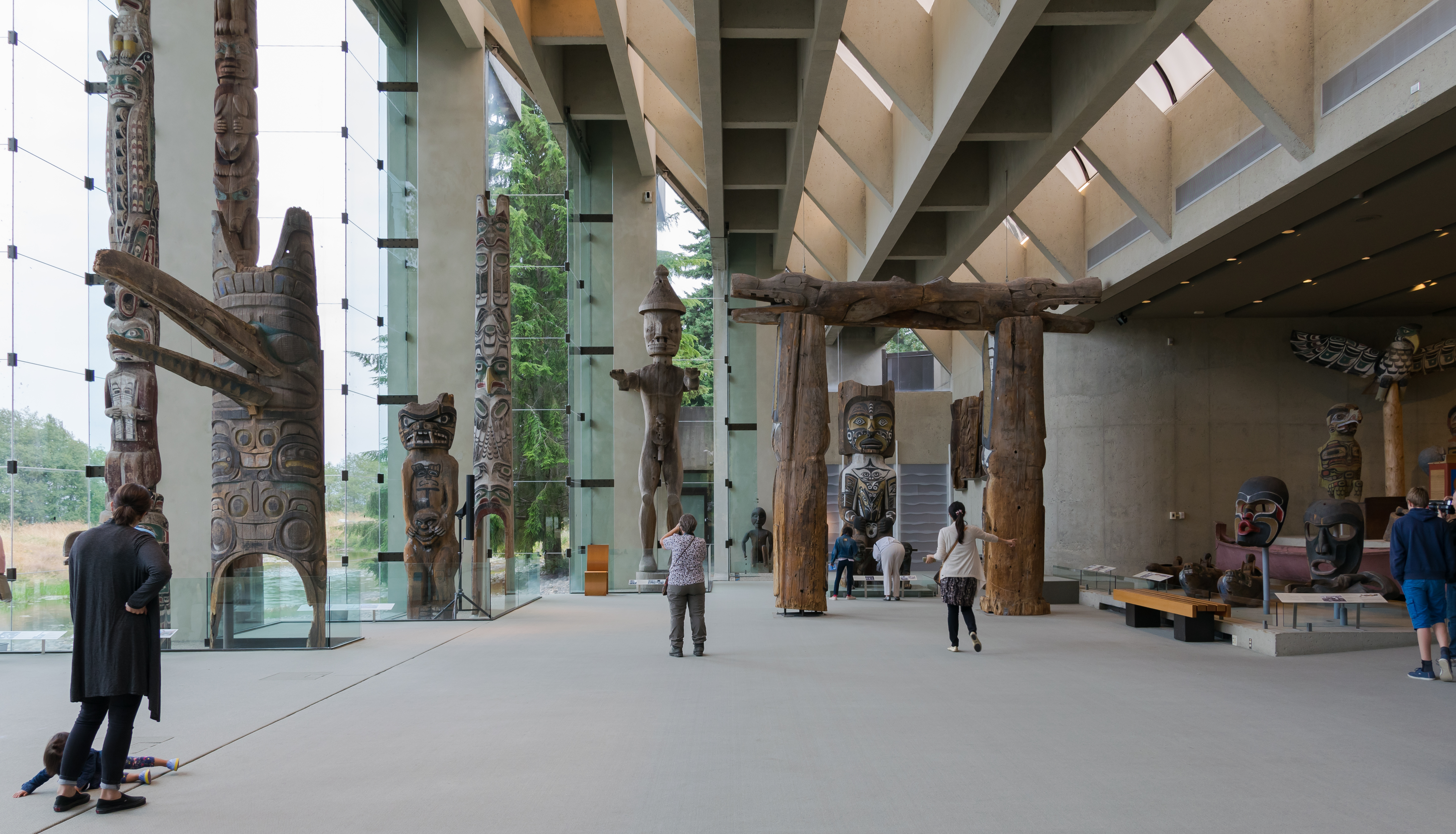
The Museum of Anthropology at the University of British Columbia in Canada

- American Anthropological Association – professional organization of scholars and practitioners in the field of anthropology
- American Association of Physical Anthropologists – based in the United States
- American Ethnological Society
- Anthropological Society of London – short-lived organisation of the 1860s whose founders aimed to furnish scientific evidence for white supremacy which they construed in terms of polygenism.
- Anthropological Society of Victoria – formed in 1934
- Anthropological Survey of India – apex Indian organisation involved in anthropological studies and field data research
- Ardabil Anthropology Museum – a museum in Ardabil, Iran
- Australian Anthropological Society – professional association representing anthropologists in Australia
- Center for World Indigenous Studies
- Ethnological Society of London
- Indian Anthropological Society – representative body of the professional anthropologists in India
- Institute of Anthropology and Ethnography – Russian institute of research, specializing in ethnographic studies of cultural and physical anthropology
- Max Planck Institute for Evolutionary Anthropology – research institute based in Leipzig
- Maxwell Museum of Anthropology – anthropology museum located on the University of New Mexico campus
- Museum of Archaeology and Anthropology, University of Cambridge – university's collections of local antiquities, together with archaeological and ethnographic artefacts from around the world
- National Anthropological Archives – archive maintained by the Smithsonian Institution
- Network of Concerned Anthropologists
- N. N. Miklukho-Maklai Institute of Ethnology and Anthropology
- Princess Maha Chakri Sirindhorn Anthropology Centre – academic institution in Thailand
- Royal Anthropological Institute of Great Britain and Ireland – long-established anthropological organisation
- Society for Anthropological Sciences
- Society for Applied Anthropology
- Society for Medical Anthropology – organization formed to promote study of anthropological aspects of health, illness, health care, and related topics
- South Carolina Institute of Archaeology and Anthropology – University of South Carolina research institute
- USC Center for Visual Anthropology – center located at the University of Southern California

== Books, journals, and other literature ==
- Bibliography of anthropology
- List of anthropology journals

== Anthropology scholars ==
- American
  - Franz Boas
  - Ruth Benedict
  - Margaret Mead
  - Eric Wolf
- British
  - Bronislaw Malinowski
  - E.E. Evans-Pritchard
  - Alfred Radcliffe-Brown
  - Edmund Leach
- French
  - Marcel Mauss
  - Claude Lévi-Strauss

== Anthropology lists ==
- List of members of the National Academy of Sciences (Anthropology)
- List of museums with major collections in ethnography and anthropology
- List of visual anthropology films

== See also ==
- Anthropological Index Online (AIO)
- Intangible Cultural Heritage

Related fields

- Ethnology
- Folklore
- Outline of archaeology
- Outline of linguistics
- Philosophical anthropology – which is not part of anthropology but a subfield of philosophy
- Sociology (outline)
- Theological anthropology – which is not part of anthropology but a subfield of theology
- Periodic Table of Human Sciences / Anthropology in Tinbergen's four questions
