= Tabriz Vocational Museum =

Museum in Tabriz, Iran

- Təbriz Peşə Muzeyi (Azerbaijani)
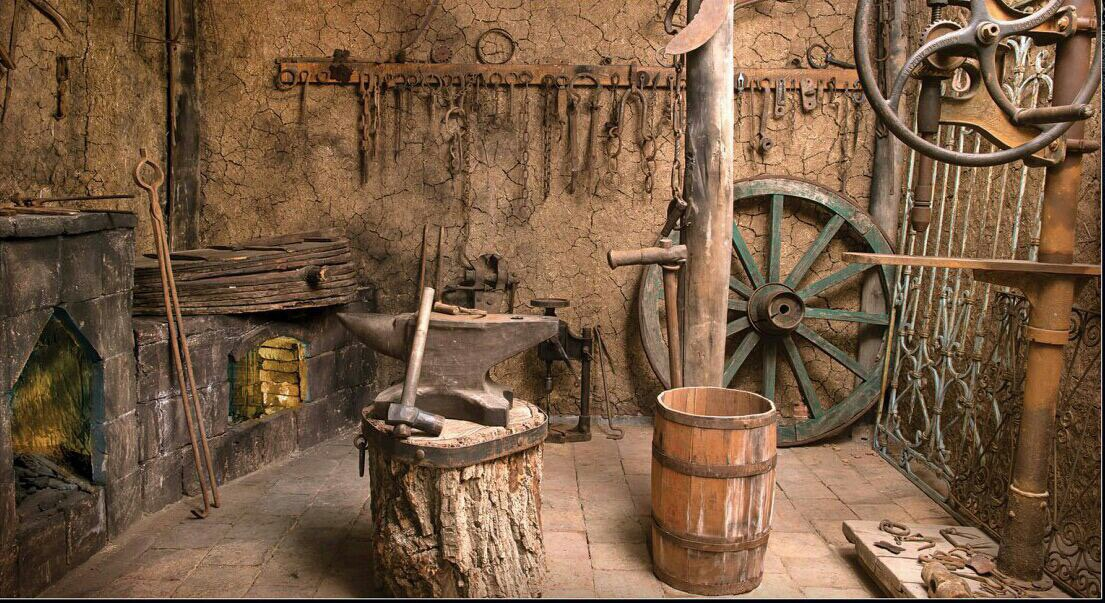
- Established: 11 May 2017
- Dissolved: 18 May 2020
- Location: Tabriz
- Founder: Reza Sarabi Agdam

Tabriz Vocational Museum is a museum established in 2017 with the initiative of Tabrizian sculptor, writer and collector Reza Sarabi Agdam and demonstrates the historical professions of Azerbaijan. After three active years, the museum was closed on May 18, 2020, on International Museum Day due to financial problems caused by lack of Tabriz Municipality's support leading into public anger and dissatisfaction.

== Description ==
Tabriz Vocational Museum was established by the efforts of a sculptor, writer and collector named Reza Sarabi Agdam. The opening of the museum took place on May 11, 2017. The museum has exhibits reflecting the historical professions of Azerbaijan. Other exhibits include Thomas Edison's flashlight, an unparalleled collection of lanterns in the Middle East, a Timurid Koran, a map of the Gajar and Tsarist frontiers after the Turkmenchay Treaty, items from the Nazi German embassy, and weapons from various historical periods.

== Closing of the museum ==
For its first three years, the museum operated free of charge. According to founder Reza Sarabi Agdam, the institution received limited official support despite repeated discussions with local authorities. Although he reportedly received offers from foreign buyers and other cities in Iran to acquire parts of the collection, he declined them. In 2020, after disputes over municipal support and funding commitments, the museum’s exhibits were removed, and the museum closed on 18 May 2020, coinciding with International Museum Day. The closure received public attention and criticism locally.

== Gallery ==
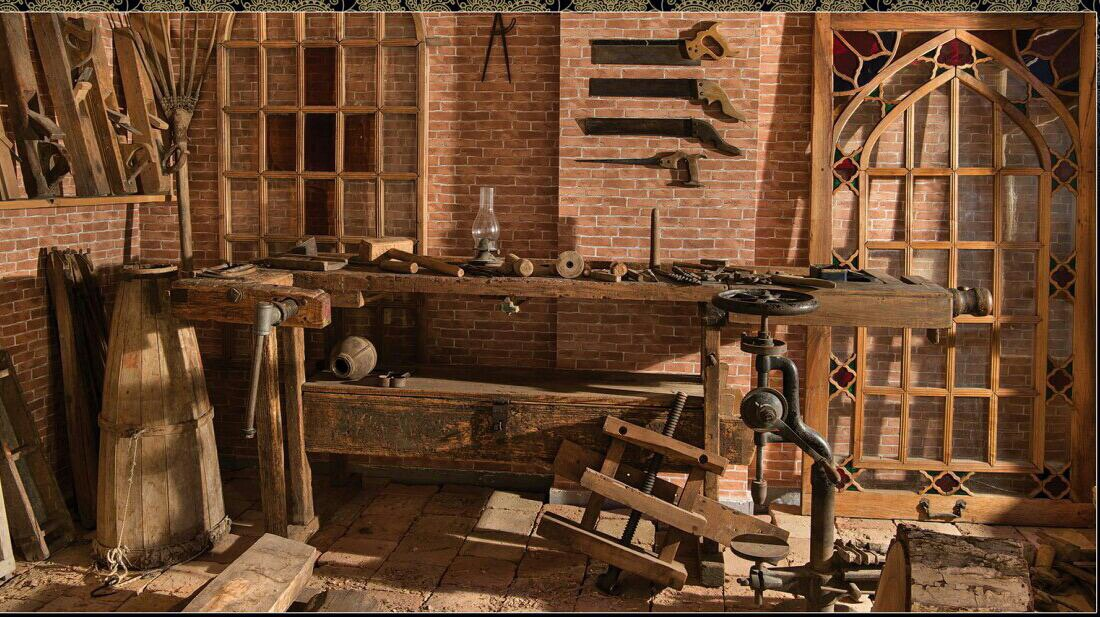

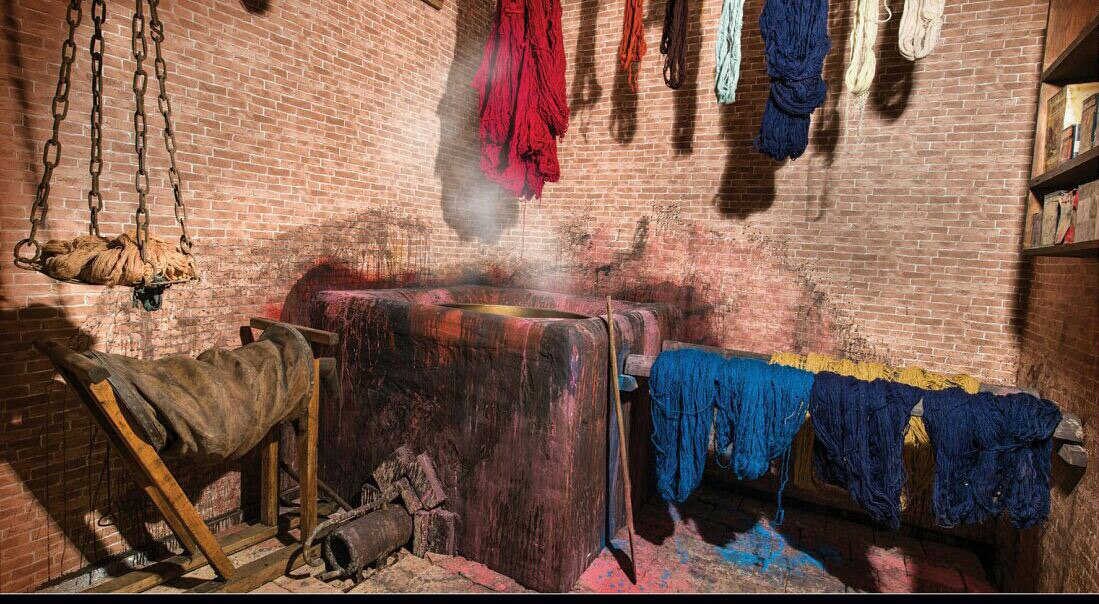

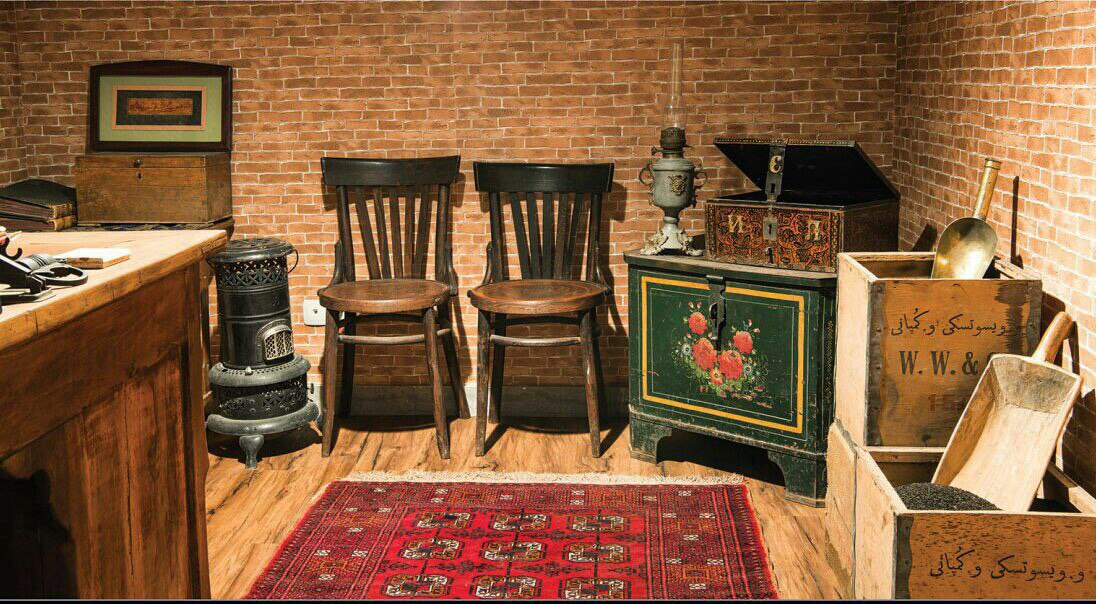

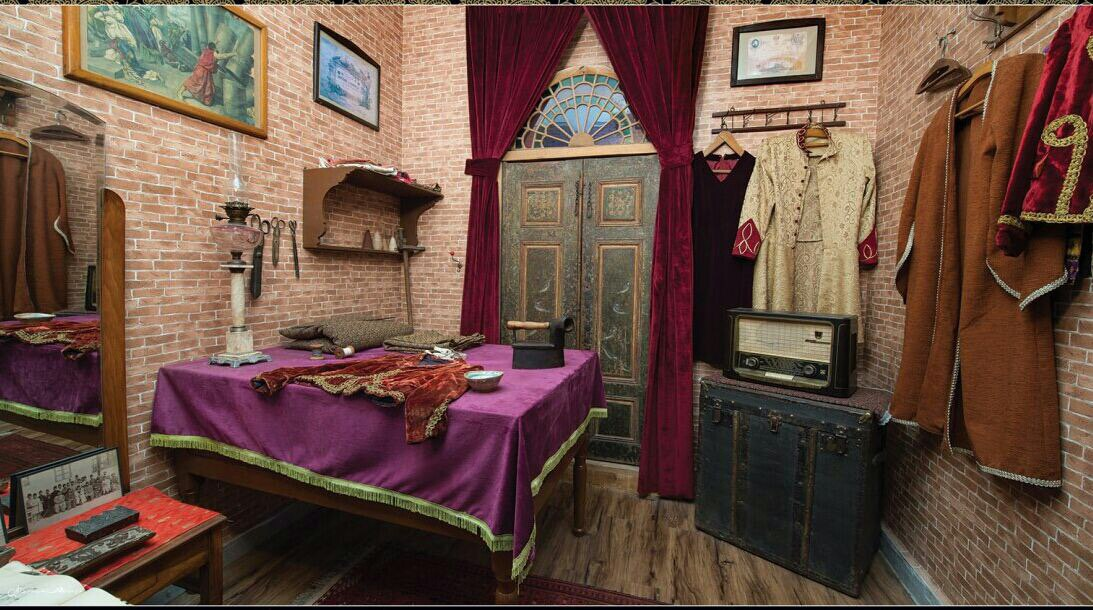

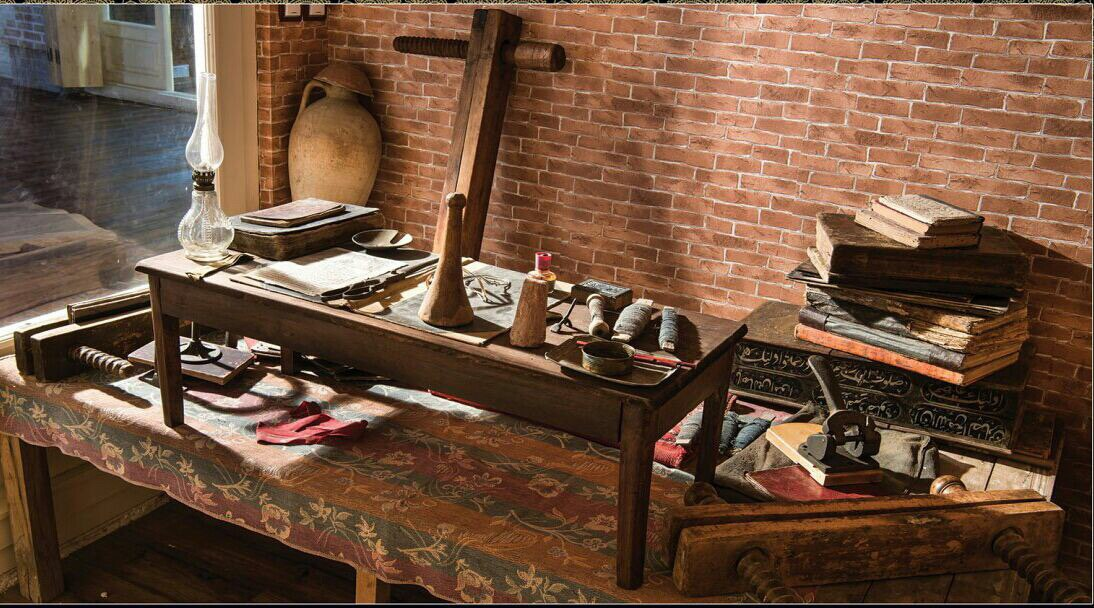

== See also ==
- Hariree House
- Measure Museum
- Constitution House of Tabriz
