= Ferdowsi Street, Tabriz =

Street in Tabriz, Iran

Coordinates: 38°04′31″N 46°17′24″E

Ferdowsi Street (Persian: خیابان فردوسی) is a street in downtown of Tabriz, Iran, connecting Bazaar Alley to Imam Avenue in the vicinity of Arg. It is well known for its historical architecture, hostels, and shops. It is located in the Bazaar suburb. The street is including numerous shops for industrial tools.

== See also ==
- Tarbiyat street
- Shahnaz street
