= Hariree House =

Historic house in Tabriz, Iran

Hariri House
- Azerbaijani: Həriri evi
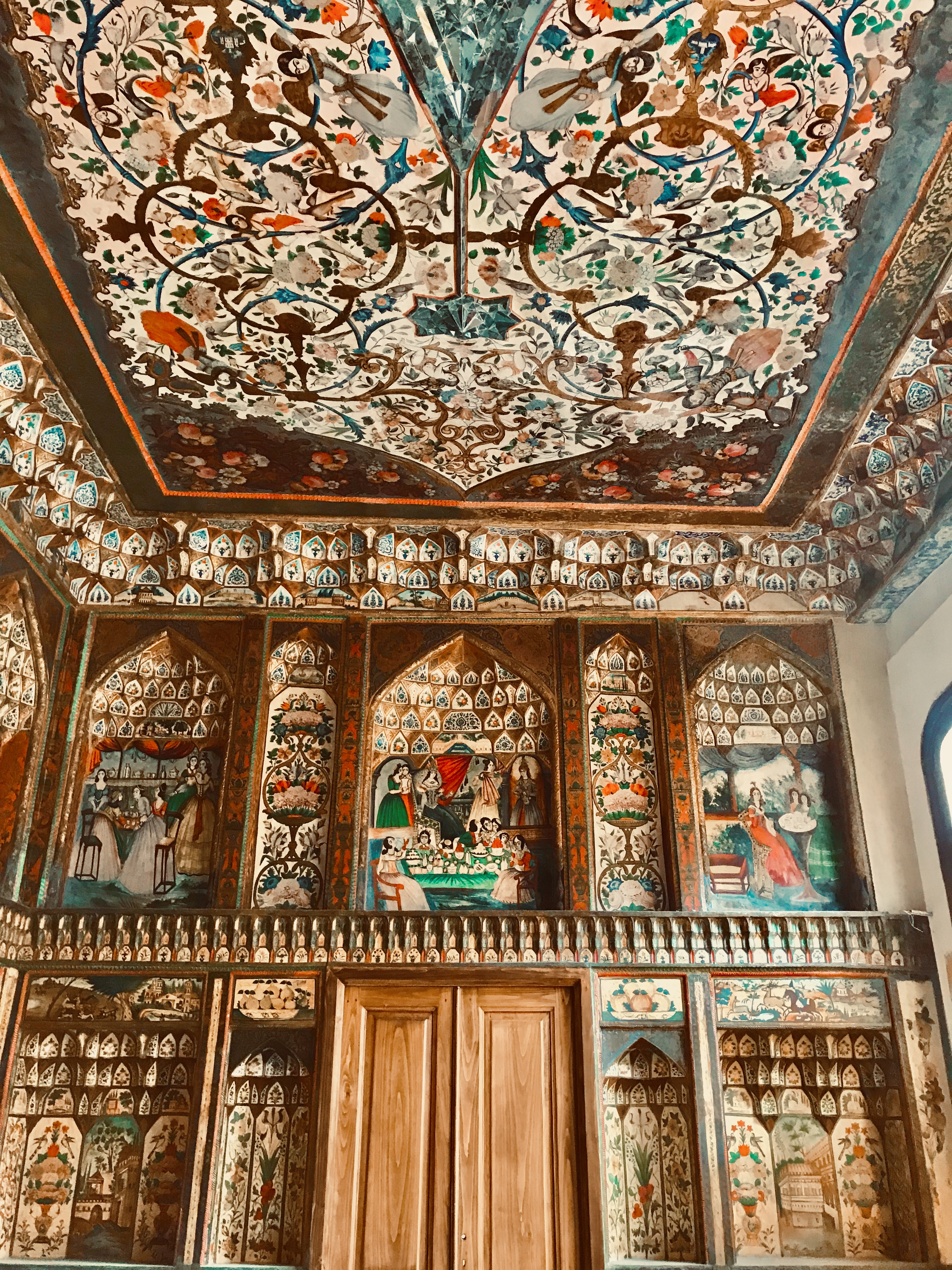

General information
- Architectural style: Qajar style
- Location: Tarbiat street, Tabriz, Iran

Dr. Hariri's house (Azerbaijani: Həriri evi, Persian: خانه حریری) is a 19th century Qajar era house built on Tarbiat street in Tabriz, Iran. It has been added to the list of national heritage due to its beautiful architectural features. The Iranian Azerbaijan Press Museum has been operating in the building since 2017.

== About ==
Hariri's house was built in the 19th century in Tabriz. The building dates back to the Qajar era, and consists of two blocks facing the qibla, with both an inner and an outer courtyard. Numerous paintings, various designs and colours on the walls makes Dr. Hariri's house different from other old houses in Tabriz. The rooms of Hariri's house are decorated with unique wall paintings. The building was registered as a national monument on 17 January 1999.

=== Press Museum ===
The "Azerbaijan Press Museum" has been operating on the first floor of the building since 2017. Although the decision to establish the museum was made five years ago, the museum opened in August 2017. At the opening ceremony, the head of the East Azerbaijan Islamic Guidance and Culture Department, Mohammad Mohammadpur, called Azerbaijan a leading region of the country's media. He later said:

The Azerbaijani press, which has a deep and broad history, needed a museum. Examples of the history of the Azerbaijani press can be seen dispersed at various institutions, bodies and people. However, they must be collected and kept in this museum. In this case, foreign and domestic tourists visiting the museum can get acquainted with the cultural history of East Azerbaijan.

== Photos ==
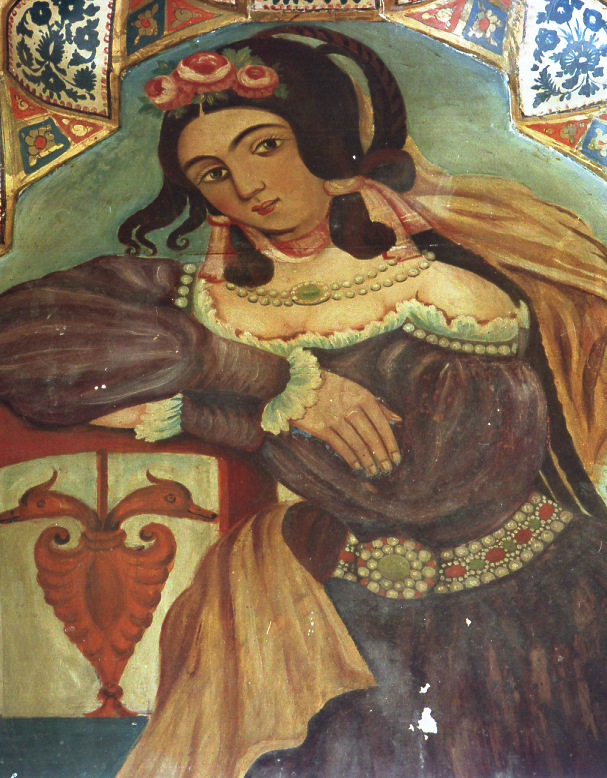
Painting in a niche

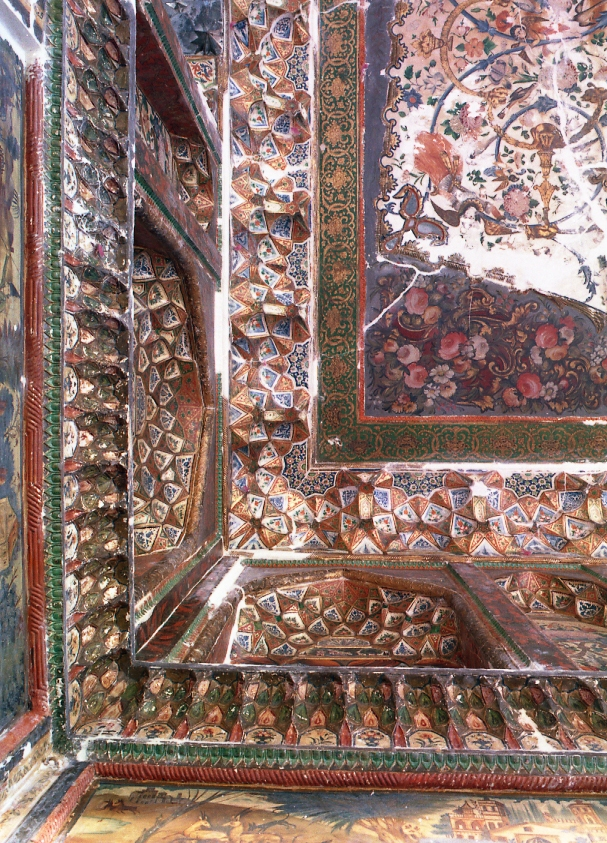
Ceiling with muqarnas decorations

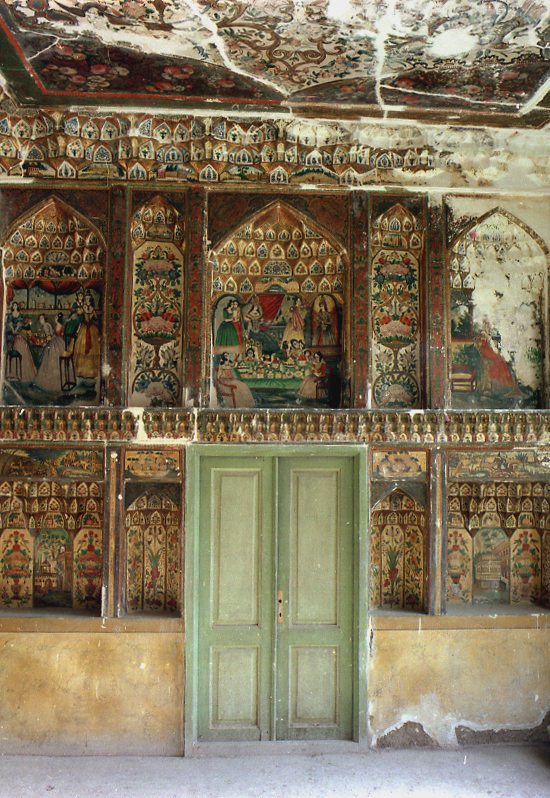
A door

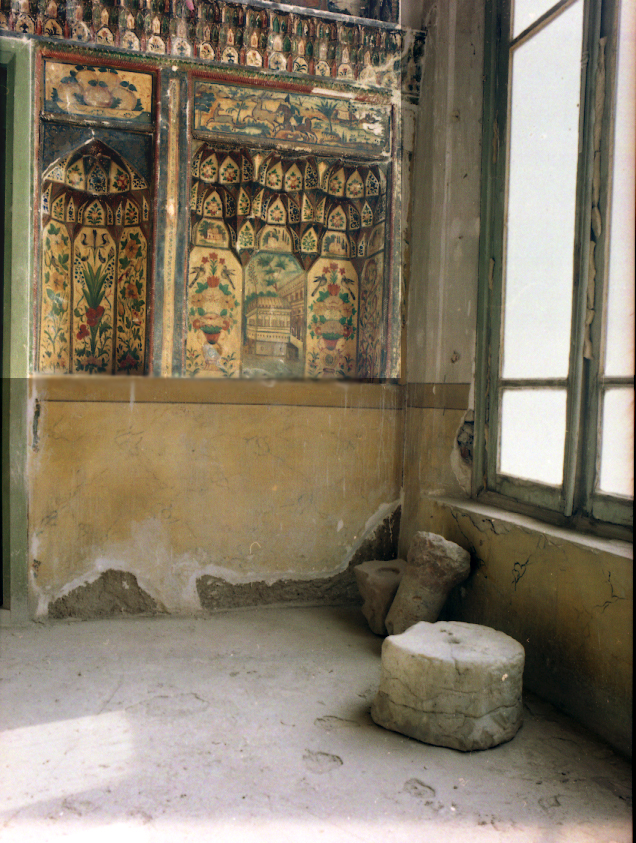
The southeast corner of a room

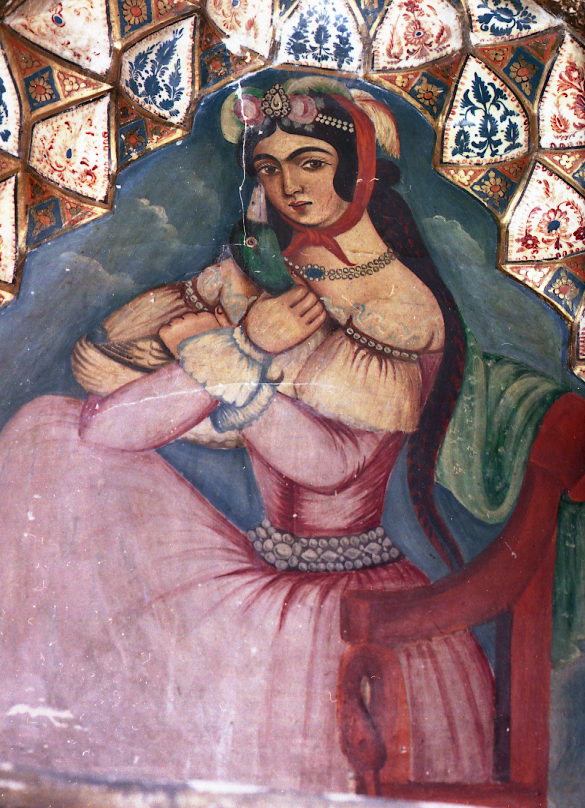
Painting in a niche

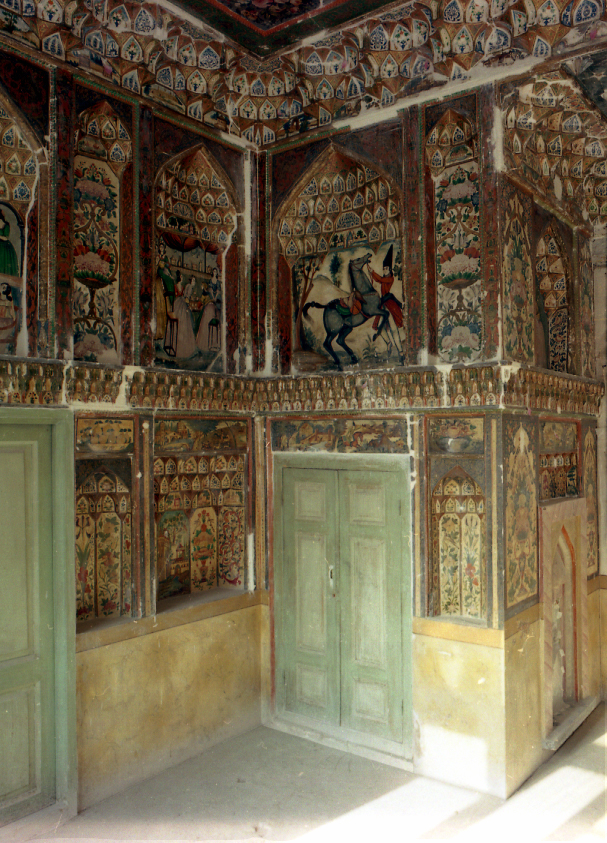
A corner

== See also ==
- Nobar bath
- Shahnaz street
