= Measure Museum =

Museum in Tabriz, Iran

Coordinates: 38°04′23″N 46°17′44″E

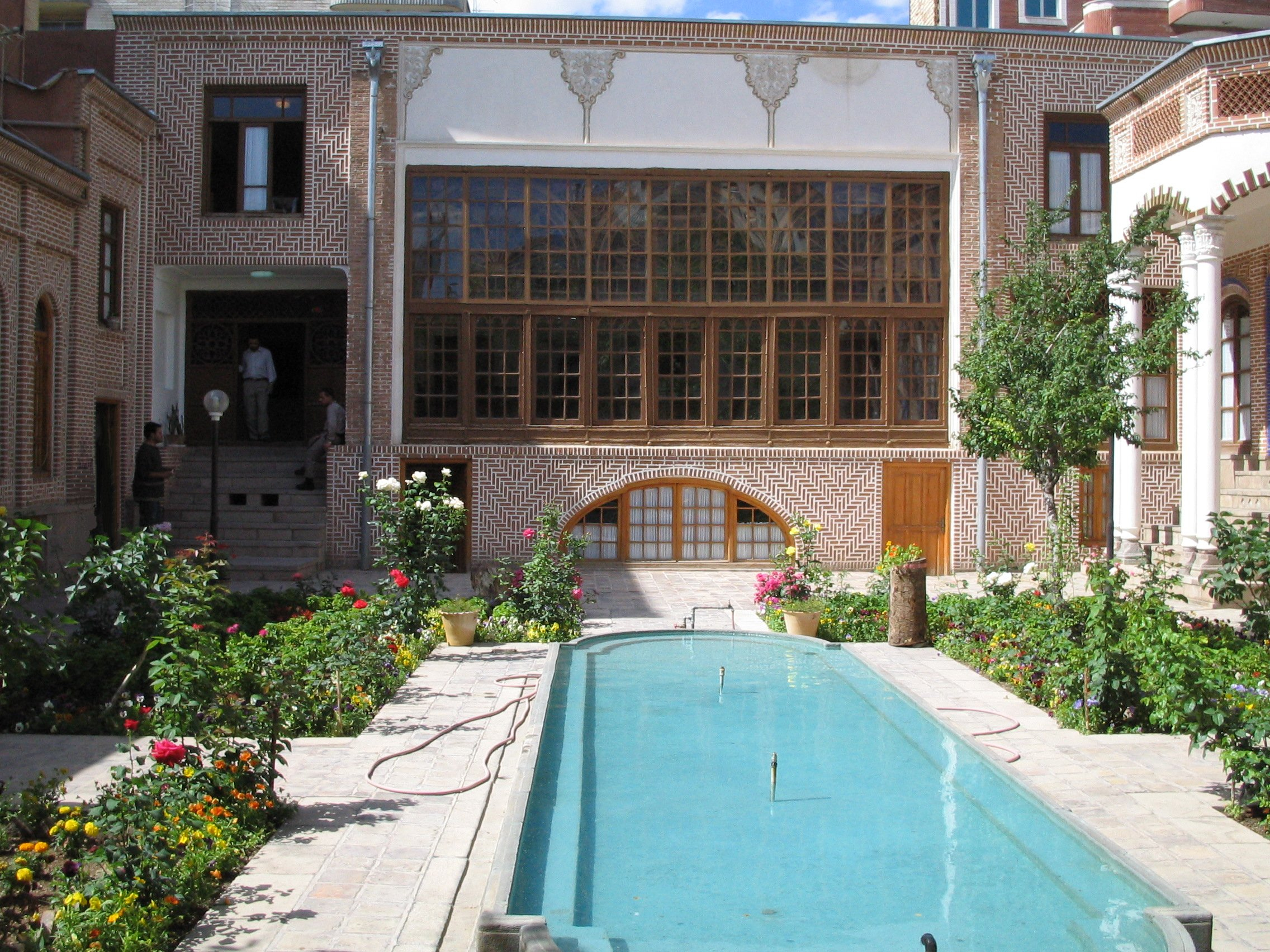
- Location: Tabriz, Iran

The Measure Museum (Persian: موزه سنجش) of Tabriz is located in the Salmasi House.

The museum has a variety of weighing tools such as goldsmith scales, large scales for field vegetables, the balance weights, oil modules, astronomical instrument-like astrolabes, meteorology-related assessment tools, compasses and watches from past centuries, and a 5-million-year-old tree belonging to the Pliocene.

== Gallery ==
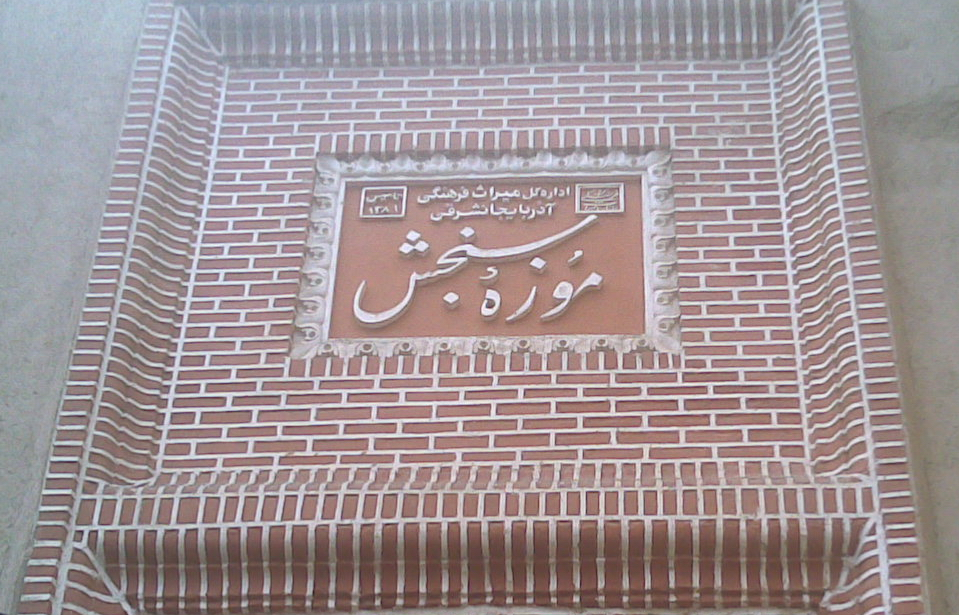

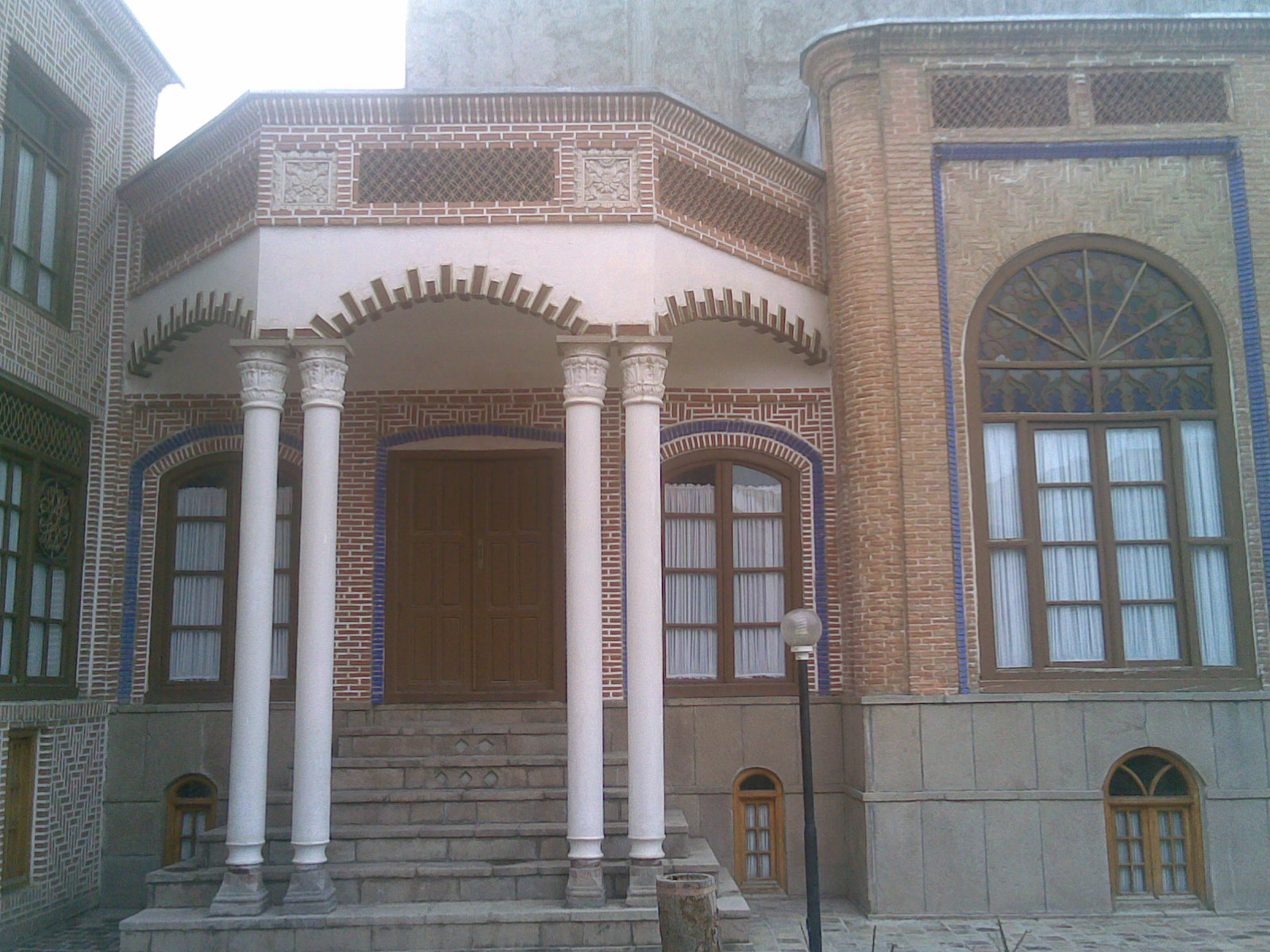

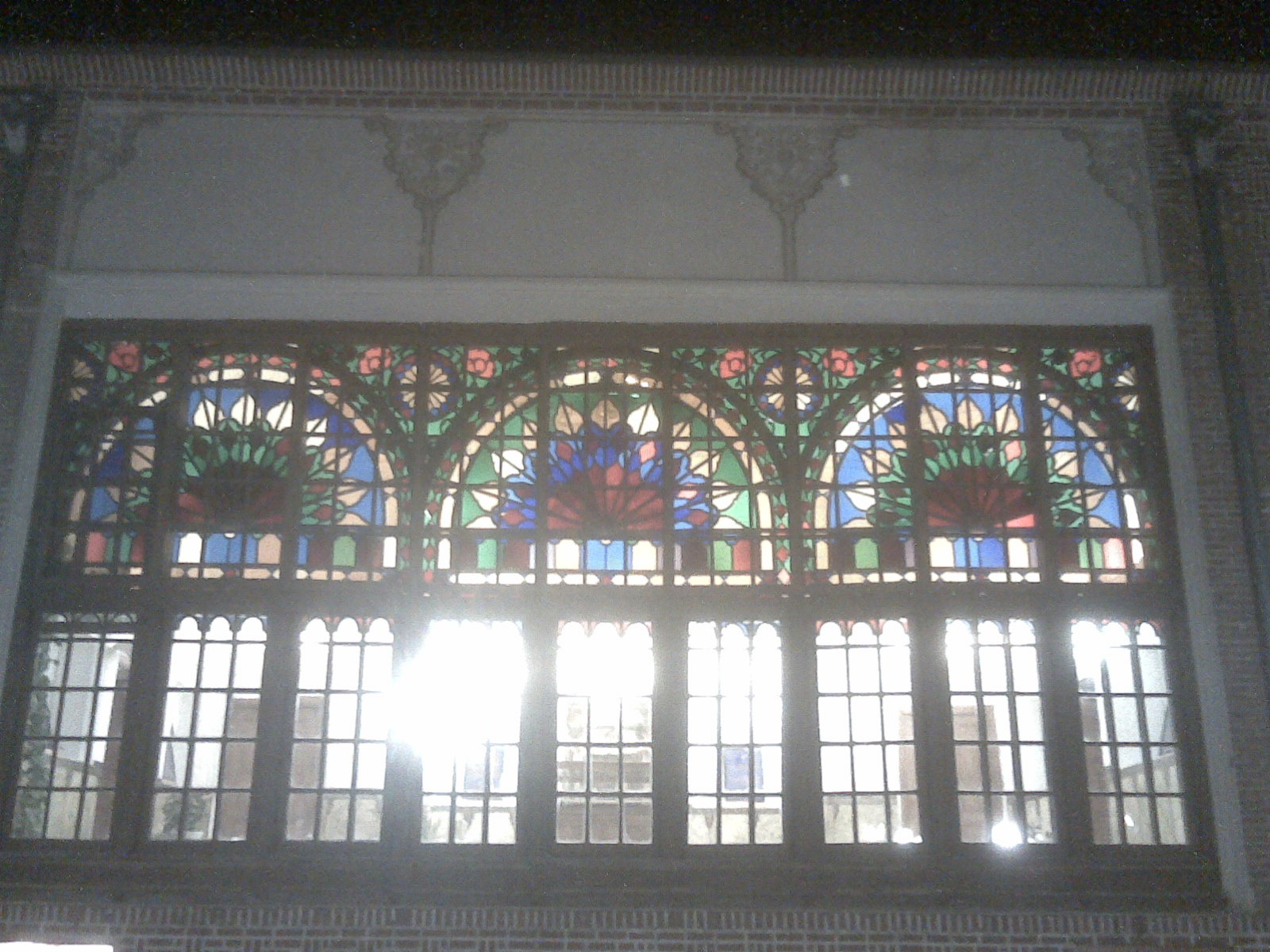

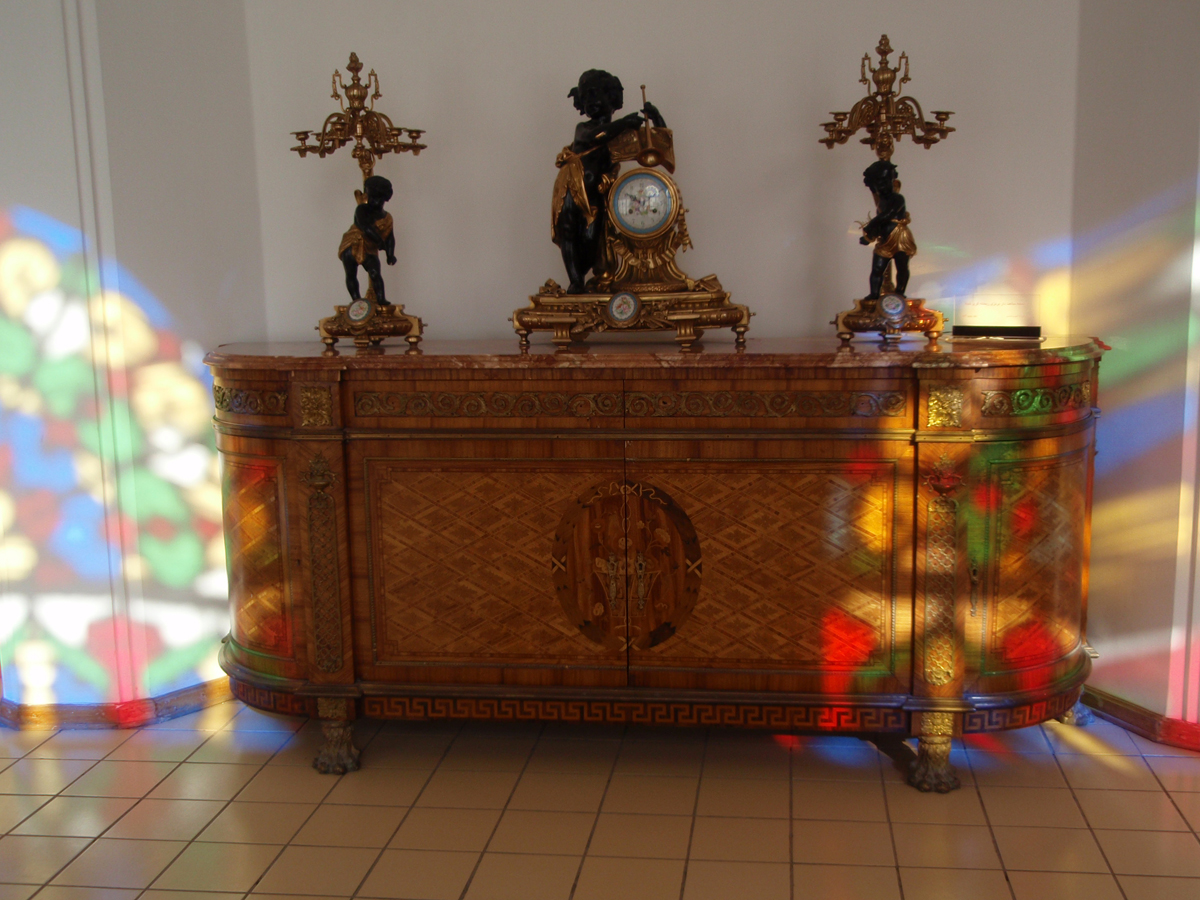

== See also ==
- Nobar Bathhouse
- Ferdowsi Street
- Shahnaz street
