= Khosro Abad Mansion =

Museum and Iranian national heritage site in Kurdistan province

- عمارت خسروآباد
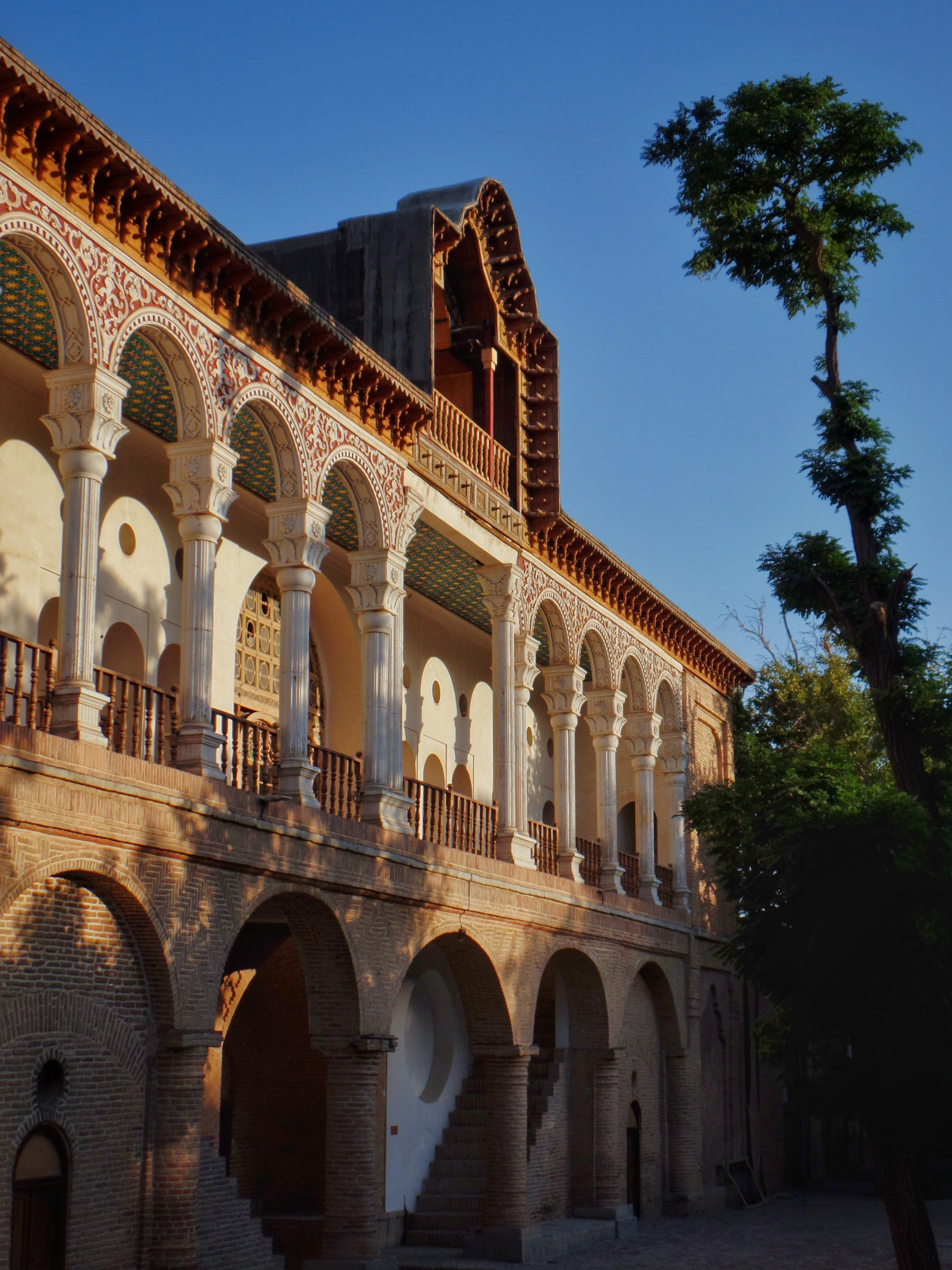
- View of the courtyard and the west facade
- Alternative names: Khosro Abad Museum

General information
- Status: Intact
- Type: Mansion and museum
- Architectural style: Qajar
- Location: Sanandaj, Kurdistan province, Iran
- Coordinates: 35°18′55″N 46°59′02″E
- Year built: 1808 CE

Technical details
- Material: Stucco; bricks

Iran National Heritage List
- Official name: Khosro Abad Mansion
- Type: Built
- Designated: 17 January 1977
- Reference no.: 1491
- Conservation organization: Cultural Heritage, Handicrafts and Tourism Organization of Iran

The Khosro Abad Mansion (Persian: عمارت خسروآباد) or the Khosro Abad Museum is Qajar era mansion and museum, located in Sanandaj, Kurdistan province, Iran. It was awarded the UNESCO seal of authenticity, and was added to the Iran National Heritage List on 17 January 1977, administered by the Cultural Heritage, Handicrafts and Tourism Organization of Iran.

== History and architecture ==
The Khosro Abad mansion was built in 1808 CE by the order of Amanollah Khan Ardalan, the then ruler of Ardalan. Amanollah Khan was the son of Khosro Khan, after whom the mansion is named. During the Qajar era, the mansion served as a government seat and a venue for celebrations. Notably, the wedding ceremony between Fath-Ali Shah's daughter and Amanollah Khan's son was held in the courtyard of this mansion.

The mansion incoperates Qajar era architectural styles, both the east and west facades feature the distinct Qajar style, as demonstrated by their semicircular arches and intricate stucco work. Restoration operations of the building began in 1953–54, although most of the repairing and restoring was done in 1959–60.

== Gallery ==
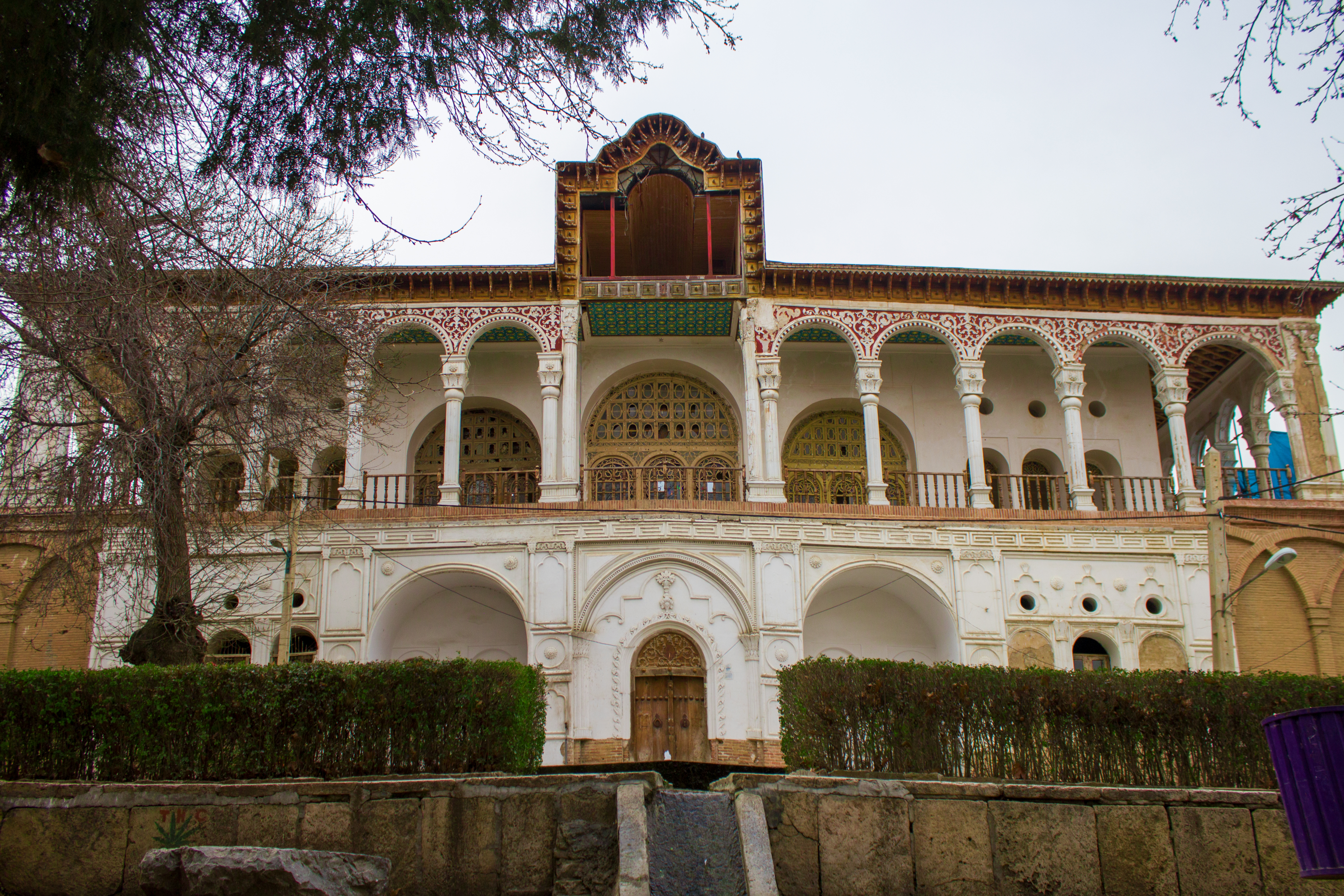
The east facade

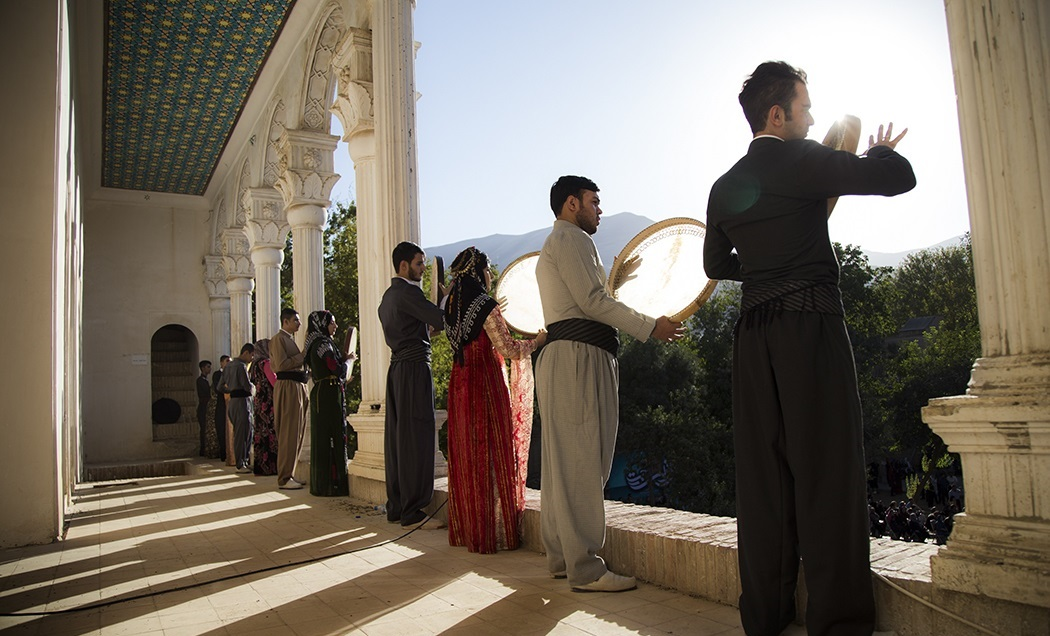
Kurds playing tambourine

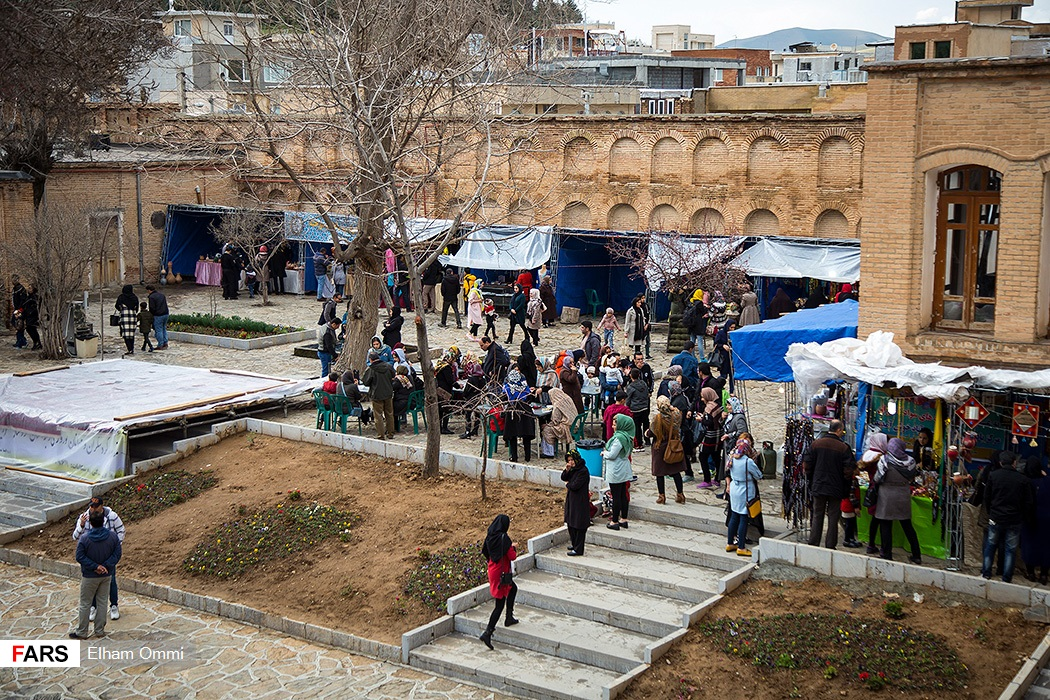
Tourists visiting during Nowruz

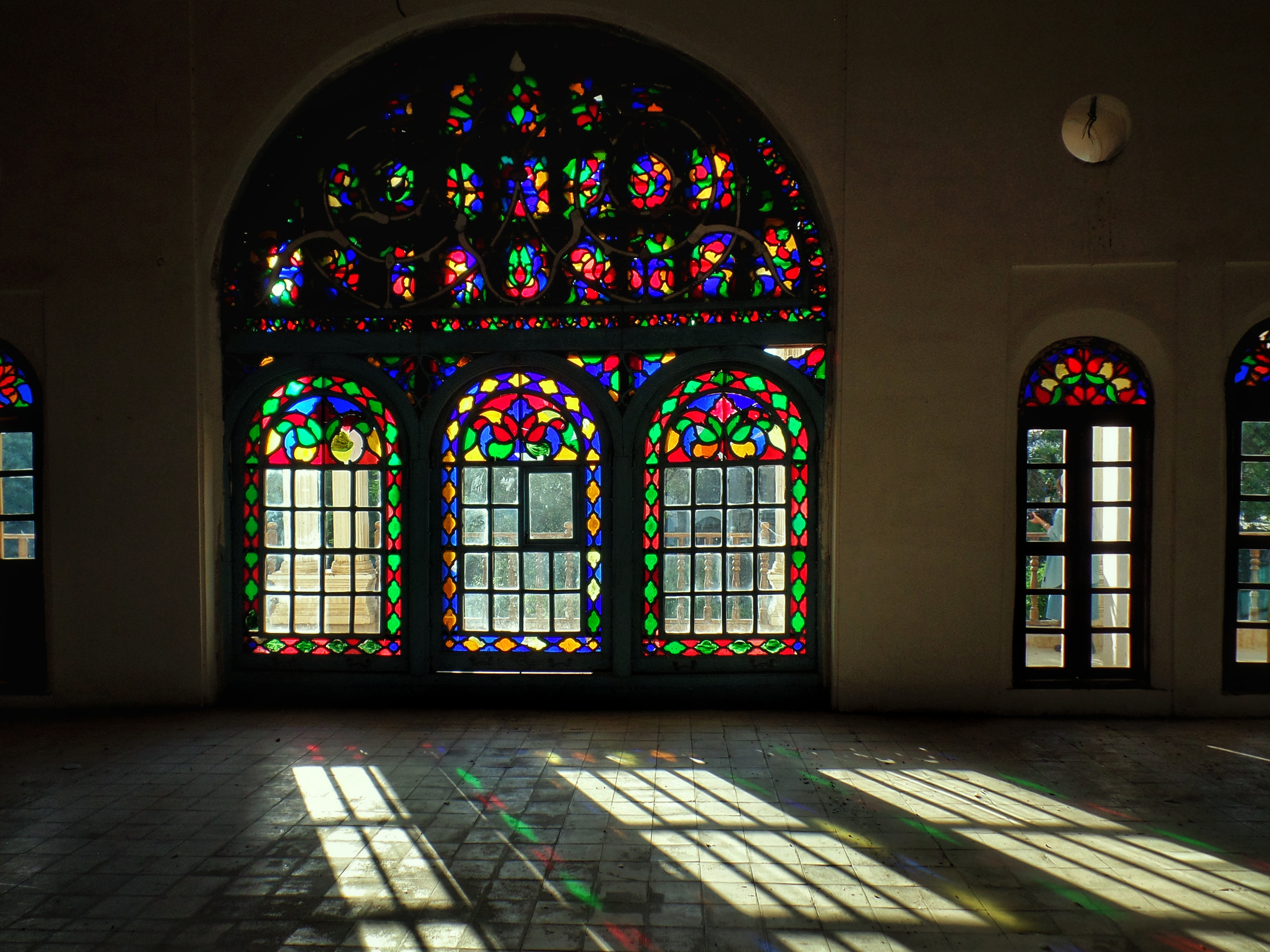
Colored sash windows

== See also ==
- List of museums in Iran
- Khan Bathhouse, Sanandaj
