= Tarbiat street =

Street in Tabriz, Iran

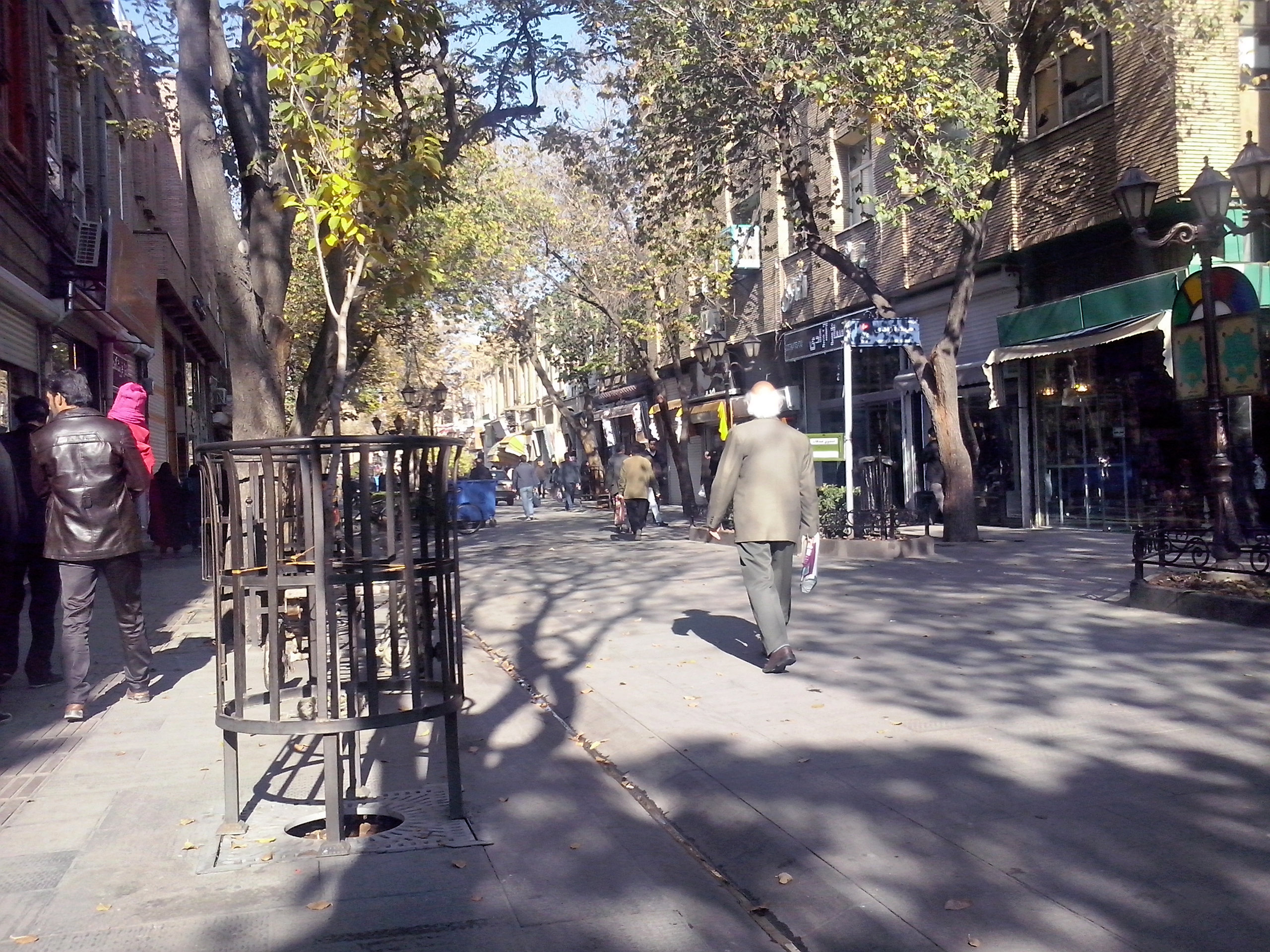
- Interactive map of Tarbiat street
- Location: Tabriz, Iran

Tarbiat street (Persian: خیابان تربیت) is a pedestrian street in the center of Tabriz, Iran. During Mayor Darvish Zadeh's incumbency (1993–1997), Tarbiyat St. was rebuilt as a pedestrian-only street.

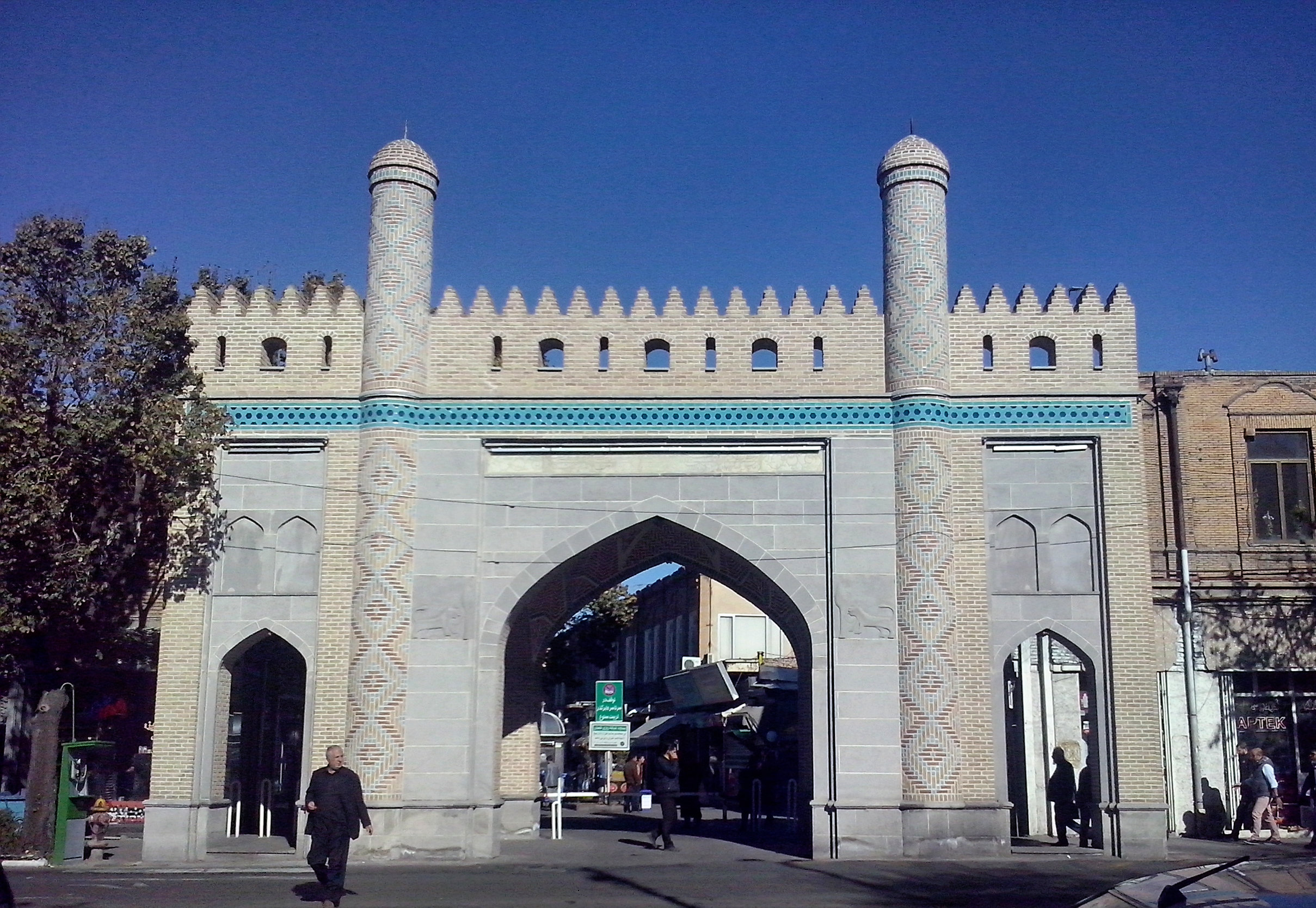
Darb Nobar, one of Tabriz city gates in front of Tarbiat St.

== Gallery ==
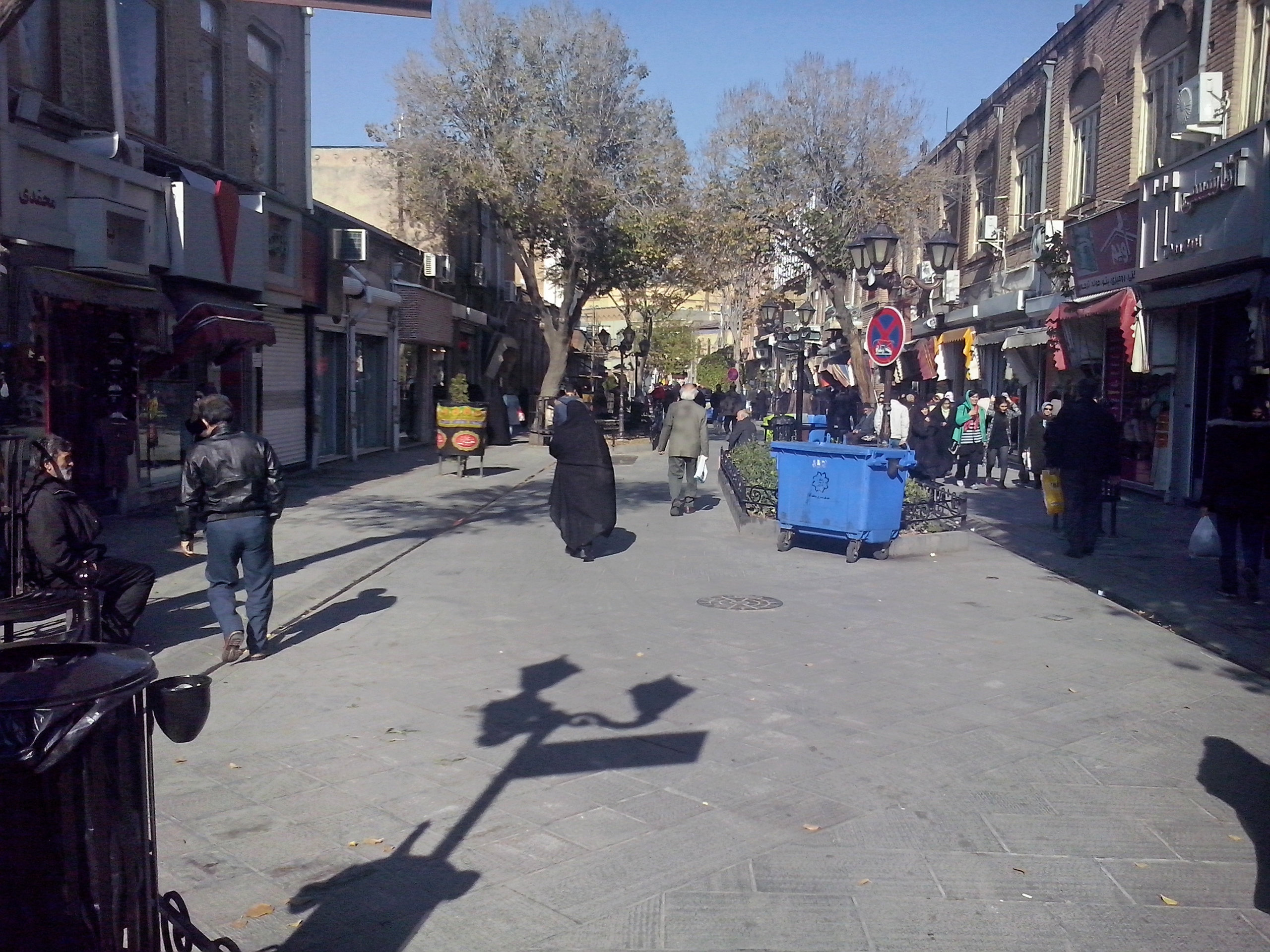

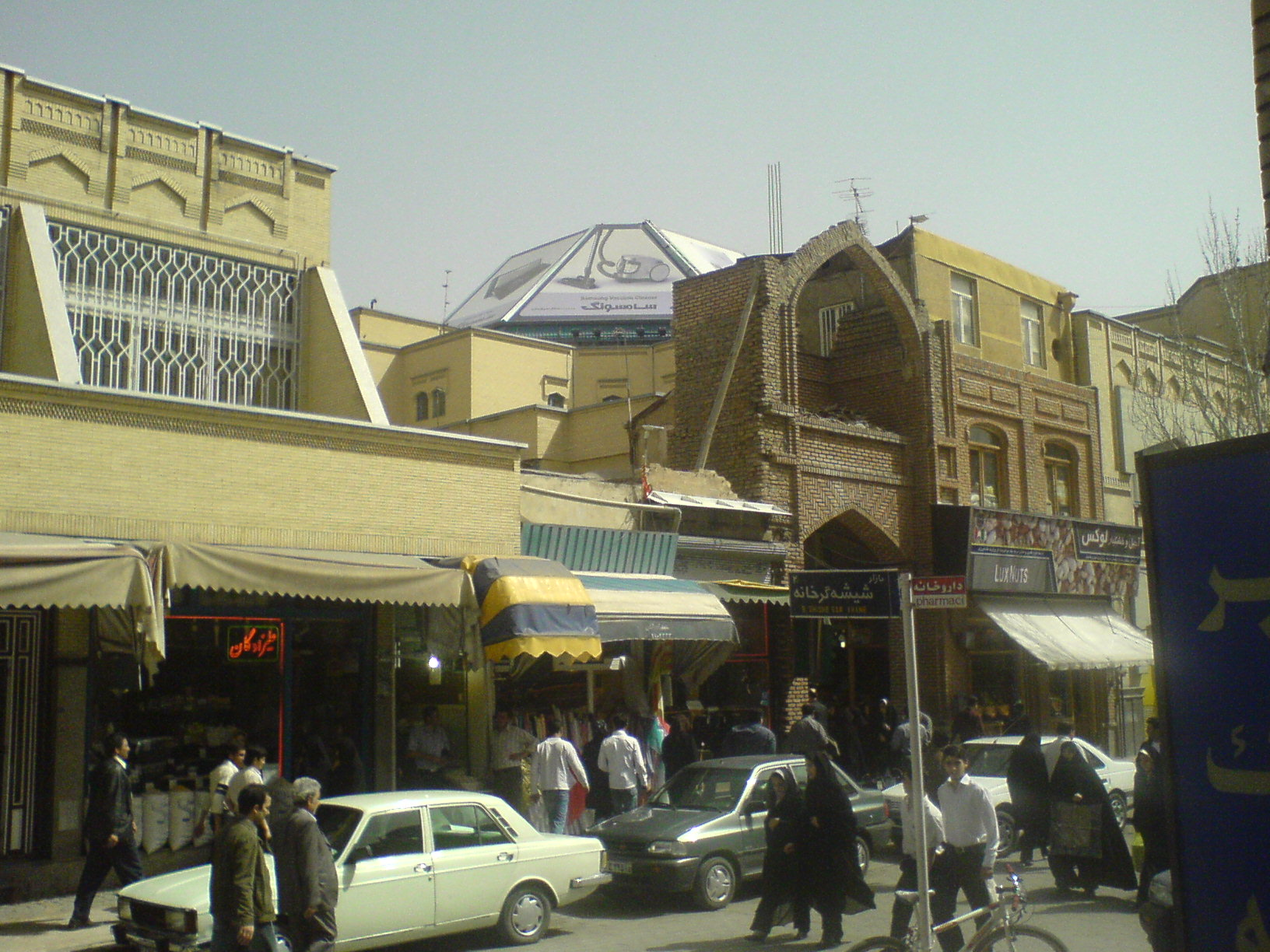

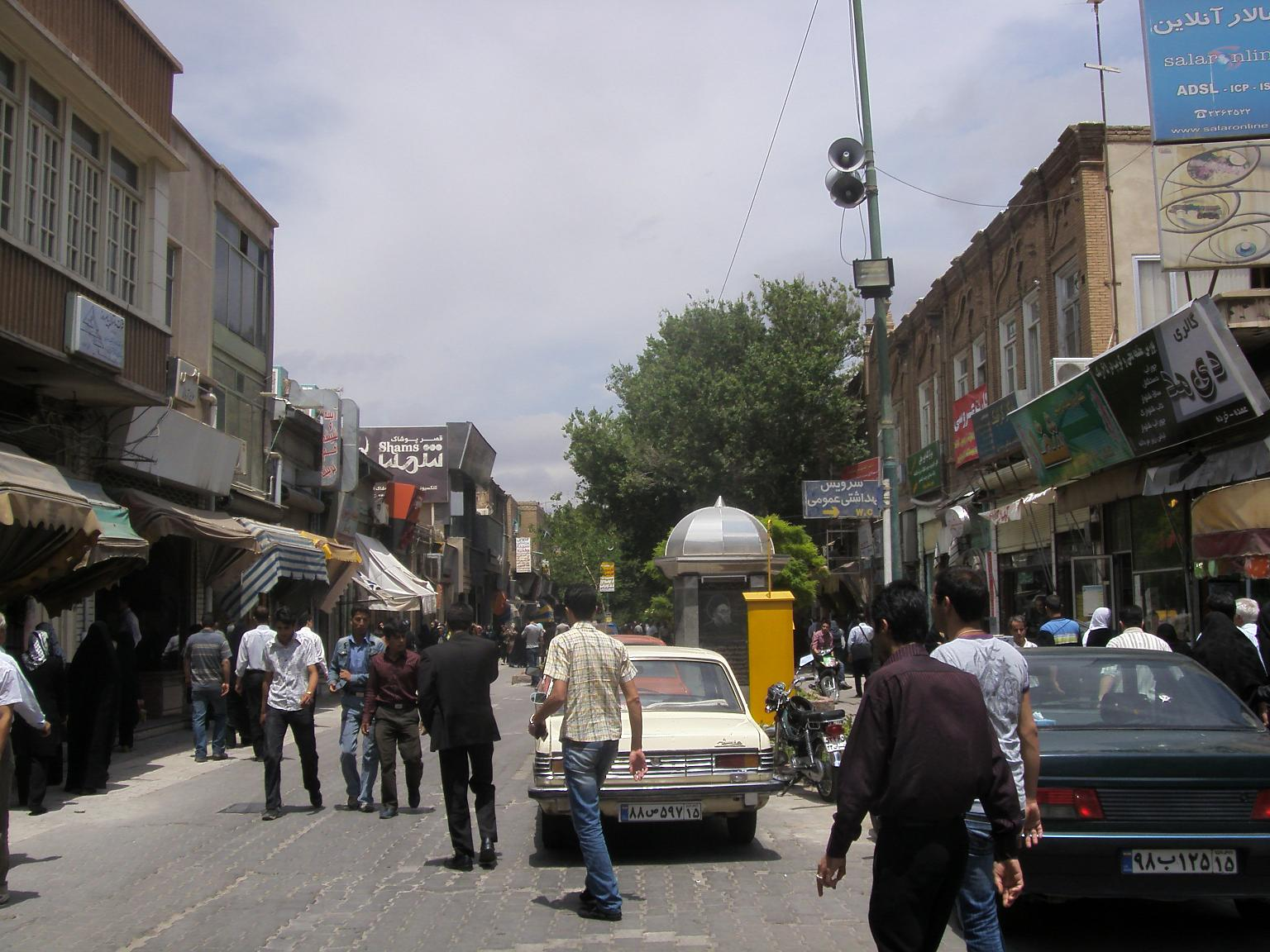

== See also ==
- Nobar Bathhouse
- Ferdowsi Street
- Shahnaz street
