= Tabriz Museum of Natural History =

Museum in Tabriz, Iran

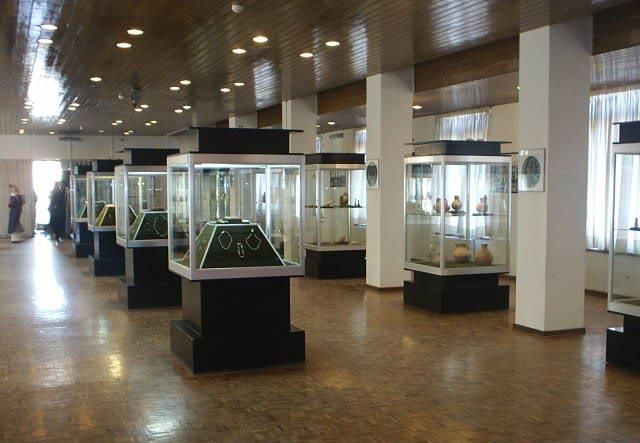
- Location: Iran
- Coordinates: 38°04′N 46°19′E
- Location of Tabriz Museum of Natural History

Tabriz Museum of Natural History (Persian: موزه تاریخ طبیعی تبریز) is a museum of wild life in the city of Tabriz at north western Iran, established in 1993 by Department of Environment of Iran. The museum includes many of taxidermy of wild mammals, reptiles, birds, and aquatics which are inhabiting in Iranian Azerbaijan, Iran, and some other countries. It also have a section for sculptures of dinosaurs.
