= Anthropological theories of value =

Field of study

Anthropological theories of value attempt to expand on the traditional theories of value used by economists or ethicists. They are often broader in scope than the theories of value of Adam Smith, David Ricardo, John Stuart Mill, Karl Marx, etc. usually including sociological, political, institutional, and historical perspectives (transdisciplinarity). Some have influenced feminist economics.

The basic premise is that economic activities can only be fully understood in the context of the society that creates them. The concept of "value" is a social construct, and as such is defined by the culture using the concept. Yet we can gain some insights into modern patterns of exchange, value, and wealth by examining previous societies. An anthropological approach to economic processes allows us to critically examine the cultural biases inherent in the principles of modern economics. Anthropological linguistics is a related field that looks at the terms we use to describe economic relations and the ecologies they are set within. Many anthropological economists (or economic anthropologists) are reacting against what they see as the portrayal of modern society as an economic machine that merely produces and consumes.

Marcel Mauss and Bronisław Malinowski for example wrote about objects that circulate in society without being consumed. Georges Bataille wrote about objects that are destroyed, but not consumed. Bruce Owens talks about objects of value that are neither circulating nor consumed (e.g. gold reserves, warehoused paintings, family heirlooms).

== Value as meaning-making ==
David Graeber attempts to synthesize the insights of Karl Marx and Marcel Mauss. He sees value as a model for human meaning-making. Starting with Marxist definitions of consumption and production, he introduces Mauss's idea of "objects that are not consumed" and posits that the majority of human behavior consists of activities that would not be properly categorized as either consumption or production.

== Criticisms ==
Some behaviors that do not appear to fall under the categories of consumption or production can be interpreted as complex or indirect examples of consumption or production. For example, writing might be treated as the production of material for someone to consume through reading, and might be performed for some return in value (such as prestige). Other behaviors may be usefully interpreted as analogous to consumption or production. For example, window shoppers can be seen as consuming a product by spending attention on shop displays, which are produced by marketers. In addition, some behaviors that do not appear to match the description of consumption can be understood as replacements for consumption. For example, a person that cooks a meal instead of purchasing it can be seen as having paid for that meal through labor instead of wages. Gary Becker's household production functions and similar topics note that people often purchase goods and then combine them with time to produce something that has meaning or practicality to them (which produce utility).

== See also ==
- Conformity
- Reciprocity (cultural anthropology)
- Westernization
