= Museum of Contemporary Art Ahvaz =

Museum in Ahvaz, Iran

Coordinates: 31.3145°N 48.6753°E

The Museum of Contemporary Art Ahvaz (MCAA; Persian: موزه هنرهای معاصر اهواز) was founded in 2005 on the eastern bank of the Karun River in Ahvaz, Iran. The museum opened in 2010. The museum includes works of art by Iranian and international artists focusing on contemporary art from Iran in particular.
