= Hamedan Museum of Natural History =

Museum in Hamedan, Iran

The Hamedan Museum of Natural History (Persian: موزه تاریخ طبیعی همدان) is a natural history museum located in the Bu-Ali Sina University in Hamedan, north-western Iran.

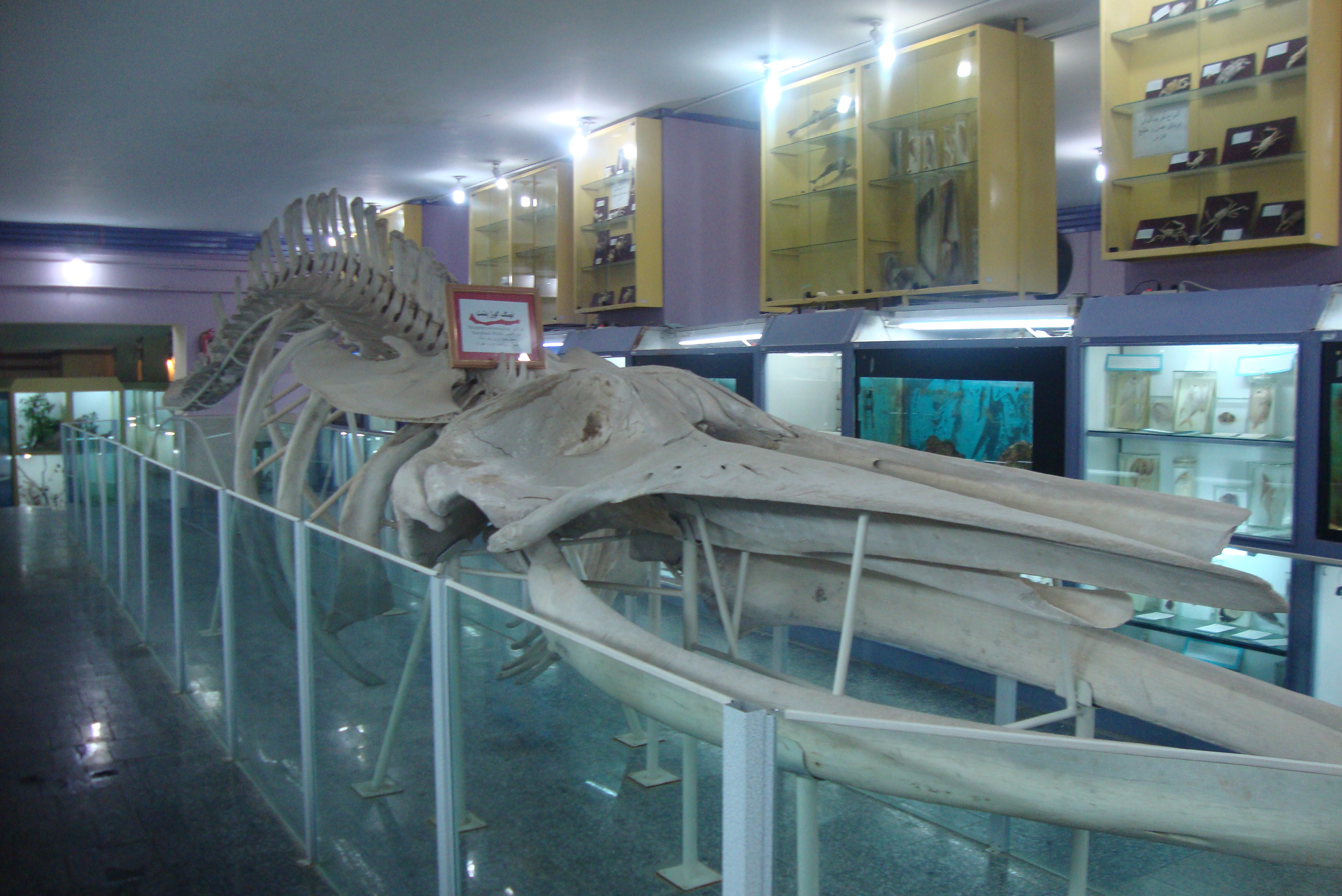
Fish Hall

The museum has several exhibition halls. The first hall of this museum is the Persian Gulf Hall, which houses a variety of bivalves, gastropods, snails, crustaceans, corals and sponges of the Persian Gulf.

The second hall is dedicated to the insects and contains various insects of different kinds. This hall also houses butterflies found in Iran.

The third hall is for mammals and birds, and the collection of birds and mammals of Iran, which have a special value and prestige, is placed in this hall.
