= Nobar Bathhouse =

Historical public bath in Tabriz, Iran

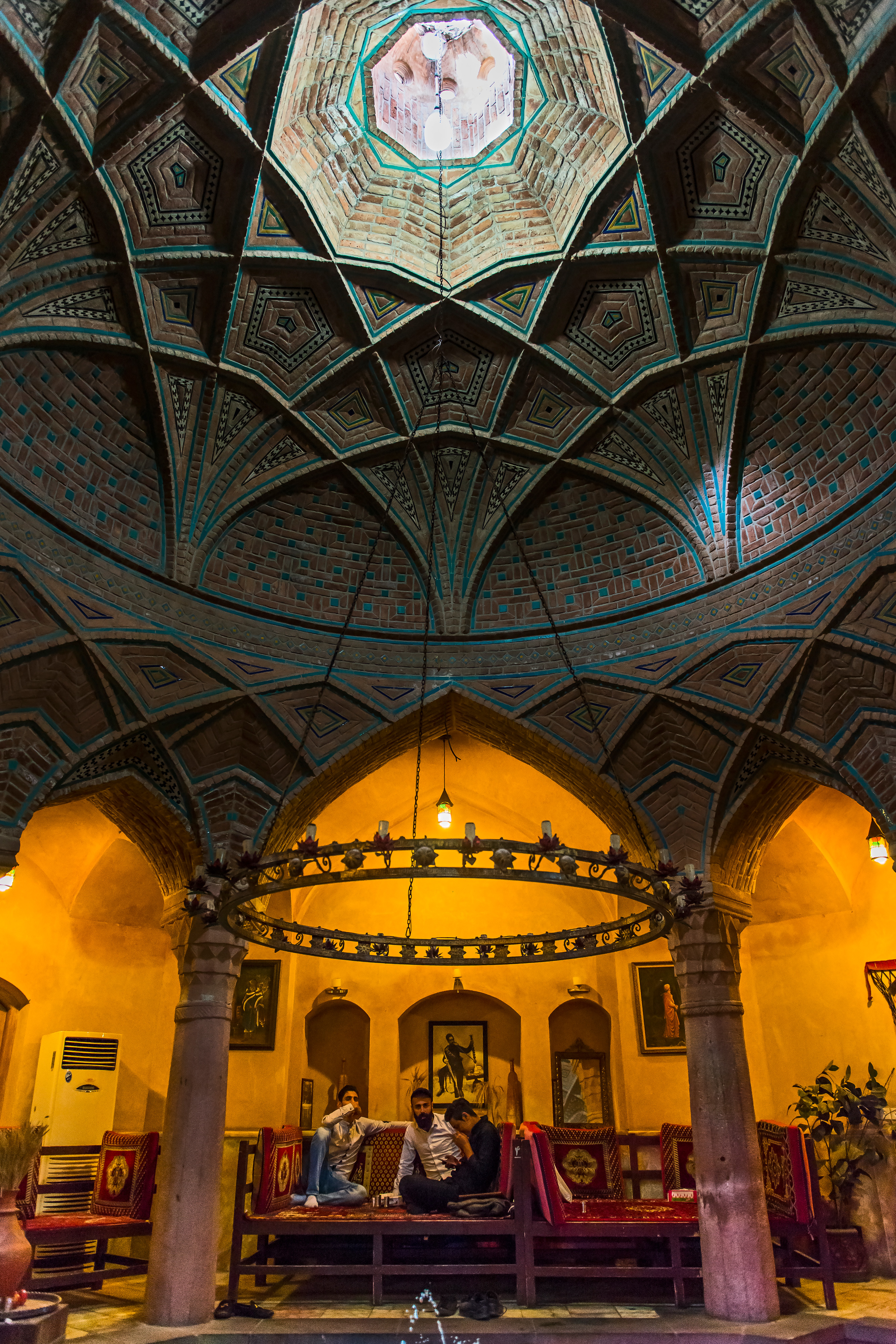
- Interactive map of the Nobar Bathhouse area

General information
- Location: Tabriz, Iran

The Nobar Bathhouse (Persian: حمام نوبر) is one of the historical public baths in Tabriz, Iran. It was constructed in the centre of the city near the Nobar gate, one of the old gates of Tabriz. Nobar bathhouse, which covers an area about 700 square metres (7,500 sq ft), was used as a public bath until 1994. Its ruins have been restored by Cultural Heritage Organization of East Azarbaijan Province and registered as part of Iran's National Heritage.

== Architectural plan ==
Like the other bathhouses in Iran, Nobar bathhouse has a narrow passage, Sar-beena (where people dressed and undressed), heating centre, water pool and Garm-Khaneh (washing part) which is ornamented with brick and tile works. Moreover, there were some private bath rooms called Shah-neshin for royal families.

== Restoration ==
The restoration of Nobar bath has lasted for six years. After restoration it was equipped and turned into a traditional restaurant divided into three parts and a tea house. In the upstairs Kebabs and other local foods and sweets are served.

== See also ==
- Hammam
- Public bathing
- Tarbiat street
- Nobar
