= Ardabil Anthropology Museum =

Museum in Ardabil, Iran

Coordinates: 38.2497°N 48.2888°E

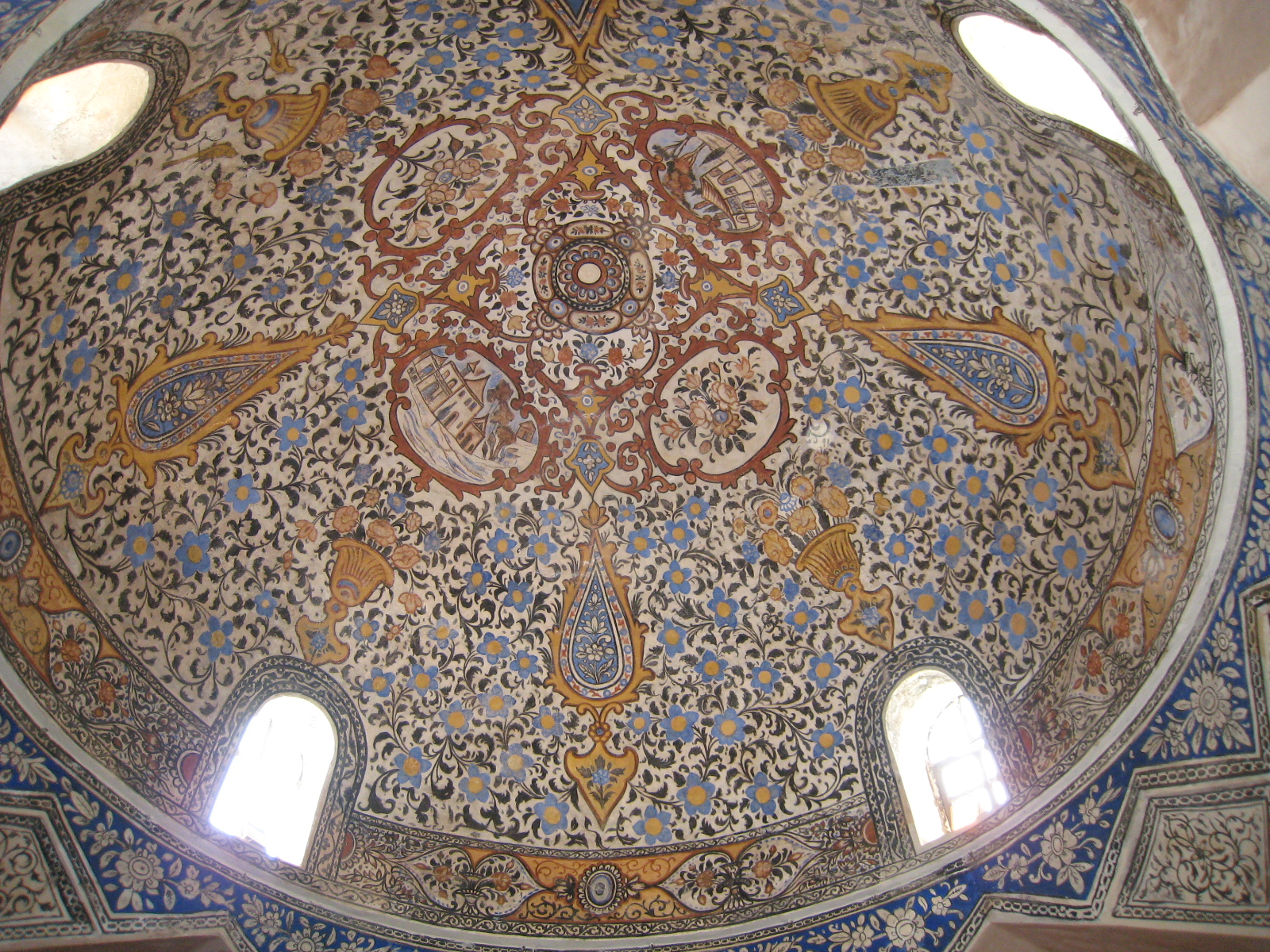
Dome of Museum

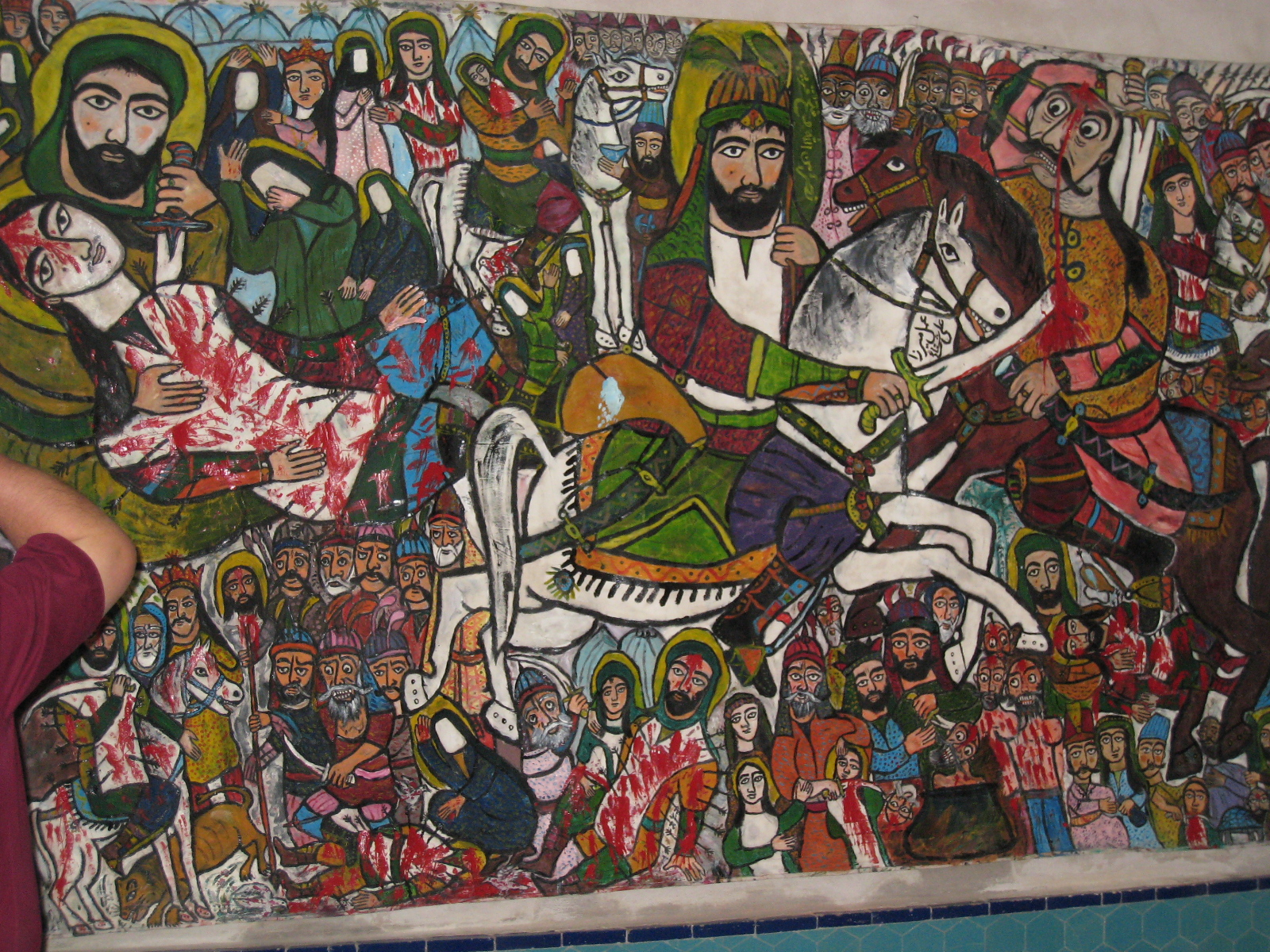
panel painting shows the Day of Ashura

Ardabil Anthropology Museum (Persian: موزه مردم‌شناسی اردبیل) is a museum in Ardabil, Iran. The building of the museum was originally a historical bath with the name of Zahir-al-Islam, belonging to the pre-Safavid period, about second half of the seventh century AH. Cultural Heritage Organization of Iran changed it to the Museum of Anthropology in 1999.
