= Shahnaz street =

Street in Tabriz, Iran

Coordinates: 38°03′56″N 46°17′01″E

Shahnaz street (Persian: خیابان شهناز) is a street in Tabriz, Iran. The street is known because of its architecture, the churches and shops.

== See also ==
- Tarbiyat street
- Ferdowsi Street
