= Kouy Valiasr =

Wealthy district in Tabriz, Iran

Coordinates: 38.0500°N 46.3500°E

Kouy Valiasr is a wealthy district located in the eastern part of Tabriz, Iran.
