= Jome Mosque =

Former mosque in Ardabil, Iran

Friday Mosque of Ardabil مسجد جامع اردبیل

- Location of the former mosque in Iran

Religion
- Affiliation: Shia Islam (former)
- Ecclesiastical or organisational status: Friday mosque (former)
- Status: Abandoned (partial ruinous state)

Location
- Location: Ardabil, Ardabil Province
- Country: Iran
- Coordinates: 38°15′06″N 48°18′14″E

Architecture
- Type: Mosque architecture
- Style: Seljuq
- Completed: Seljuk era (mosque); 878 AH (1473/1474 CE) (minaret)

Specifications
- Dome: One (maybe more)
- Minaret: One
- Materials: Bricks

Iran National Heritage List
- Official name: Ardabil Friday Mosque
- Type: Friday Mosque
- Designated: 1936
- Reference no.: 248
- Conservation organization: Cultural Heritage, Handicrafts and Tourism Organization of Iran

The Jome Mosque (Persian: مسجد جمعه اردبیل), also known as the Aradabil Jame' (Jameh) Mosque and as the Jame' Mosque, (Note: Other variations include: Ardebil Jomeh Mosque, Jome Masjed, Atigh Mosque, Jame (Jome) Mosque of Ardabil, and Masjid al-Jami.) is a former Shi'ite Friday mosque, now in partial ruins, located in Ardabil, in the Ardabil province of Iran. The mosque was built during the Seljuk era.

The former mosque was added to the Iran National Heritage List on 18 June 1936, administered by the Cultural Heritage, Handicrafts and Tourism Organization of Iran.

== Overview ==
Built during the Seljuk era in the Pir Shamseddin district, the remains of the Ardabil Jomeh Mosque are situated in the grounds of a cemetery. The minaret, located adjacent to the mosque, is constructed of brick, on an octagon base and with a cylindrical body. There are two inscriptions on the minaret that reveal it was built on the order of Ozon Hassan Agh Ghoyonlou and that it was completed in 878 AH (1473/1474 CE). The inscriptions are preserved in the National Museum of Iran. The old brick mosque includes a dome and four arches. Ceramic and other objects discovered on the former mosque site are from the Saljuqian era.

== Gallery ==
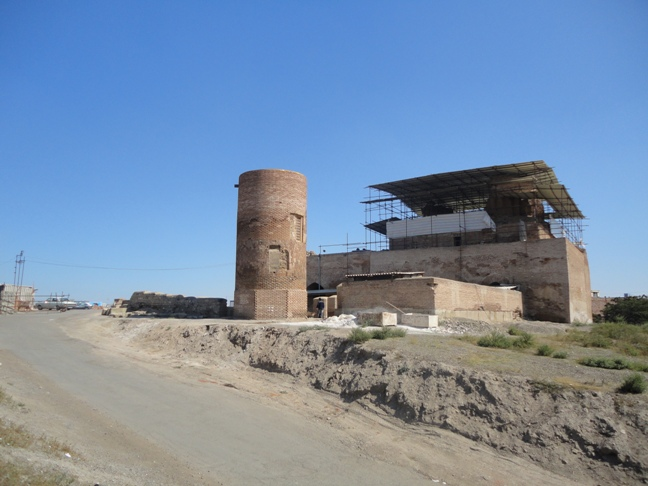
The mosque in 2011

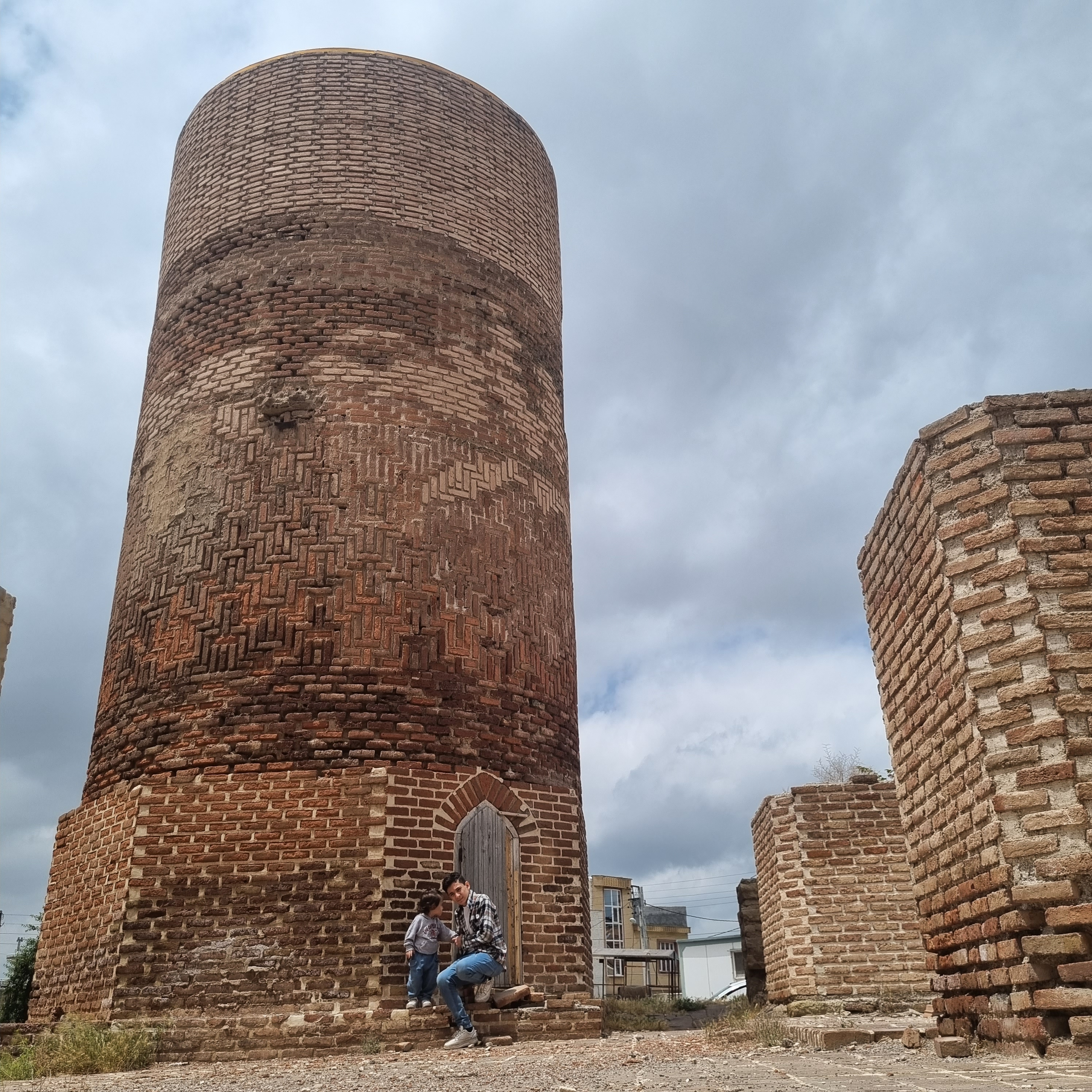
The minaret, in 2024

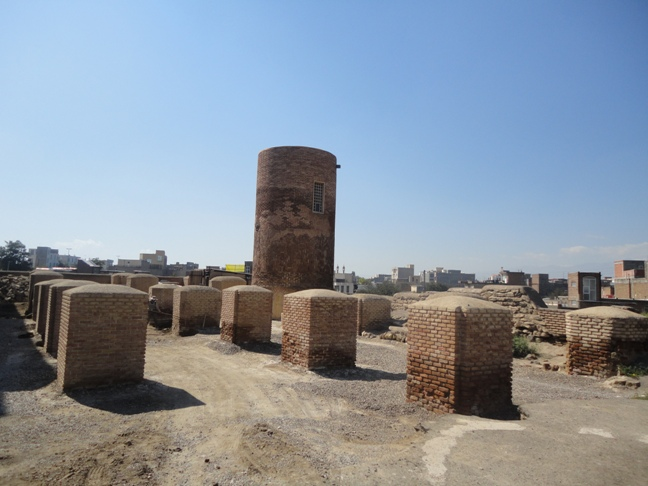
Other brick structures near the minaret

== See also ==
- Shia Islam in Iran
- List of mosques in Iran
