= Jebrael Nokandeh =

Iranian archaeologist (b. 1972)

- Born: July 1972 (age 54); Sari, Mazandaran, Iran
- Occupations: Director, National Museum of Iran
- Employer: ICHTO
- Website: http://nmi.ichto.ir/

Jebrael Nokandeh (Persian: جبرئیل نوکنده) is an Iranian archaeologist. He is the director of the National Museum of Iran.

== Career ==
Jebrael Nokandeh received his MA in archaeology from Tehran University and his Ph.D. from the Free University of Berlin. He is the Director of the National Museum of Iran. He is a member of the Research Council of the Iranian Center for Archaeological Research (ICAR) and a scientific member of the Research Institute of Cultural Heritage and Tourism (RICHT). During the Government Week Celebration in late 2016, he was chosen as the Outstanding Director within the Iranian Cultural Heritage, Handicrafts, and Tourism Organization.

Nokandeh is an experienced field archaeologist with extensive experience in Iran, including Khuzestan province, the Mehran Plain in the Ilam province, the Caspian Littoral of Gilan, and the Golestan province, where he conducted surveys and excavations in the Gorgan Wall Project.

As director of the National Museum in 2015, he established a new prehistoric exhibition on the second floor of the Museum and completed the 9-year-old renovation and restoration of the Islamic Era Museum. His focus has been on the data integration of the various departments, organizing storage areas and producing various catalogs of the museum's important collections. He organized and directed highly successful exhibitions locally and at foreign museums in Italy, India, and Germany. As a part of its 80th anniversary, the National Museum of Iran hosted an exhibition of works from the Louvre in March 2018.

== Selected publications ==
- Nokandeh, J. 2004 „The Metal Vessels of the Gorgan Plain: Bazgir Hoard“, in: ABSTRACTS in 4th International Congress on the Archaeology of the Ancient Near East (4. ICAA¬NE), 29-March-3 April, Freie Universität Berlin, p. 109.
- Ohtsu, T., Nokandeh, J. and Takuro, A. 2004 „Excavation Research of Tappe Jalaliye”, in: Ohtsu, T., Nokandeh, J. and Yama¬uchi, K. (eds.) Preliminary Report of the Iran Japan Joint Archaeological Expedition to Gilan, Second Season. 2002, Iranian Cultural Heritage and Tourism Organization, Tehran, Middle Eastern Culture Center in Japan, Tokyo, pp. 48–84.
- Nokandeh, J,. 2004 „Excavation of Tappe Jalaliye: Outline of Excavation 2004”, in: Ohtsu, T., No¬kandeh, J. and Yamauchi, K. (eds.) Preliminary Report of the Iran Japan Joint Archaeological Expedition to Gilan, Fourth Season, Iranian Cultural Heritage and Tourism Organization, Tehran, Middle Eastern Culture Center in Japan, Tokyo, pp. 61–67.
- Nokandeh, J. 2005 „Arg-e Dasht, the first Neolithic Discovered Region in Gilan province” in: Oht¬su, T., Nokandeh, J., Yamauchi, K. (eds.) preliminary Report of the Iran Japan Joint Archaeological Expedition to Gilan: Fourth Season, Iranian Cultural He¬ritage and Tourism Organization, Tehran, Middle Eastern Culture Center in Japan, Tokyo, pp. 50–56.
- Nokandeh, J., Sauer, E., Omrani Rekavandi, H., Wilkinson, T., Abbasi, G.A., Schwenninger, J.-L., Mahmoudi, M., Parker, D., Fattahi, M., Usher-Wilson, L.S., Ershadi, M., Ratcliffe, J. und Gale, R., 2006 Linear Barriers of Northern Iran: The Great Wall of Gorgan and the Wall of Tammishe.’ Iran, Vol .44: 121-73.
- Nokandeh, J. 2010: „Archaeological Survey in the Mehran plain, South-western Iran“ in: Matthiae, P., Pinnock, F., Nigro, L. Marchett, N., Romano, L. (eds), Proceedings of the 6th International Congress on the Archaeology of the Ancient Near East May, 5th-10th 2008, “Sapienza” - Università di Roma. Harrasso¬witz, Wiesbaden. Vol. 2: 483–509.
- Berberian, M. Malek Shahmirzadi, S. Nokandeh, J AND Djamali, M., 2012, Archaoseimicity and environmental Crises at the Sialk Mounds, Central Iranian Plateau, Since the early Neolithic, Journal of Archaeological Science. 39: 2845–2858.
- Sauer Eberhard, Nokandeh, Jebrael, Omrani Rekavandi, Hamid 2015 Forts and Mega-Fortresses, natural and artificial barriers: the grand strategy of the Sasanian Empire, in: Abstracts International Congress of Young Archaeologist, Azizi Kharanaghi, Khanipour, M and Naseri, R (eds), Tehran, RICHTO press, PP 154.
