= National Museum of Iran =

Museum in Tehran, Iran

Coordinates: 35°41′13.36″N 51°24′52.60″E

- موزهٔ ملی ایران; Muze-ye Melli-ye Irān

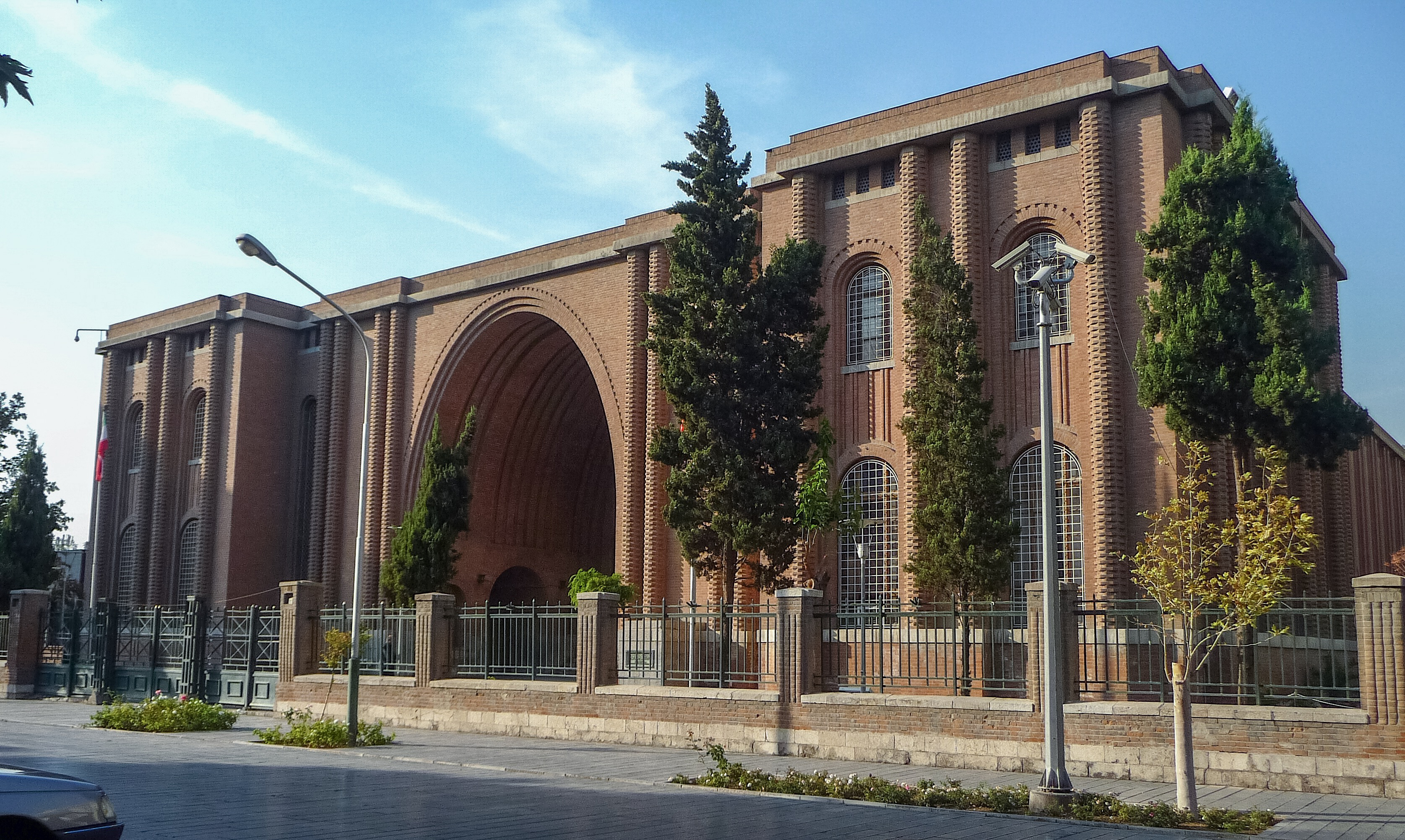
- Facade of the National Museum of Iran, Tehran
- Established: 1937; 88 years
- Location: Tehran, Iran
- Type: Archaeology museum
- Collection size: 3 million+ (300,000 on display)
- Visitors: 500,000 (2011)
- Director: Jebrael Nokandeh
- Owner: ICHTO
- Website: irannationalmuseum.ir

The National Museum of Iran (Persian: موزهٔ ملی ایران, romanized: Mūze-ye Melli-ye Irān) houses the richest and largest collection of Iranian antiquities in the world. It is located in Tehran. The museum is the world's most important institution for Iranian history and one of the most comprehensive museums globally, home to over 3 million artifacts. The institution is formed of two museums; the Museum of Ancient Iran and the Museum of the Islamic Era. The institution is also considered a major global research hub for archeology, and it includes multiple research departments, categorized by different historical periods. The museum is one of the oldest archaeological museums in West Asia, and one of the region's earliest institutions dedicated to historical preservation and display.

== History ==
Morteza Gholi Khan Hedayat proposed the creation of a museum and antiquities department in 1906, although this plan only came to fruition in 1916. The first museum was established in a room of the Ministry of Education on the north side of the Dar al-Fonun school building. The museum had 270 bronze artefacts (pottery, glass, coins, old weapons, seals, wooden objects, patches, books and textiles) collected by the Antiquities Department or donated by local citizens. In 1925, the artefacts were moved to the Masoudieh Mansion.

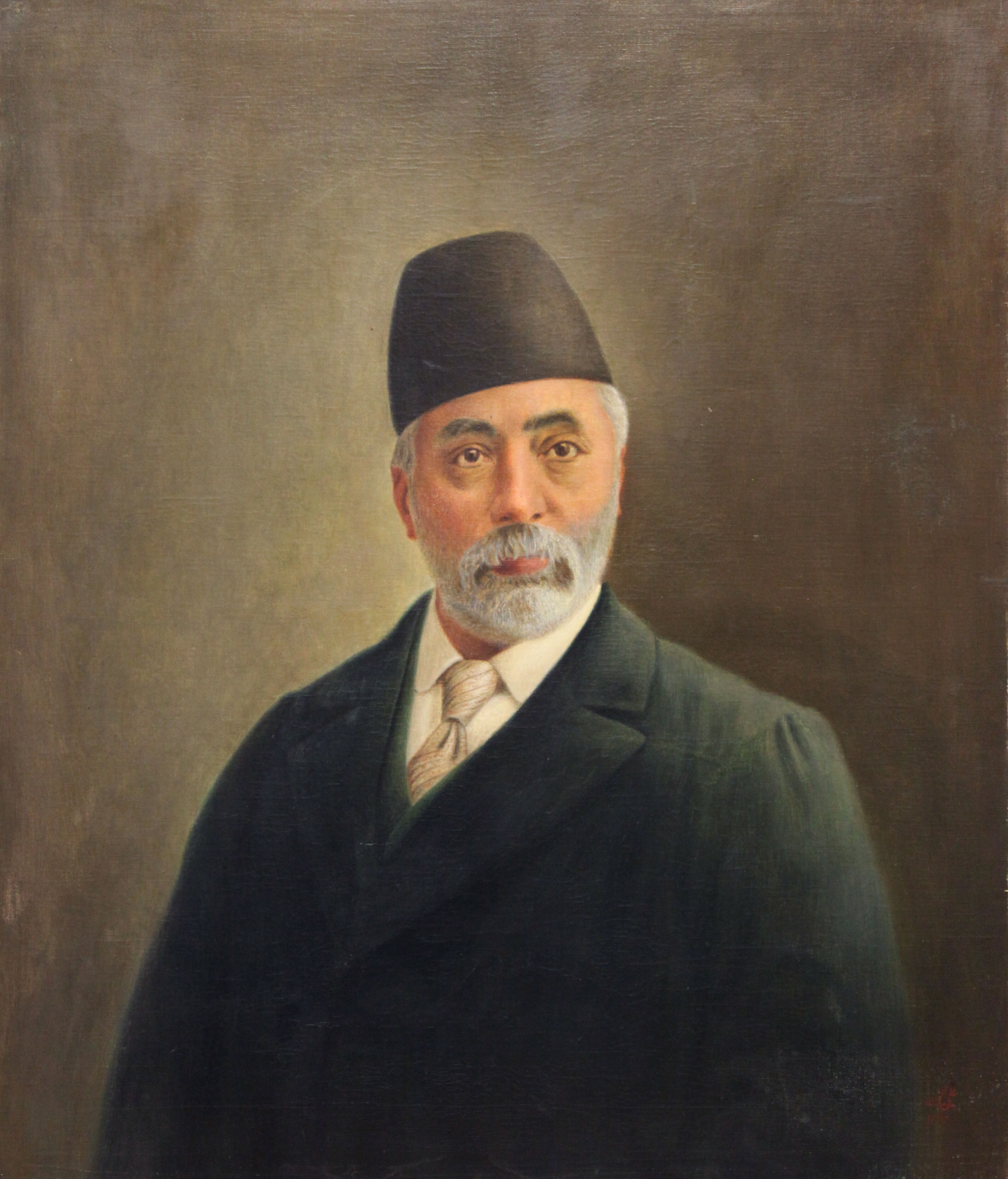
Morteza Gholi Khan Hedayat

With the start of excavations by European archaeologists, especially the French archaeological team headed by Jacques de Morgan in Susa (1897), Iranians began to comprehend the importance of cultural heritage. In 1927, the unconditional privilege of the French archaeologists in Iran was canceled. They were allowed to dig only in Susa. Since Iran had decided to establish a national museum and library, the privilege of designing and implementing it was given to France. For this purpose, the French architect Andre Godard came to Iran in 1929 to establish a museum and library and officially started his work.

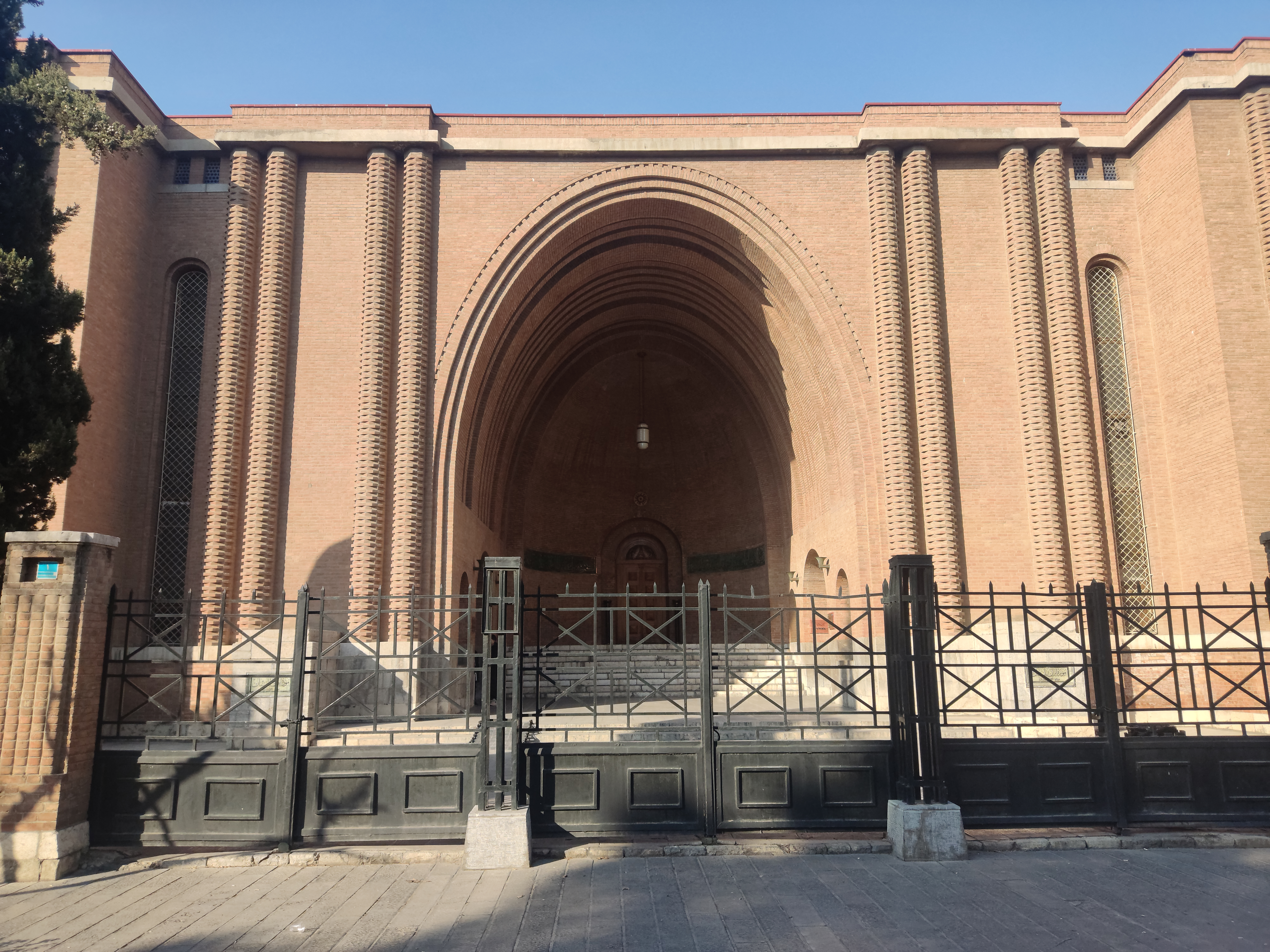
The entrance to Museum of Ancient Iran is built in Sassanid style, directly inspired by the Arch of Ctesiphon.

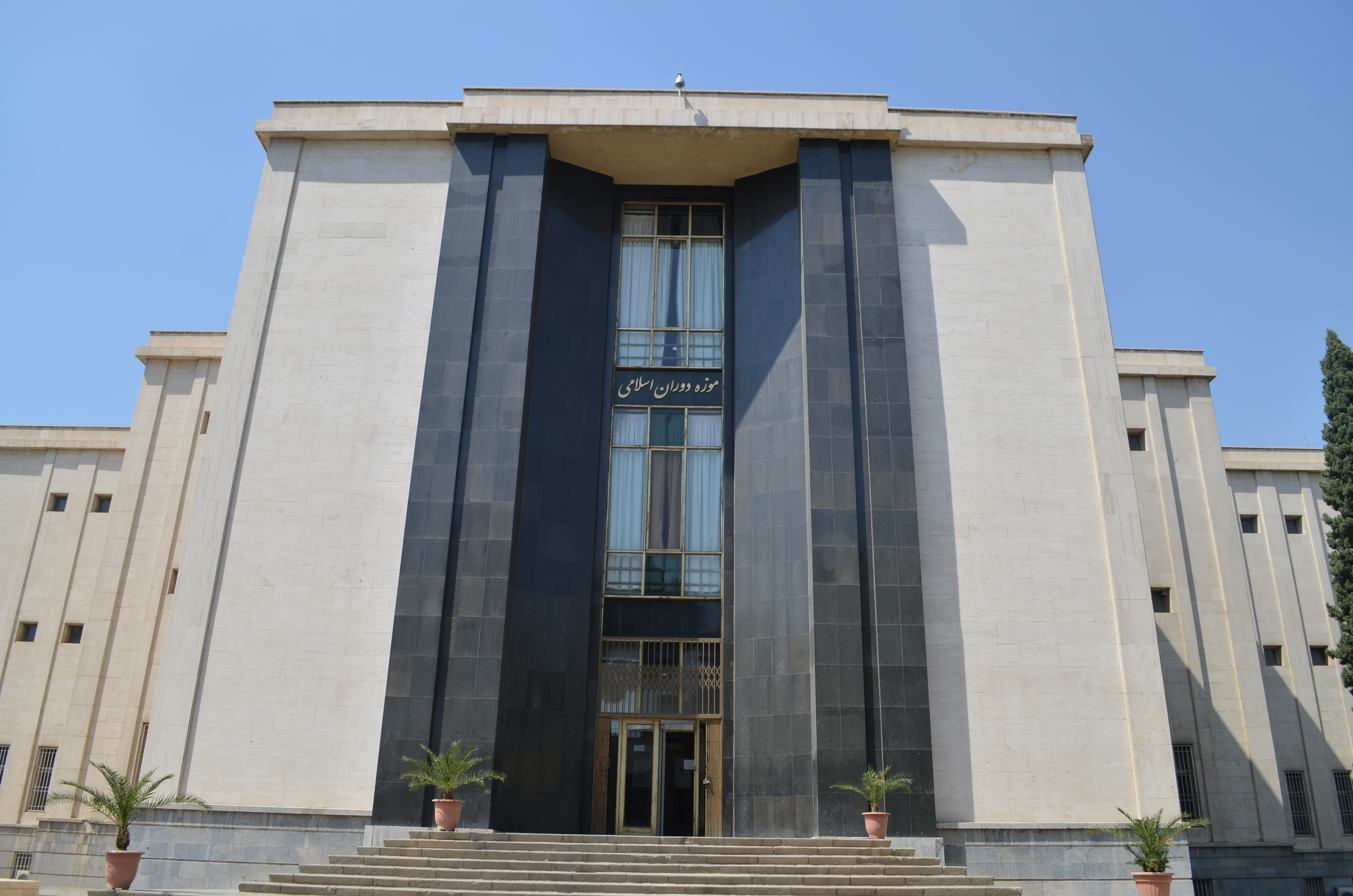
The entrance to Islamic Era Museum is built with an octagonal, cruciform architectural plan inspired from Bishapur.

The brick building of the Museum of Ancient Iran was designed by André Godard and Maxime Siroux in the early 20th century, and was influenced by Sassanid vaults, particularly the Taq Kasra at Ctesiphon. Its construction, with an area of about 11,000 square metres (13,000 sq yd), began in 1935 and was completed within two years by Abbas Ali Memar and Morad Tabrizi. It was then officially inaugurated in 1937.

The Museum of the Islamic Era was later built with white travertine on the grassy grounds of the Museum of Ancient Iran, and was still being remodeled when the Iranian Revolution swept the country.

While the Museum of Ancient Iran always had a clear mandate to show archaeological relics, as well as some rare medieval textiles and rug pieces, the newer complex also featured Amlash pottery from prehistoric Caspian Sea regions of Iran. The Museum of the Islamic Era exhibits over 1,500 works from Ilkanids, Seljuks, Timurids, Safavids, Qajars and more. The complex consists of three floors, and it contains various pieces of pottery, textiles, texts, artworks, astrolabes, and adobe calligraphy, from Iran's post-classical era.

The oldest artifacts kept at the Ancient Iran Museum are from Kashafrud, Darband, and Shiwatoo, which date back to the Lower Paleolithic period. Mousterian stone tools made by Neanderthals are on display at the first hall of the Museum of Ancient Iran. The most important Upper Paleolithic tools are from Yafteh, dating back about 30,000 to 35,000 years. The Museum of Ancient Iran consists of two floors. Its halls contain artifacts and fossils from the Lower, Middle, and Upper Paleolithic, as well as the Neolithic, Chalcolithic, early and late Bronze Age, and Iron Ages I-III, through the Elamite, Median, Achaemenid, Seleucid, Parthian, and Sassanian eras.

== Exhibitions ==
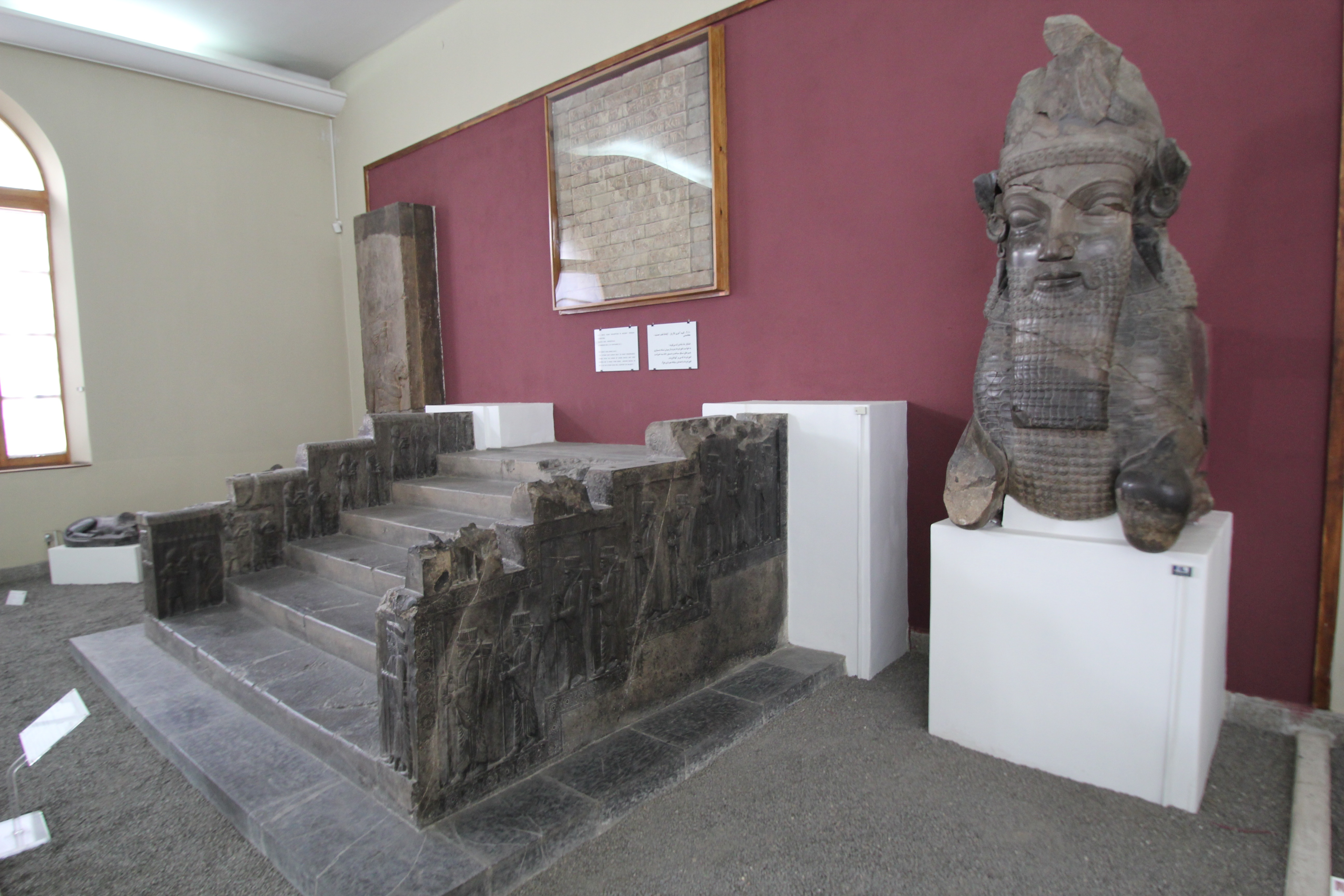
Part of the Achaemenid gallery, which displays the staircase of Persepolis, head of a Persian Lamassu, an inscription, and the relief of King's battle with lion.

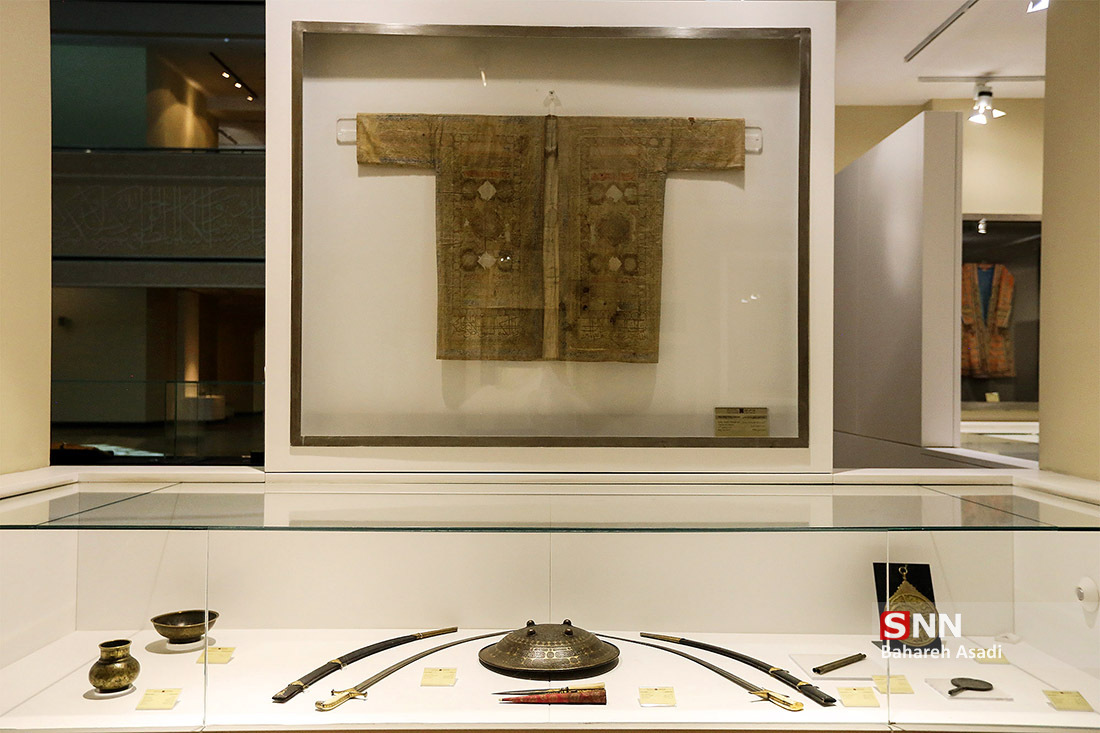
Part of the Safavid gallery, which displays Abbas the Great's dress, his shield, and his swords.

The National Museum of Iran and the British Museum held a major exhibition. It was held in collaboration with the Iranian government, which loaned the British Museum a number of iconic artefacts in exchange for an undertaking that the Cyrus Cylinder would be loaned to the National Museum of Iran in return. The Cylinder was displayed in September 2010 for a four-month period. The exhibition was very popular, attracting 48,000 people within the first ten days and about 500,000 people by the time it closed in January 2011.

To celebrate its 80th anniversary in 2018, the museum hosted 50 masterpieces from the Louvre and the Musée national Eugène Delacroix. The exhibition attracted over 250,000 visitors. An ancient Sassanid relief (224–651 AD), illegally smuggled to the United Arab Emirates during the 1980s, and left there in 2006, was later seized in the United Kingdom in 2016. Its value at an auction could exceed £30 million. The Iranian government was tracking the long-missing relief for years. In 2023, The Guardian reported that the relief had been discovered and confiscated at Stansted Airport in Essex. The British Museum received permission from Iran to display the relief for a short period of time, and then returned it home. After 35 years, on 28 June 2023, the Sassanid relief returned and a well-received exhibition was held at the National Museum of Iran. It is now permanently displayed at the Museum.

After 85 years, the Achaemenid tablets, which were loaned to the University of Chicago for study in 1930s, returned home. The 4,000 tablets were discovered in Persepolis and lent to the United States for a three-year study period. They were repatriated on the plane that also brought home the Iranian delegation from New York, after it attended the United Nations General Assembly. The tablets are among the most important works of Iranian history, and contain vital insights into road resource management, social relations, basic necessities of life, wages, and the economy of Achaemenid society from the time of Darius the Great (522–486 BC).

Another successful exhibitions was the "Silk Legacy" in 2025, which celebrated the millennia-old cultural ties between Iran and China. Other exhibitions are held continuously and annually at the museum. The museum has also held several highly successful exhibitions abroad. "The Glory of Ancient Persia" was held throughout China for 15 months in 2024. Over 200 artifacts went on display in Beijing (Forbidden City), Shanghai and Xinjiang, which attracted more than 50 million visitors and became the biggest abroad exhibition in the museum's history. Being home to one of the world's four remaining statues of Homer's Penelope, the museum showcased the statue alongside its three sisters at Prada Foundation in Milan in a 4-months-long event by Iran and Italy. All the four statues later went on display again in 2016, this time at the National Museum of Iran. Other exhibitions abroad were held in Spain, Germany and the Netherlands.

== Management ==
Name	Education/Activities
Andre Godard (1936-1960)	French architect, archaeologist and researcher. Head of the department of Antiquities and Museum of Ancient Iran and the founder of the National Museum of Iran. The designer of: National Library building, the tomb of Hafez, the tomb of Ferdowsi and the tomb of Saadi. The founder of the faculty of Fine Arts in the University of Tehran, and the first manager of this faculty.
Jebrael Nokandeh (Since 2015)	PhD in archeology from the Institute of Near Eastern Archeology (Berlin). Opening the section related to the prehistoric period, completing the restoration operation of the Museum of Islamic Arts after 9 years, integrating the data of different sections, organizing storage areas and producing different catalogs of the museum's important collections, and holding joint programs between the National Museum of Iran and the largest museums around the world such as Louvre, Museum Island etc.

== Gallery ==
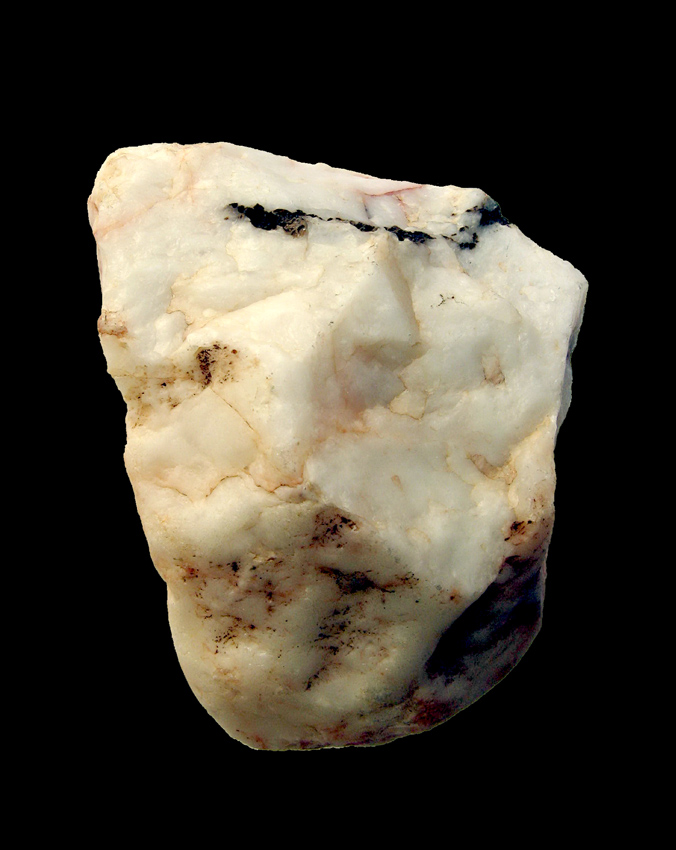
Chopper from the Lower Paleolithic, found at Kashafrud.

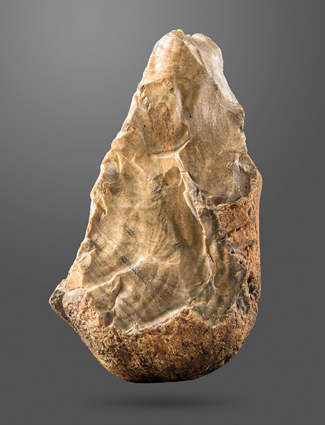
Trihedral from the Lower Paleolithic, found at Amar Merdeg.

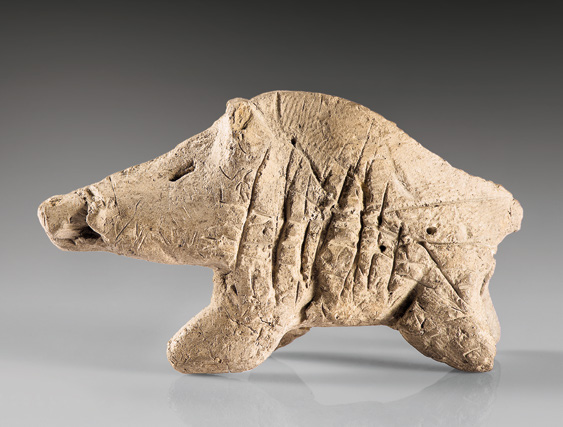
Clay boar figurine from the Neolithic period, found at Tepe Sarab.

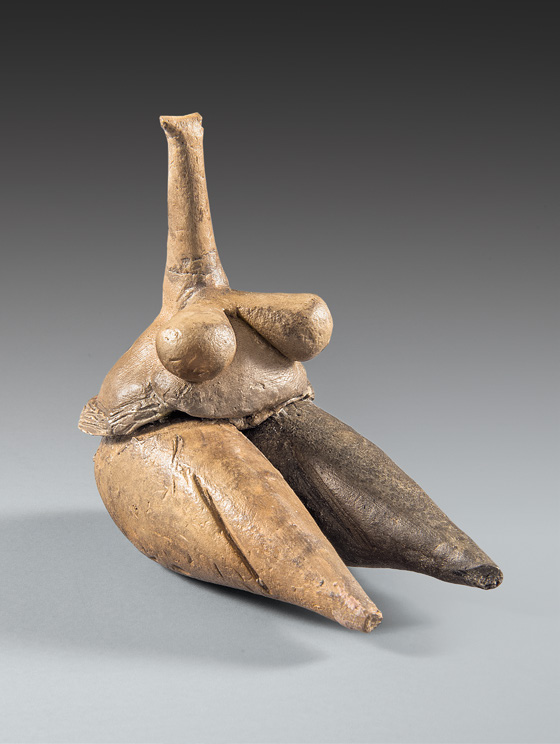
A clay figurine of a fertility goddess found at Tepe Sarab, dating back to the Neolithic.

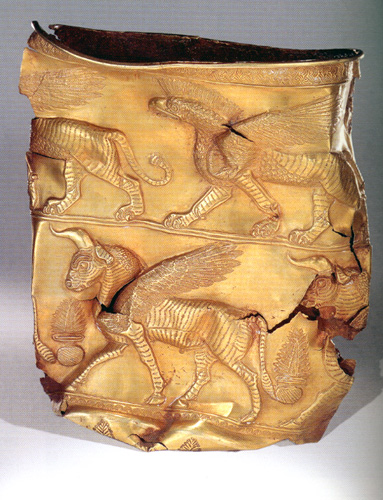
Iron-Age gold cup from Marlik.

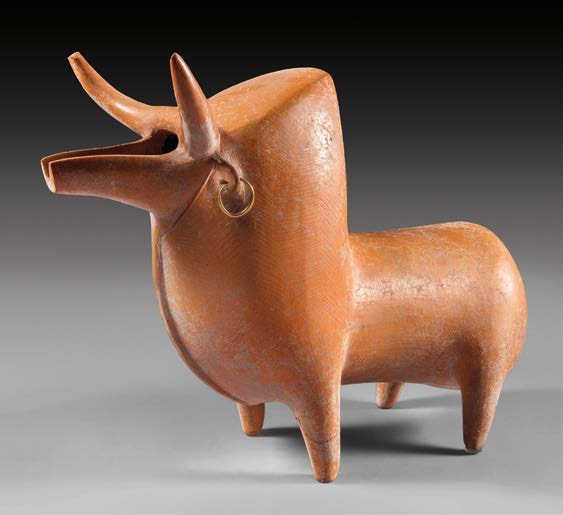
Iron-Age animal statue from Marlik.

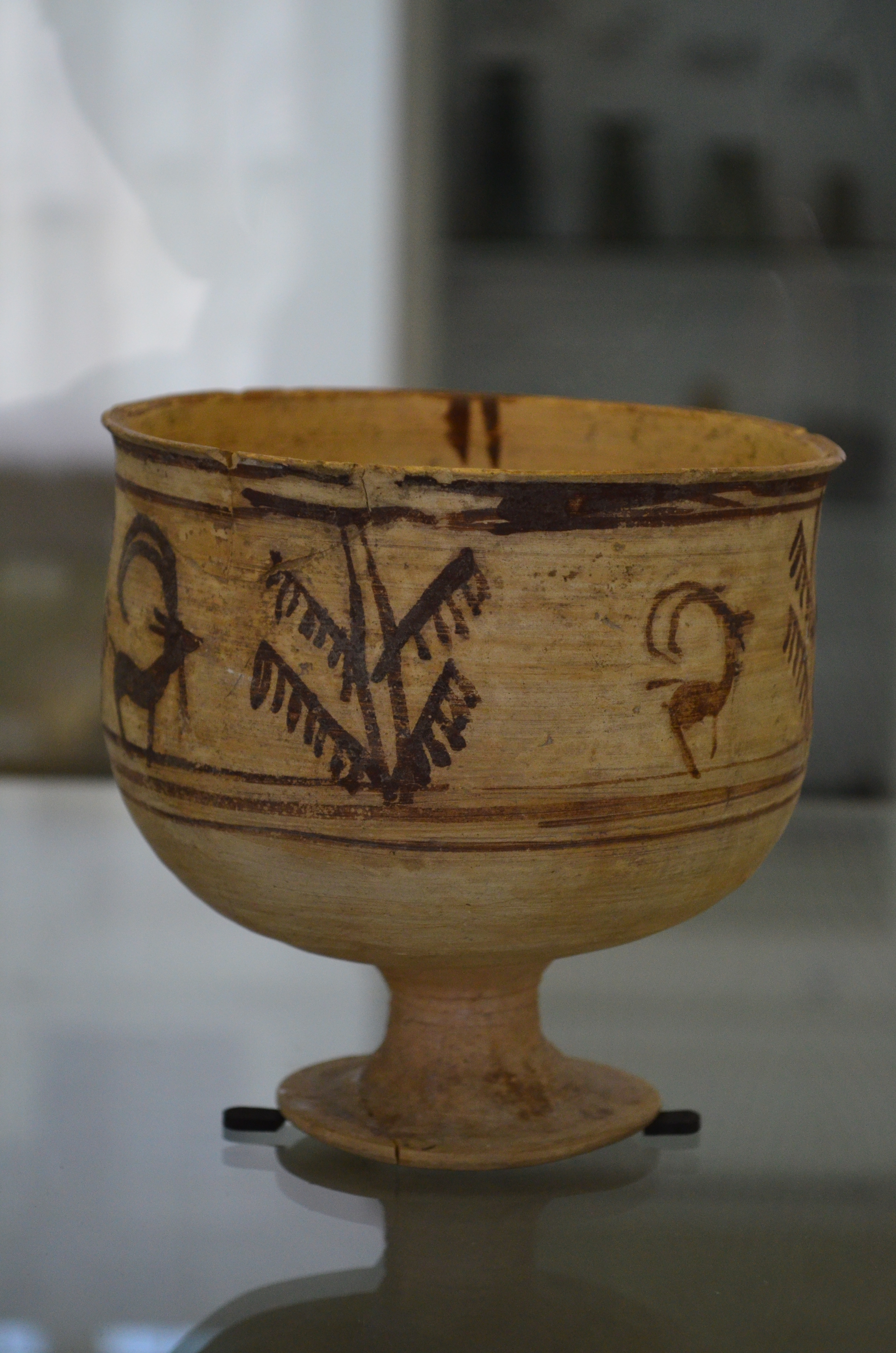
Pottery from Shahr-e Sukhteh, the world's first known animation.

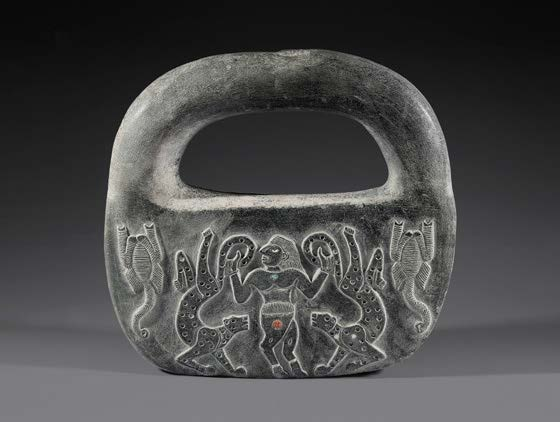
A chlorite object with the Master of Animals motif related to the Jiroft culture, dating back to Bronze Age I, from Kerman

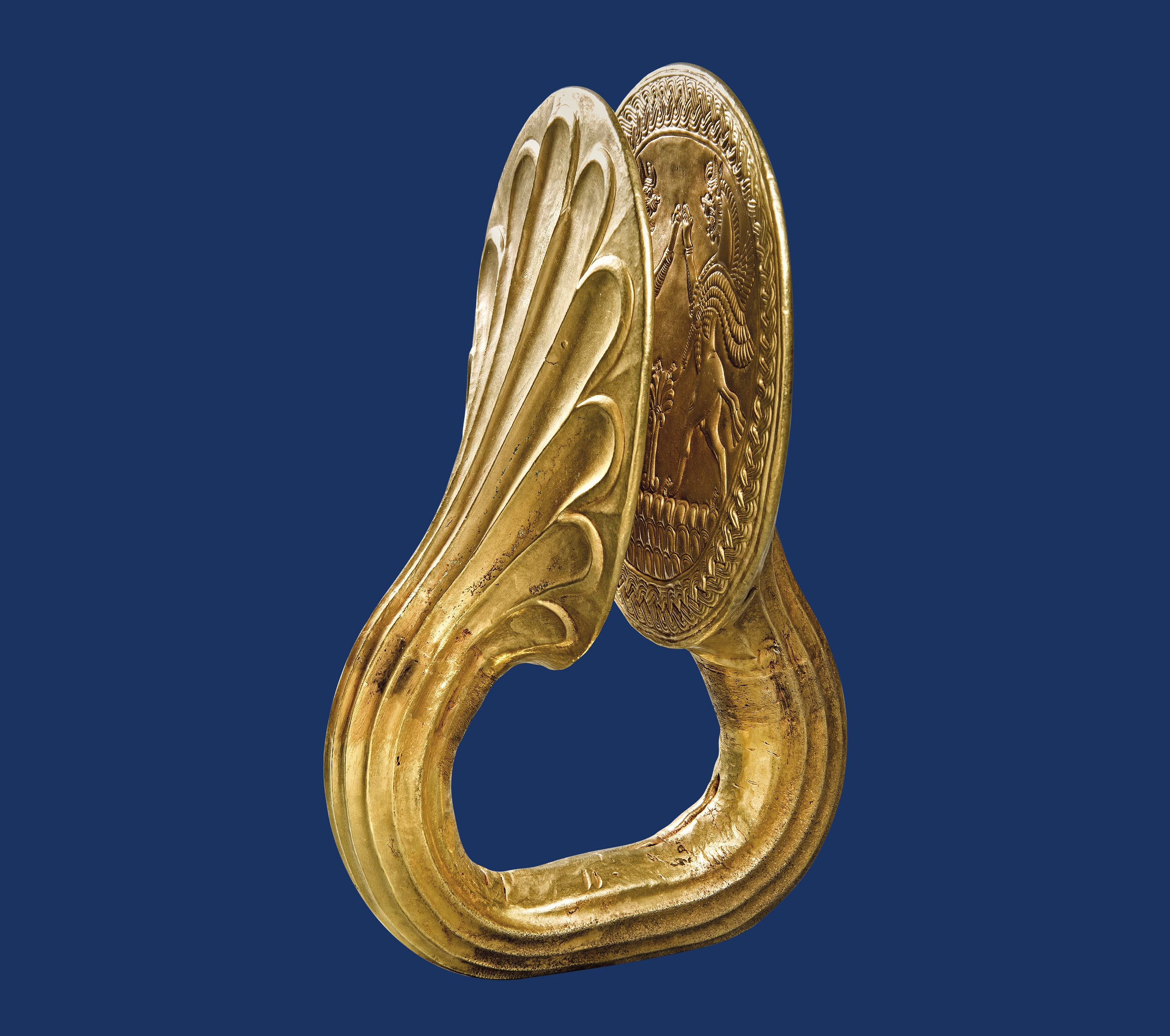
Ring of Power, Elamite period.

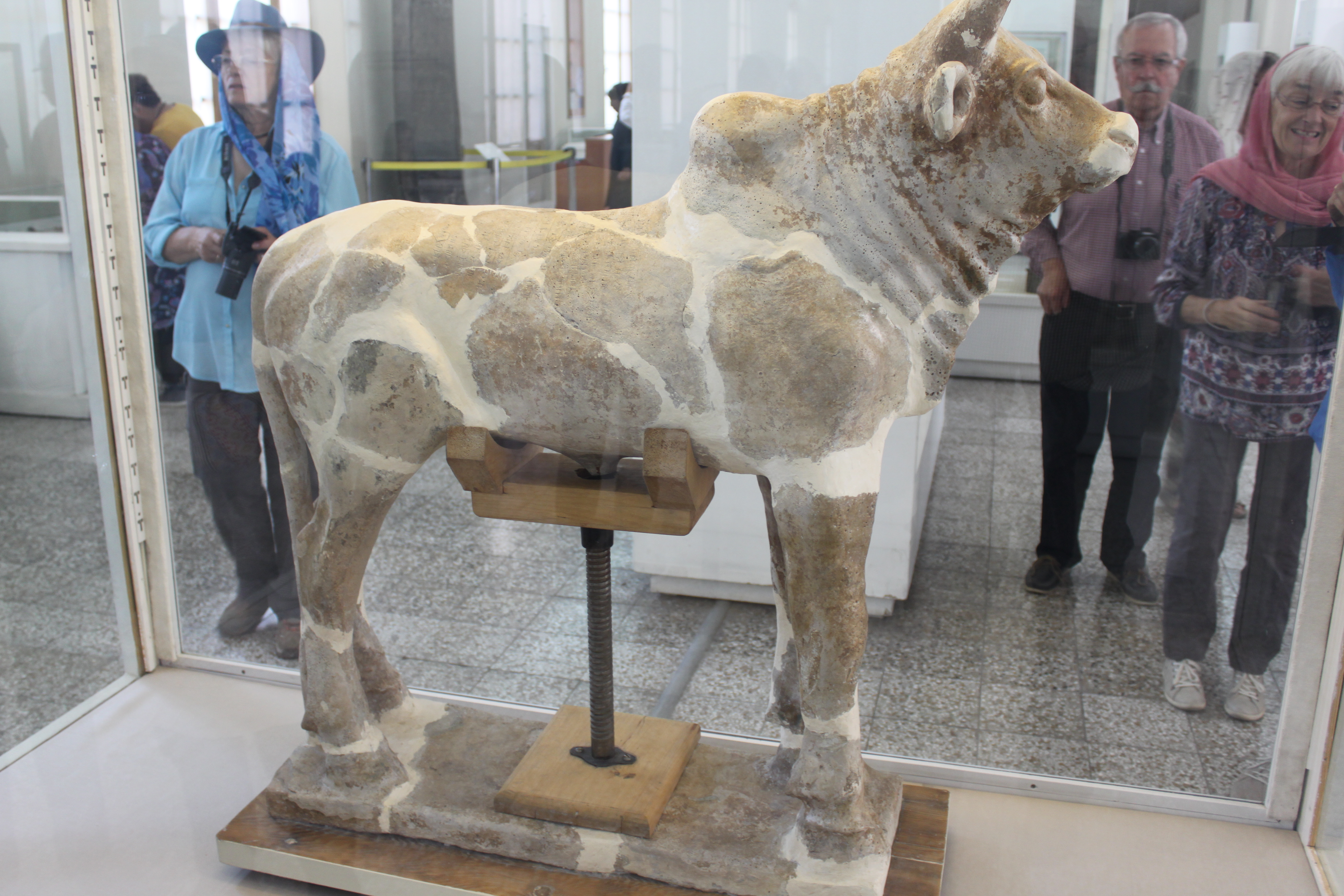
The guardian bull of Chogha Zanbil

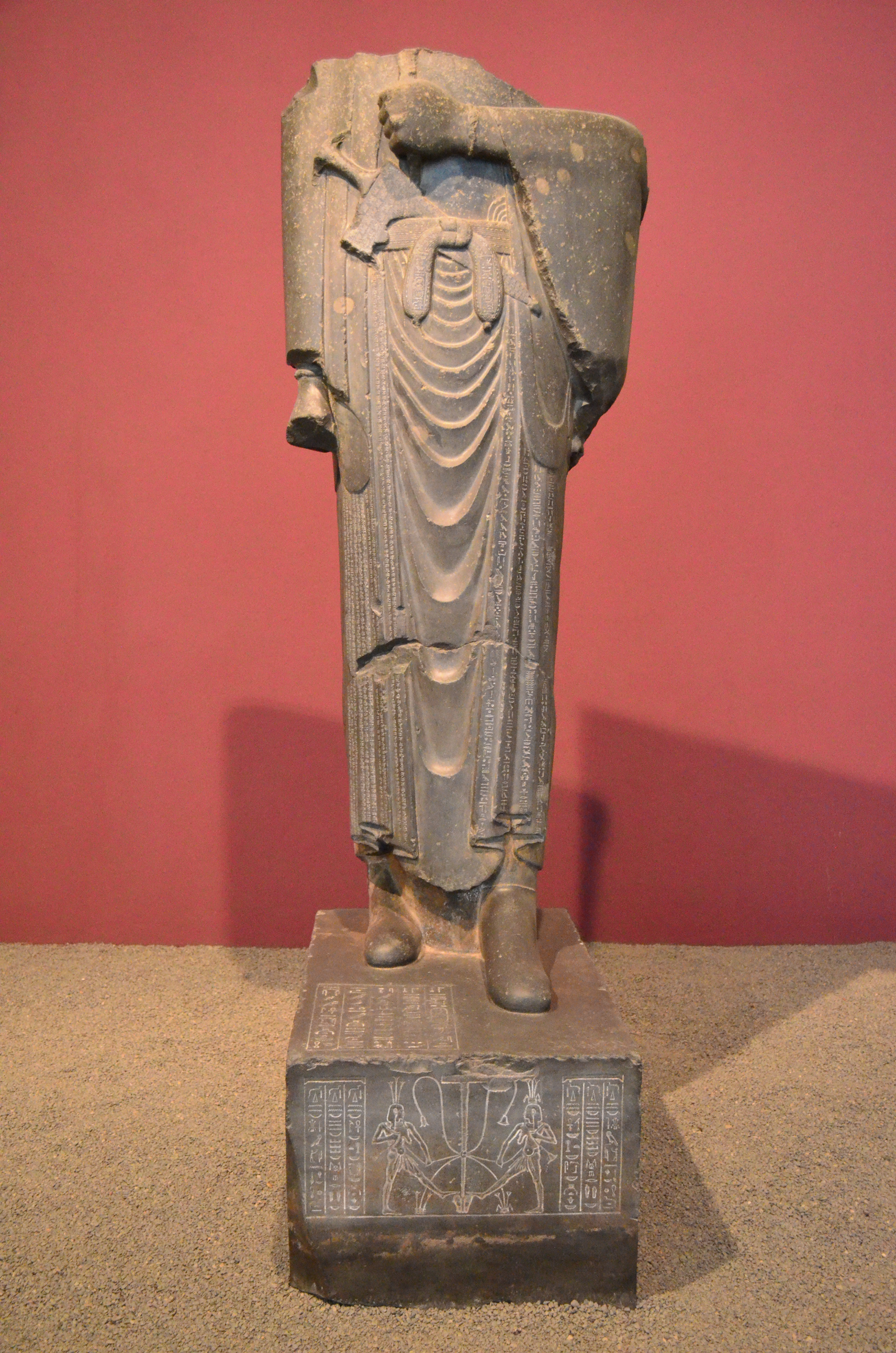
Statue of Darius the Great.

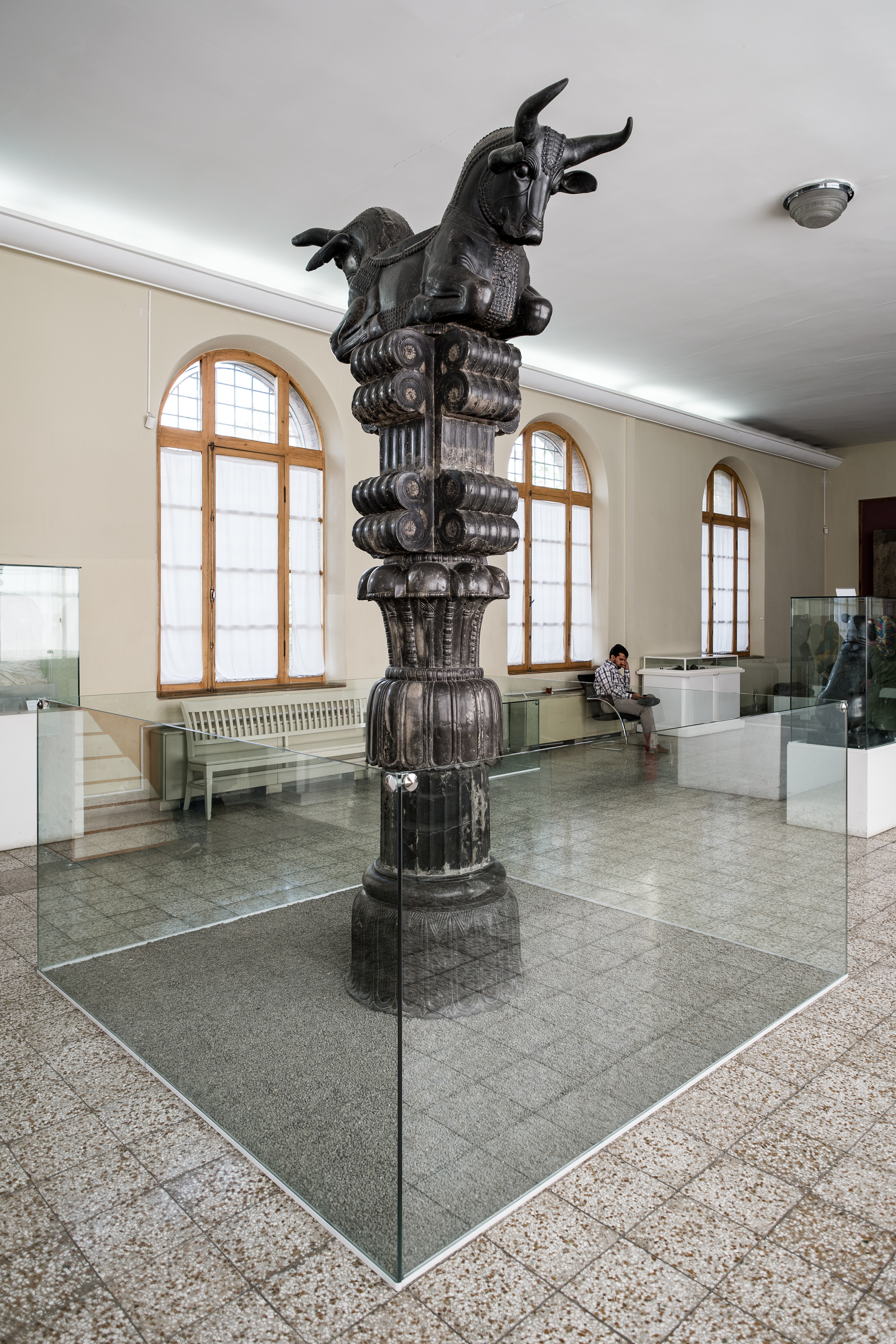
Column from Persepolis.

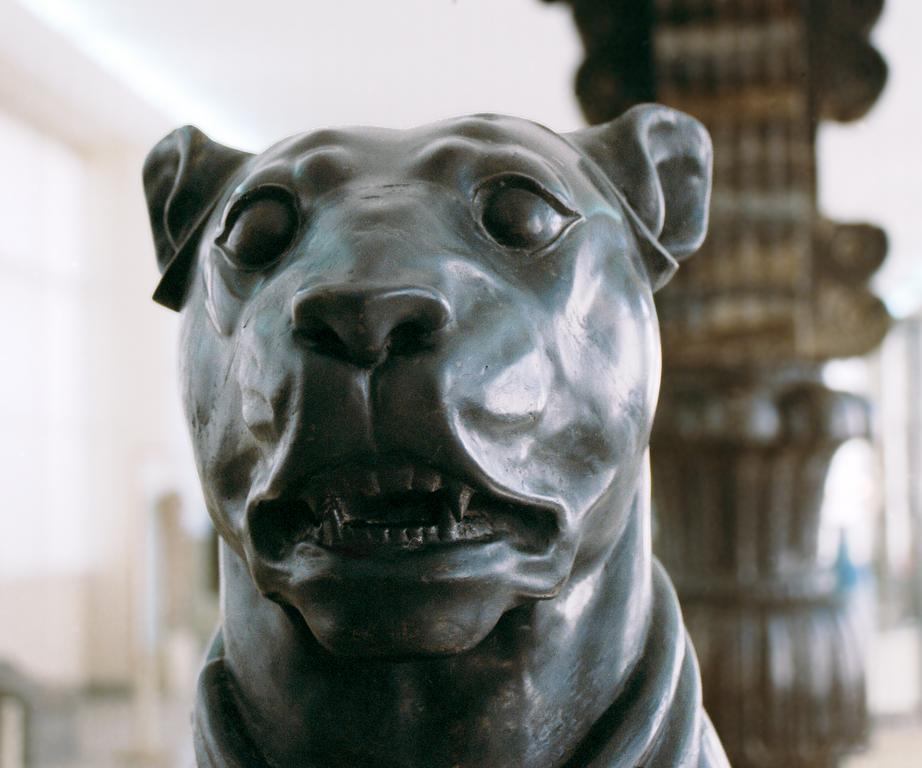
Achaemenid mastiff statue.

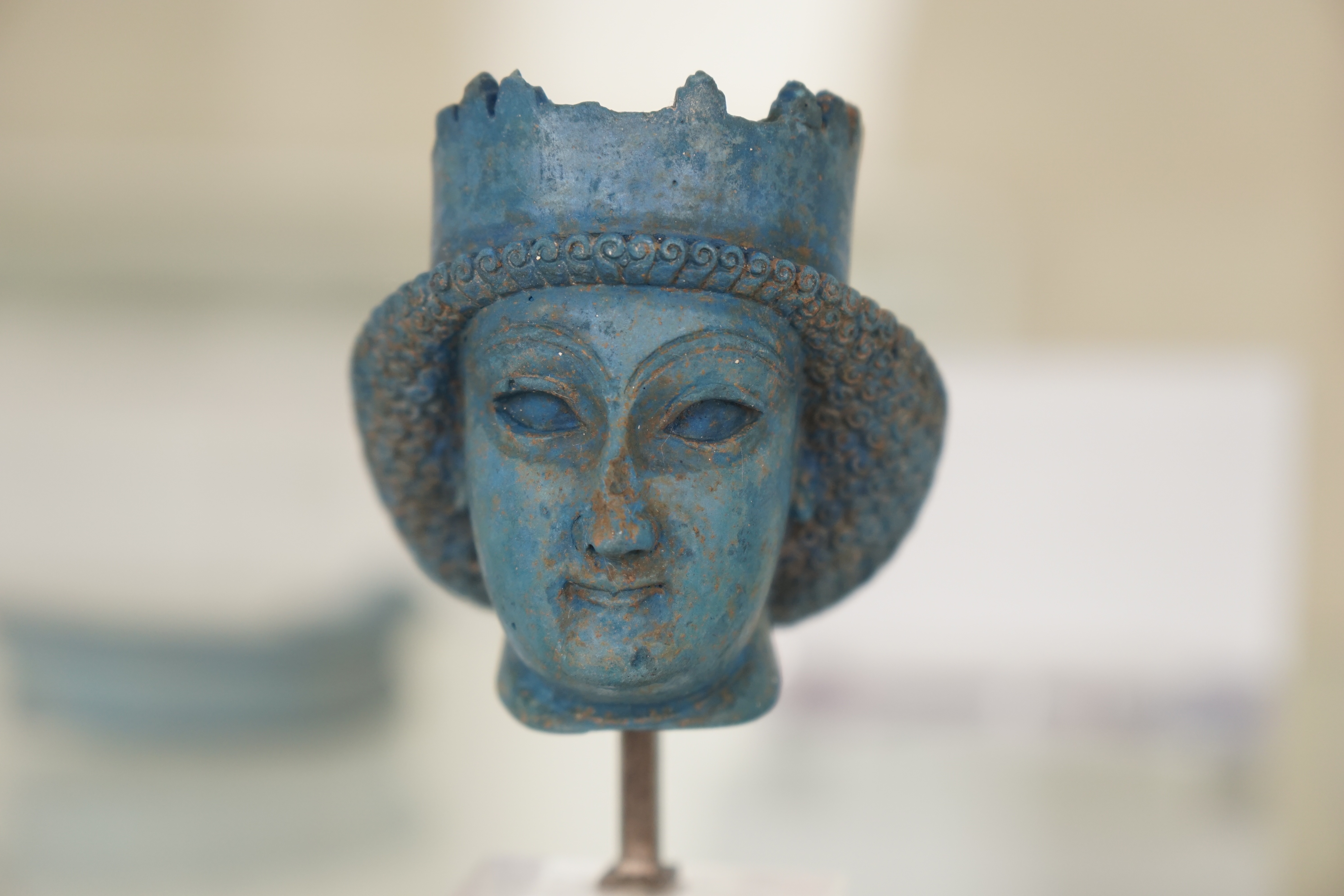
Statue of Empress Atossa, the daughter of Cyrus the Great, wife of Darius the Great, and mother of Xerxes the Great.

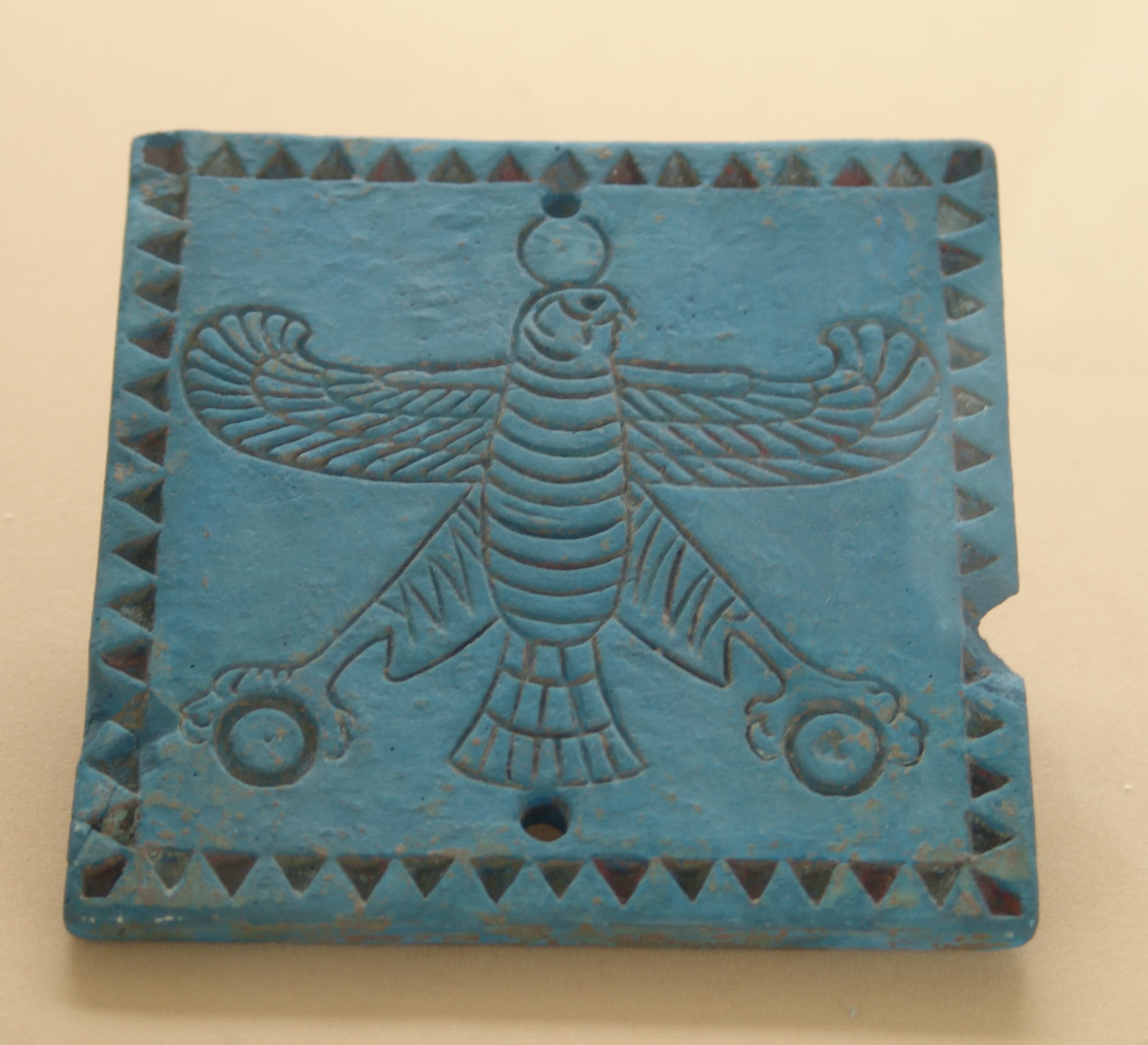
An Achaemenid plaque, the only remaining item with the symbol of the Empire's flag.

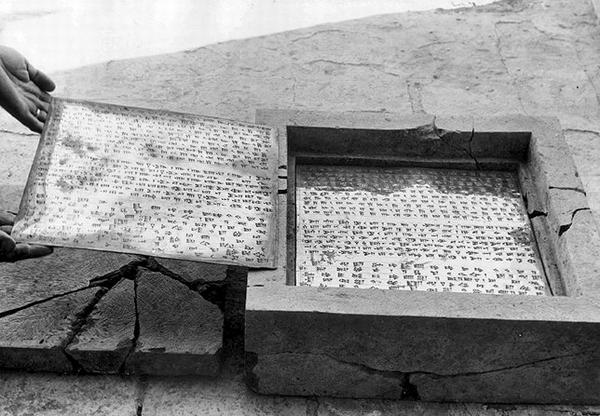
Tablets of Darius the Great, discovered at Persepolis, are housed at the museum with their original stone box.

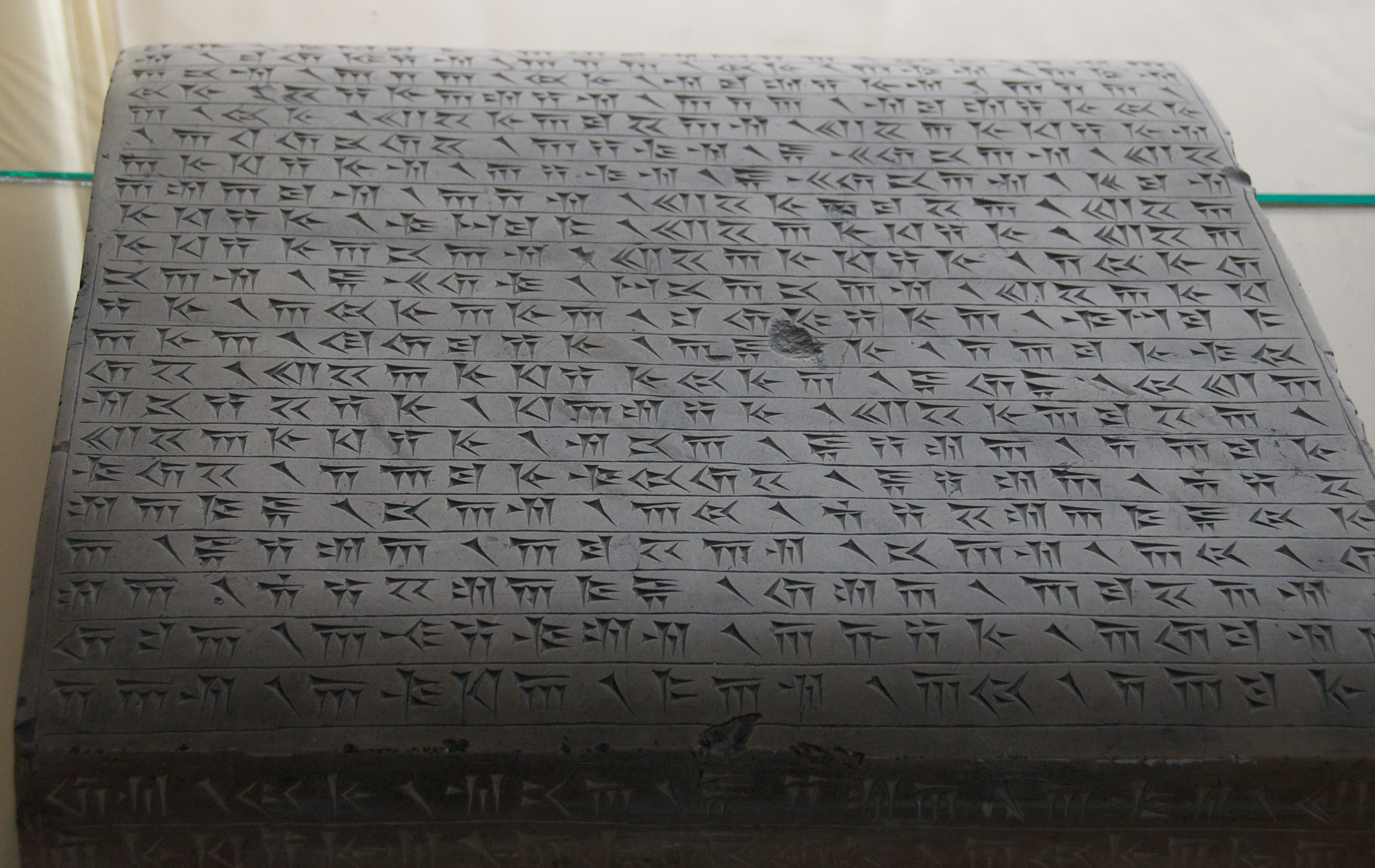
Tablet of Xerxes the Great

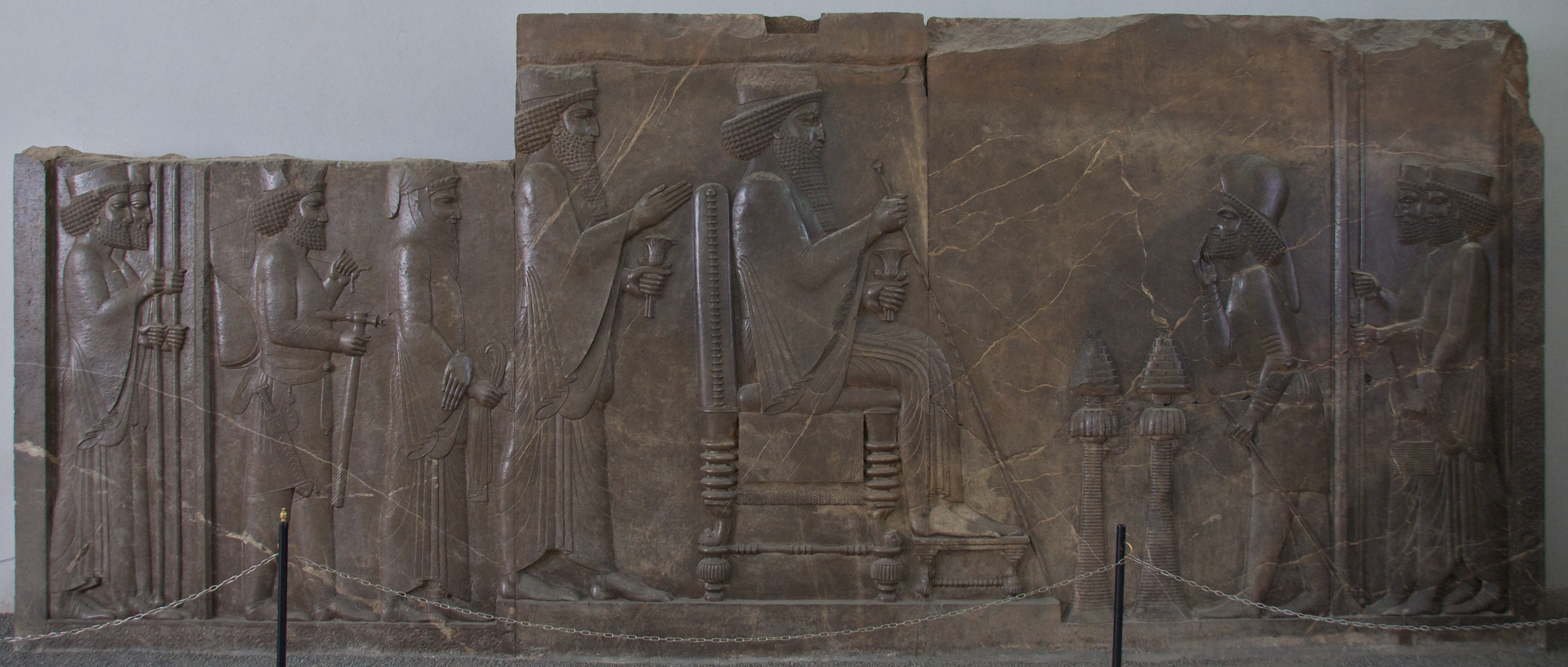
The central wall of the northern stairs of Apadana Palace from Persepolis.

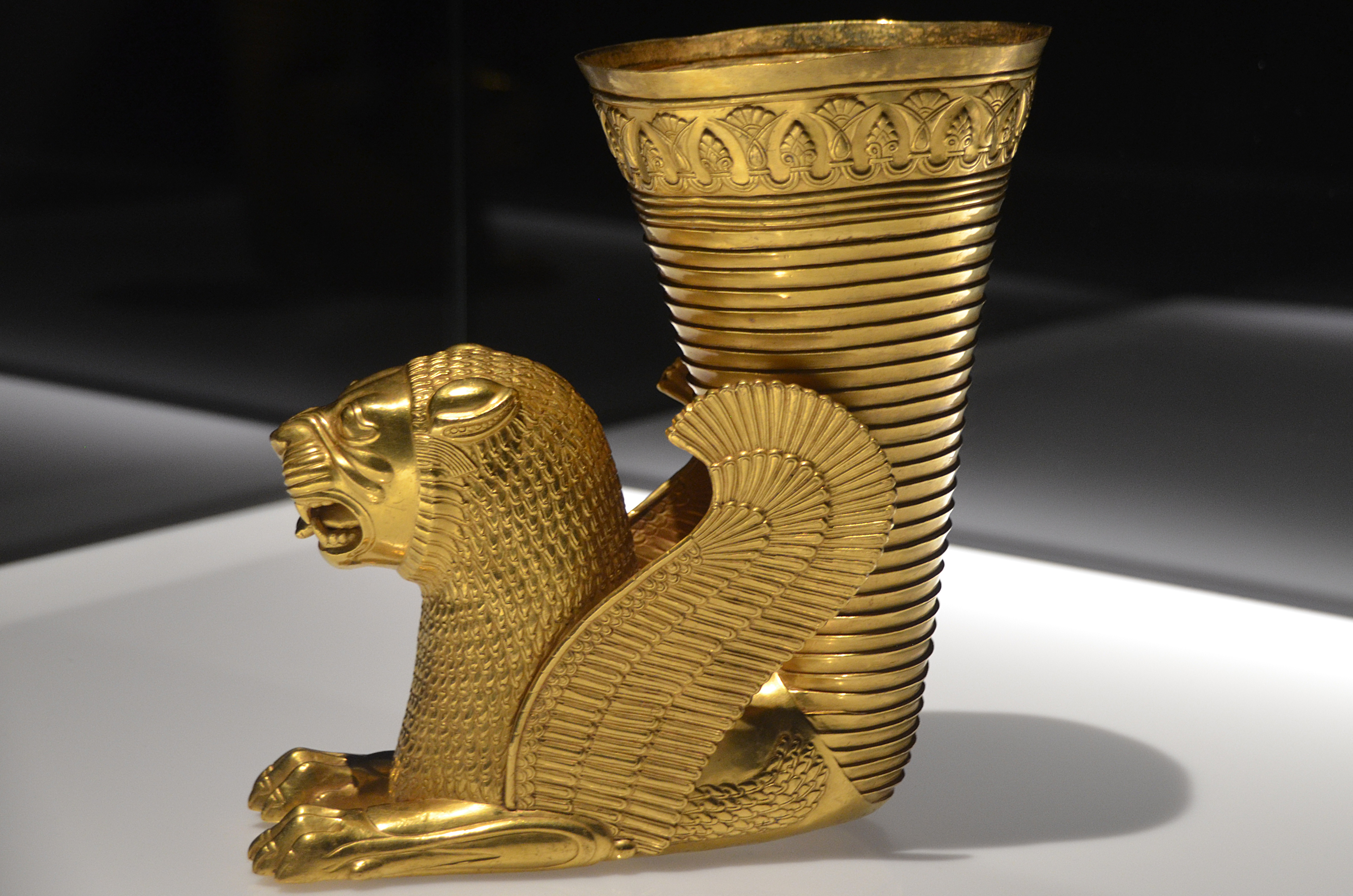
Achaemenid royal rhyton made of gold in the shape of a lion, from Ecbatana.

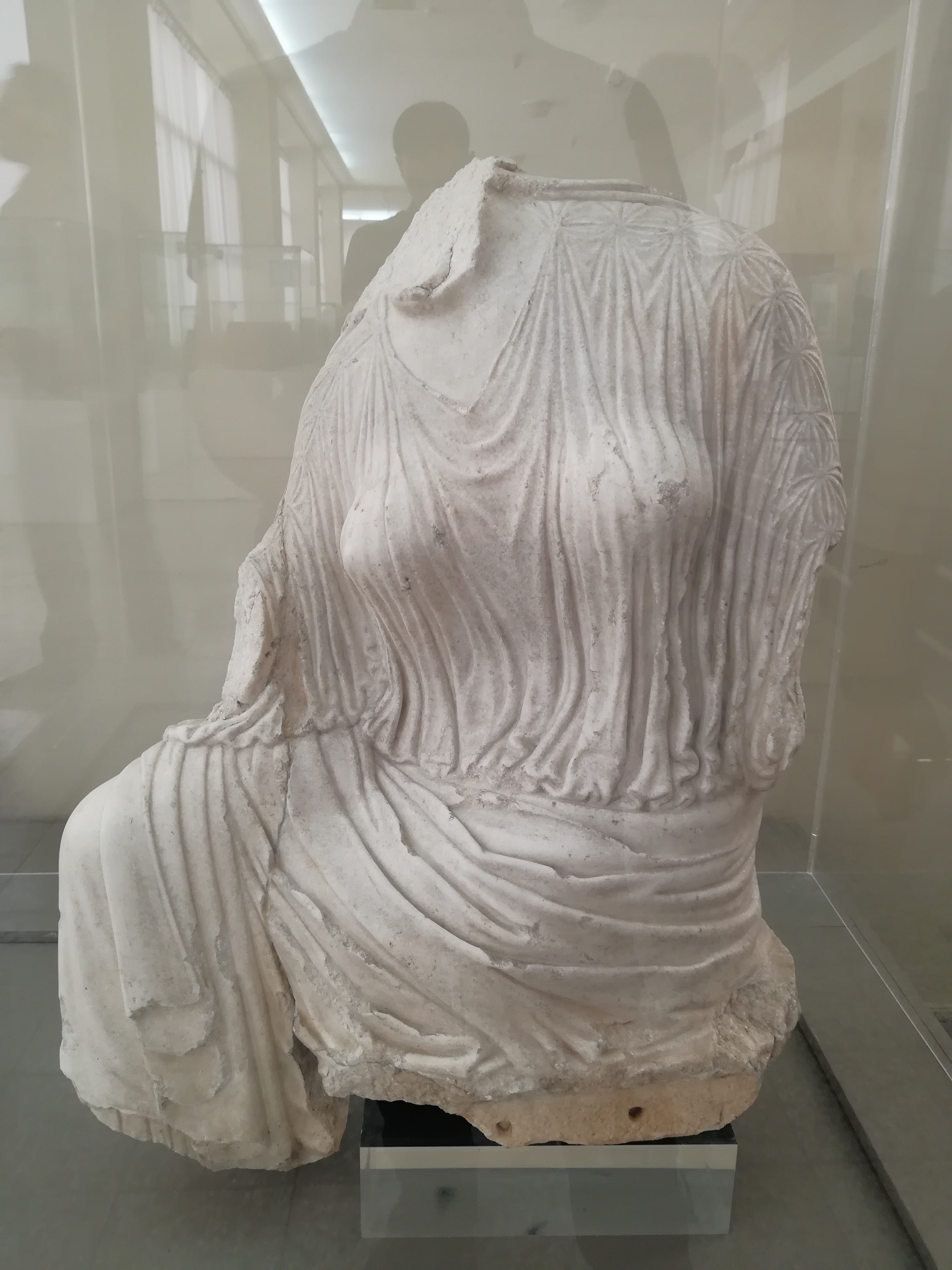
One of the world's four remaining statues of Penelope was discovered in Persepolis. The other three are kept at Vatican Museum and Capitoline Museum in Rome.

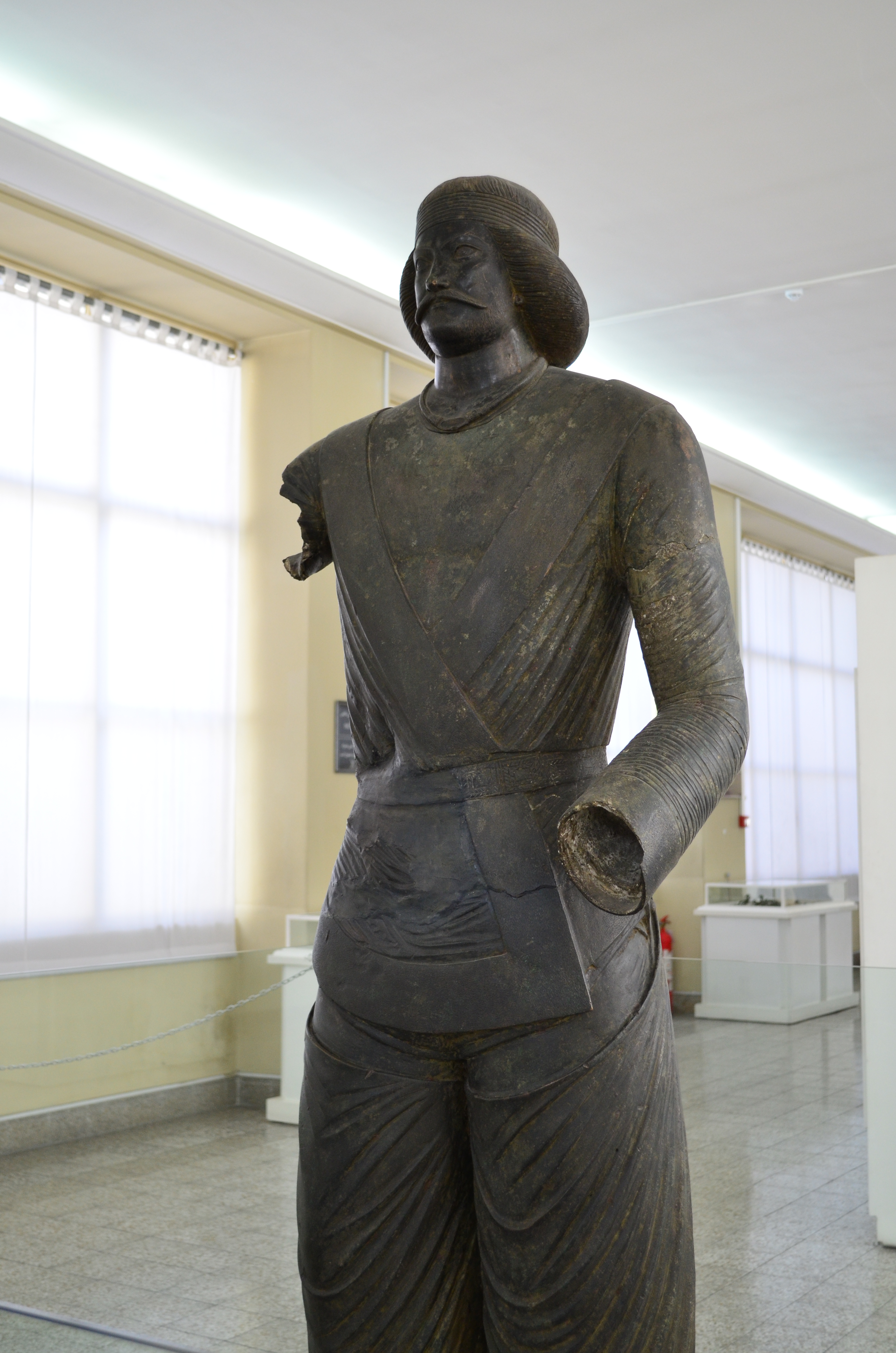
The Shami Statue.

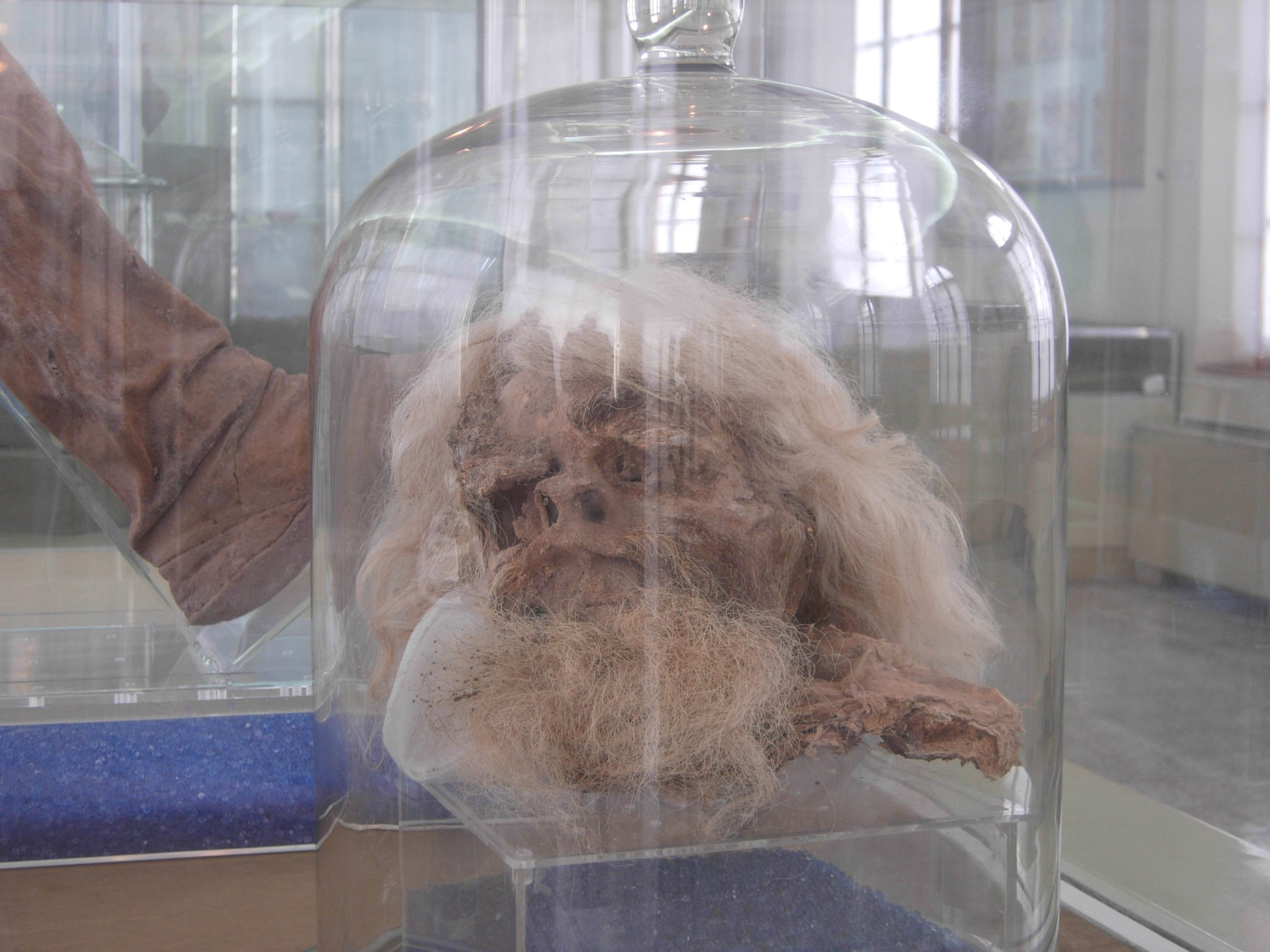
The Saltmen.

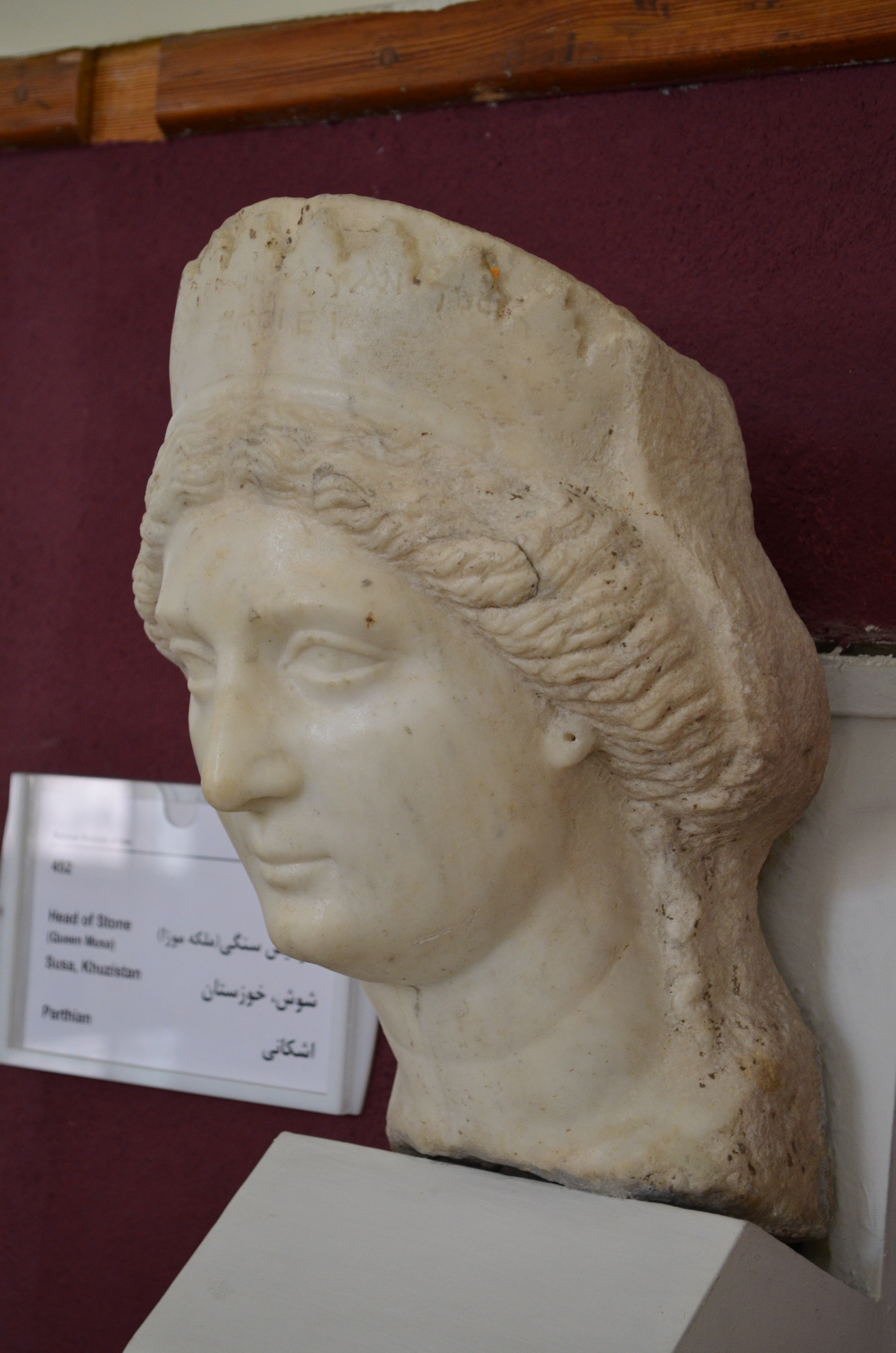
Statue of Thermusa.

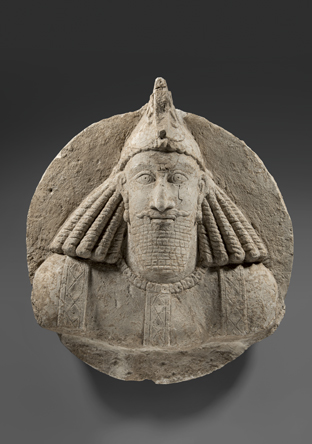
Statue of a Sassanid nobleman

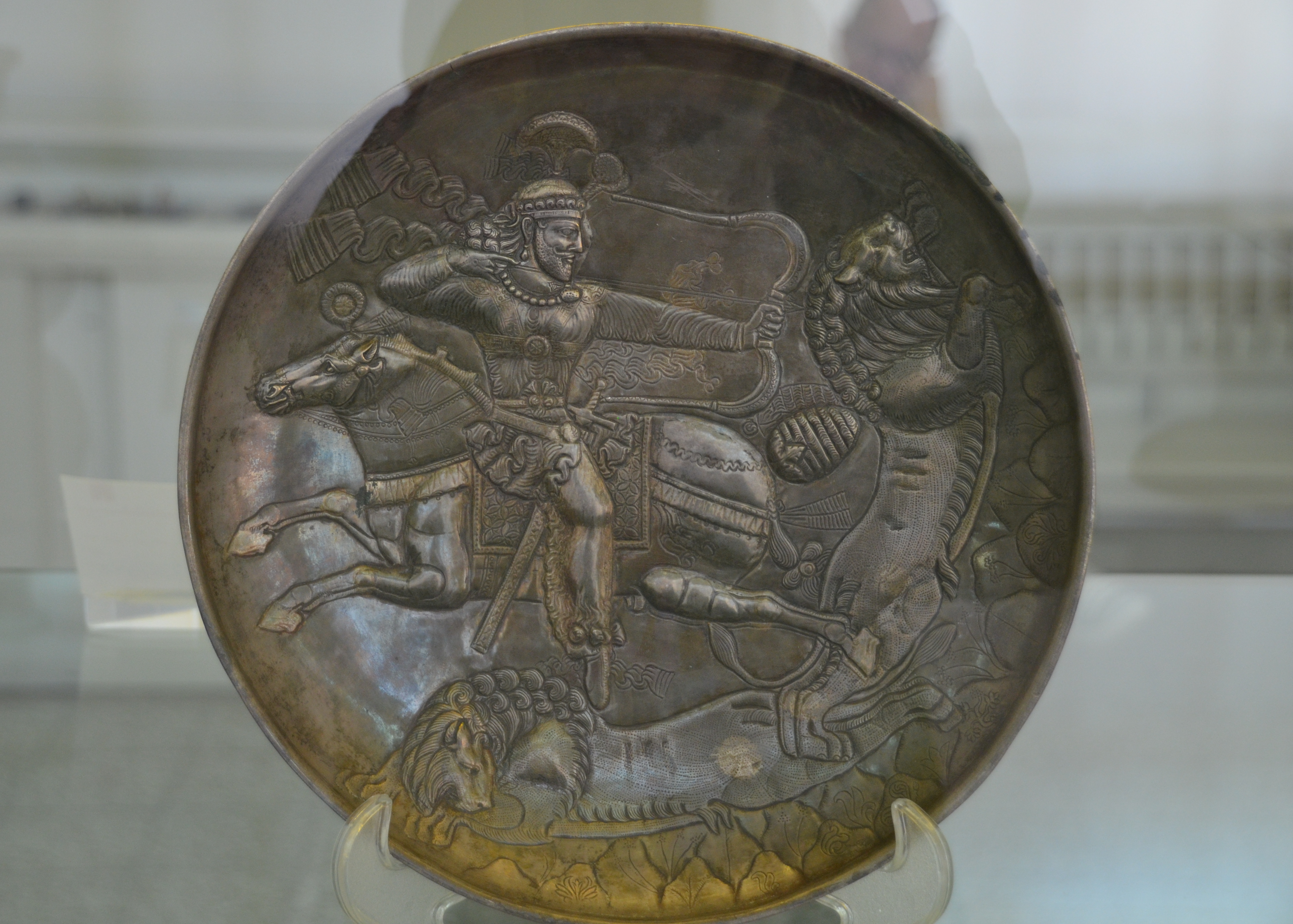
Royal silver plate with Sassanid king Shapur II hunting lions.

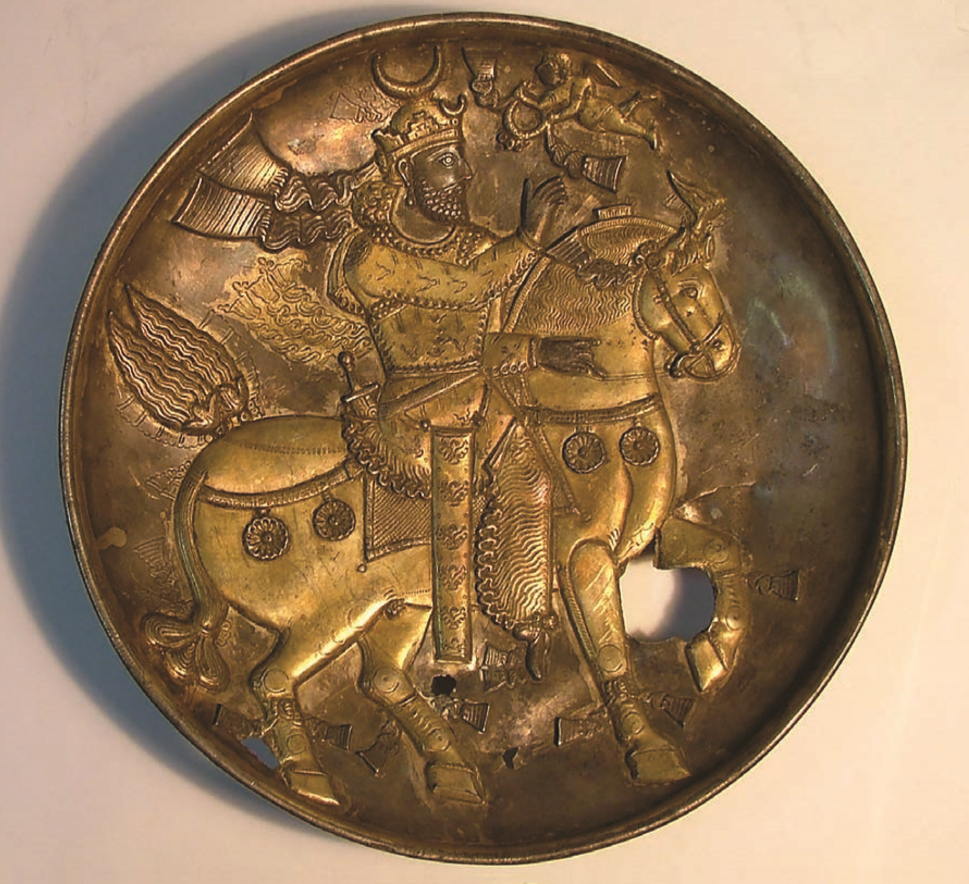
Royal plate of Sassanid king Khosrow I

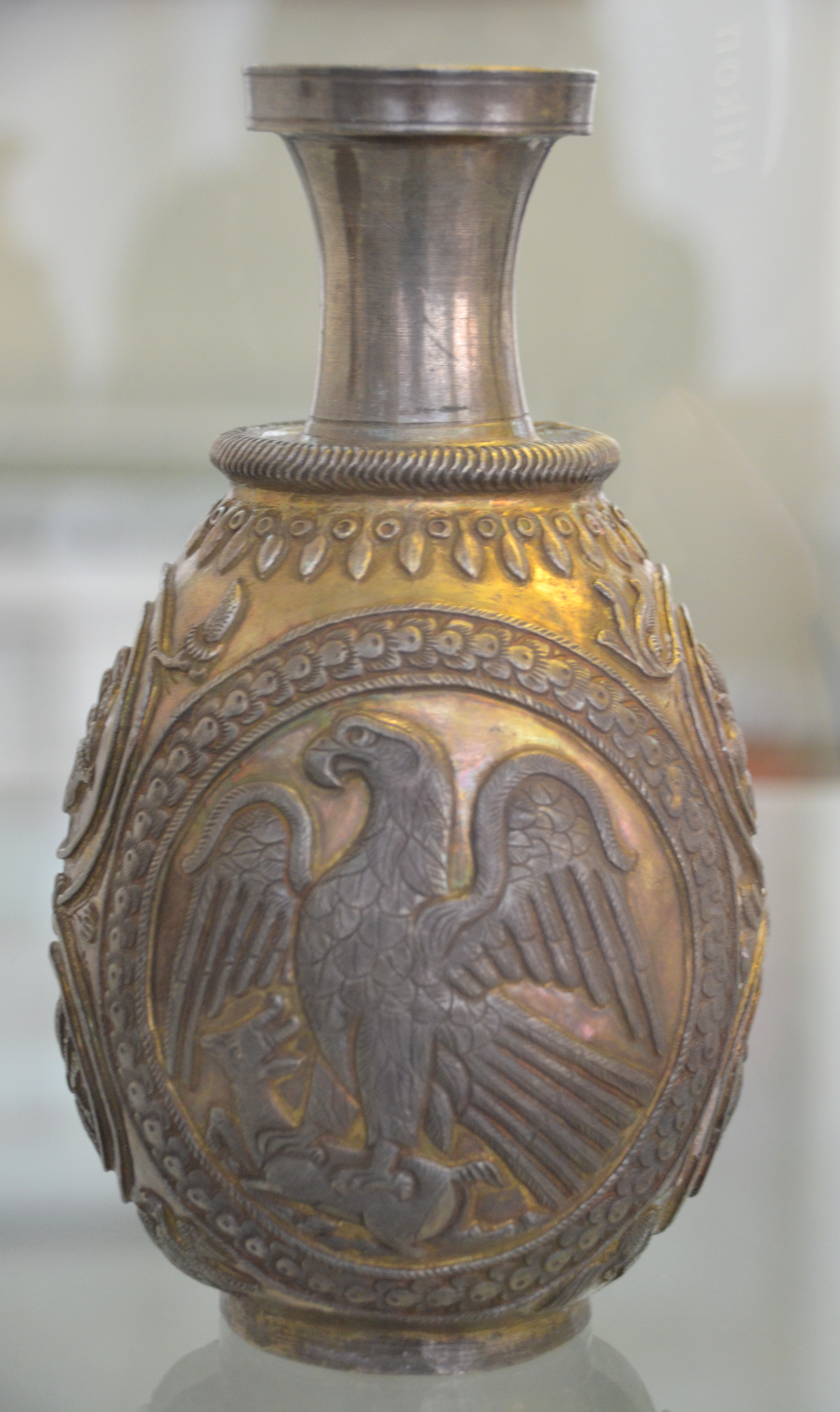
Royal Sassanid gilded silver vessel

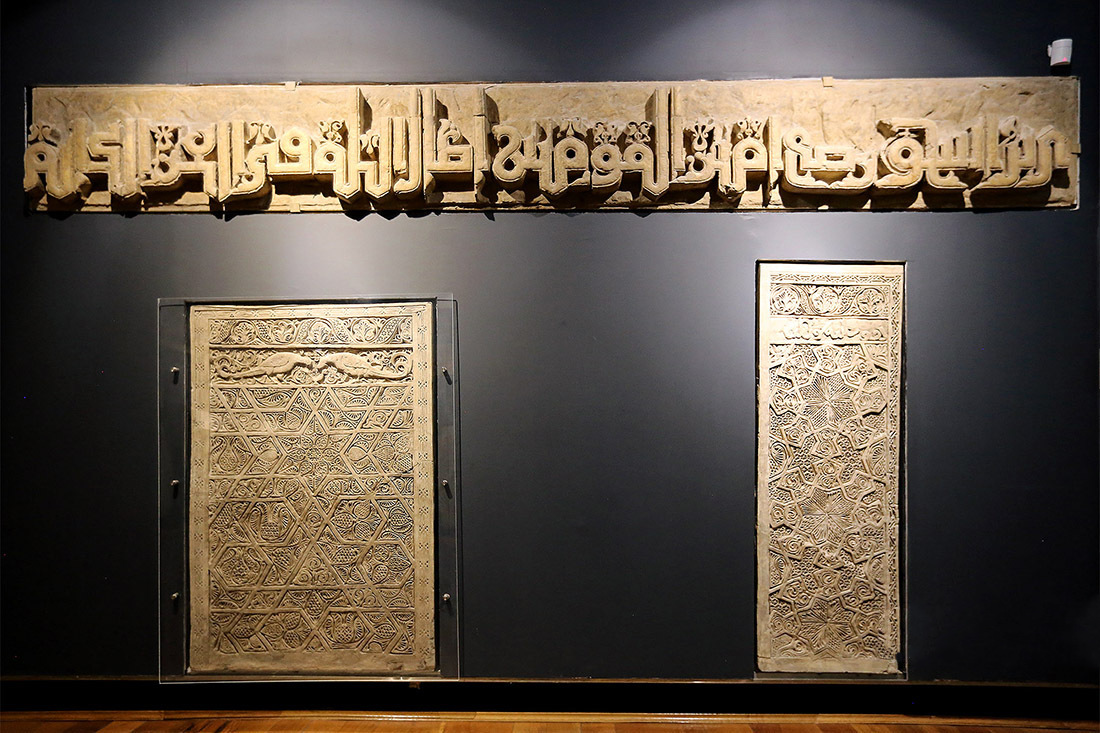
Early Islamic plasterwork

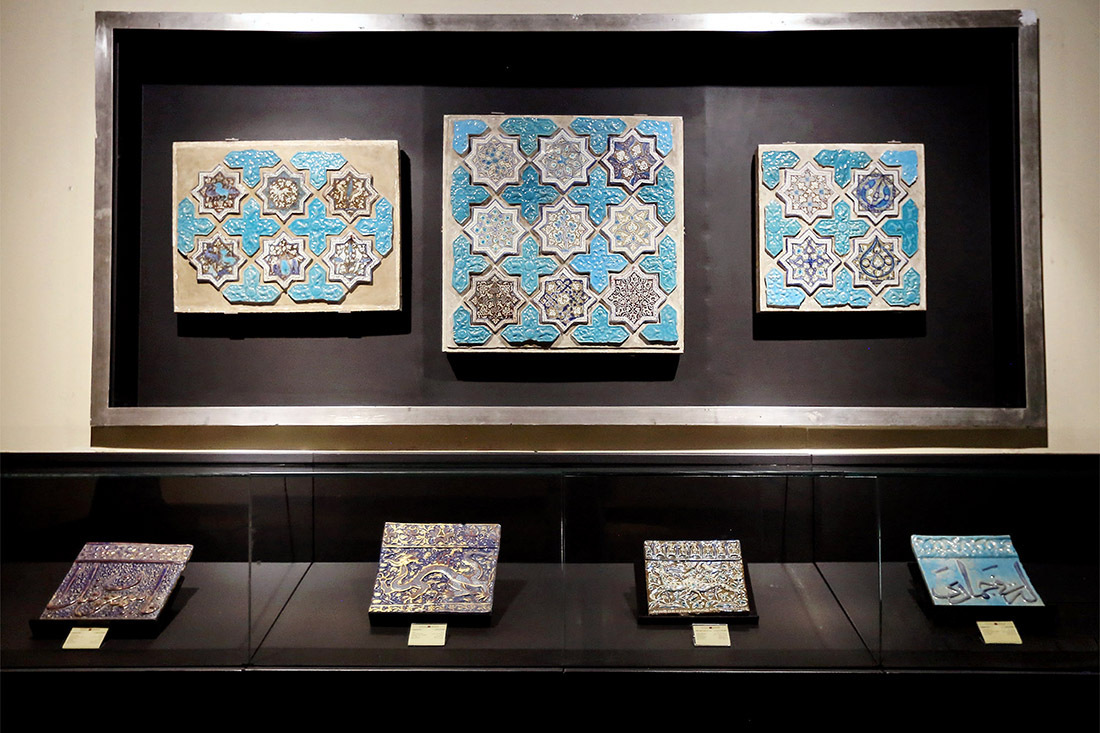
Early Islamic tiling

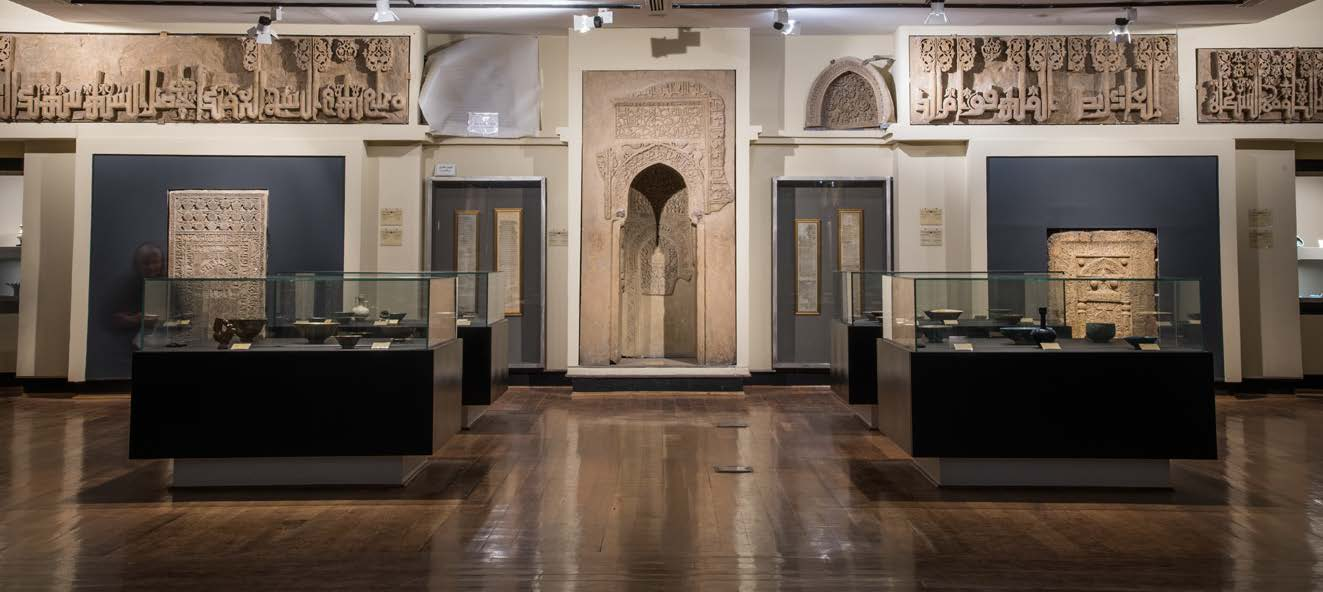
Part of the Seljuk gallery, which displays a Mihrab, plasterworks, and vessels.

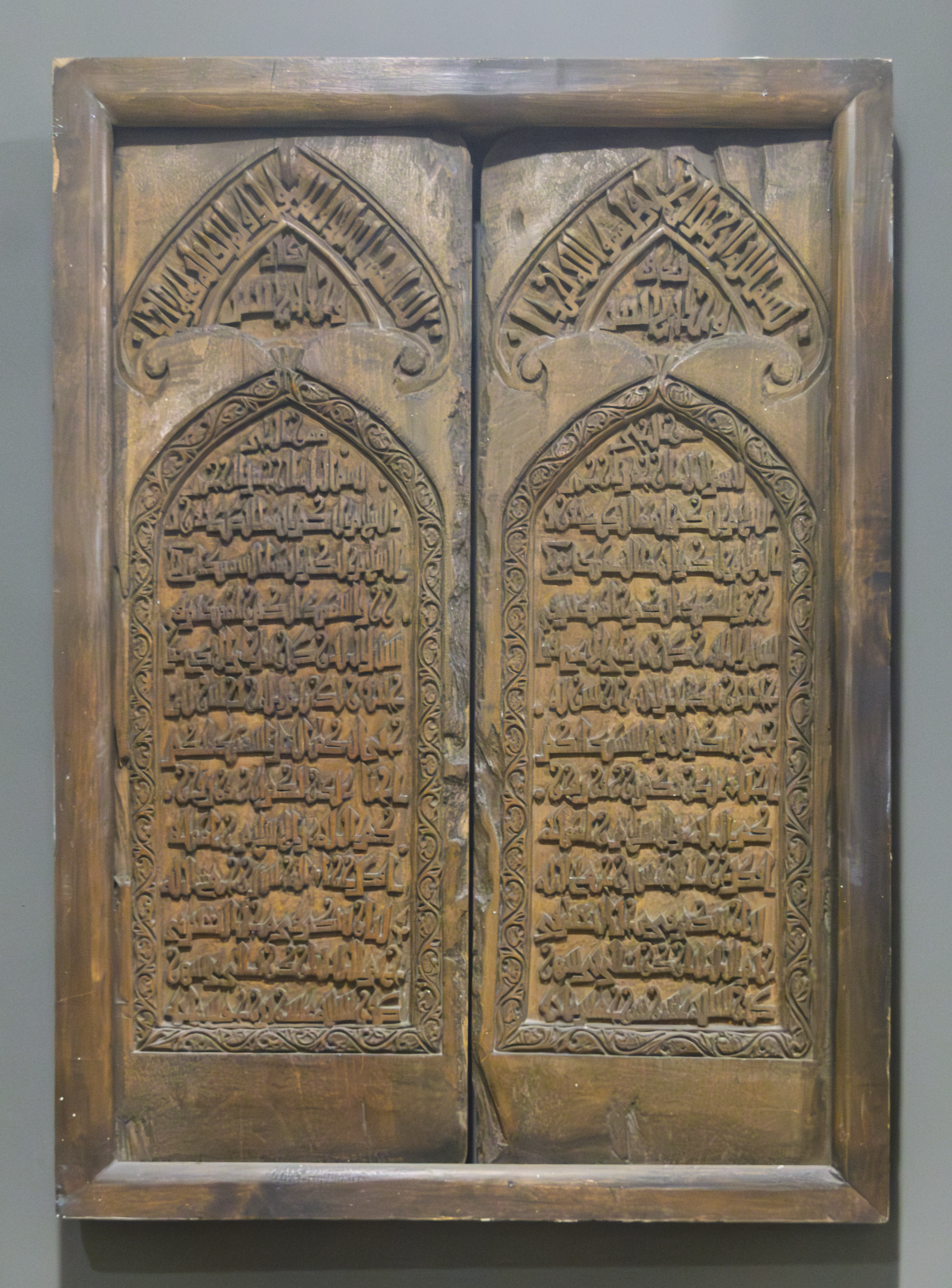
Wooden window, 1126 AD

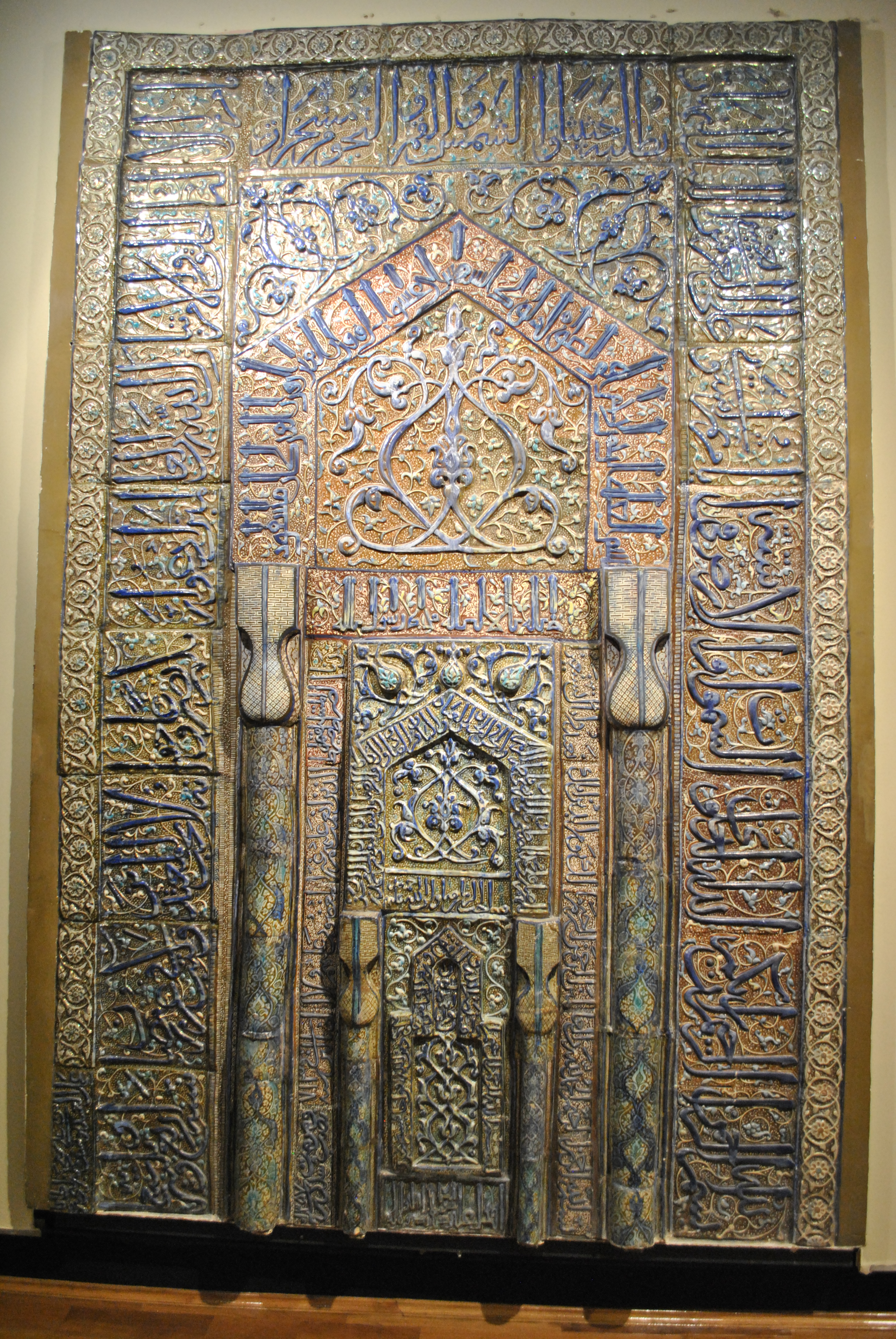
Paradise Gate, Mihrab from Ilkhanate Empire.

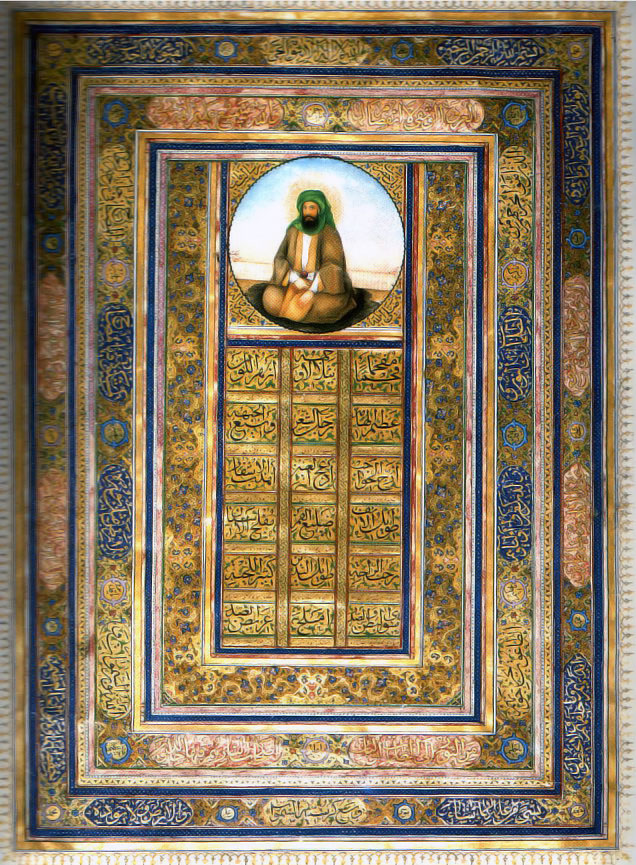
Depiction of Prophet Muhammad, Qajar era.

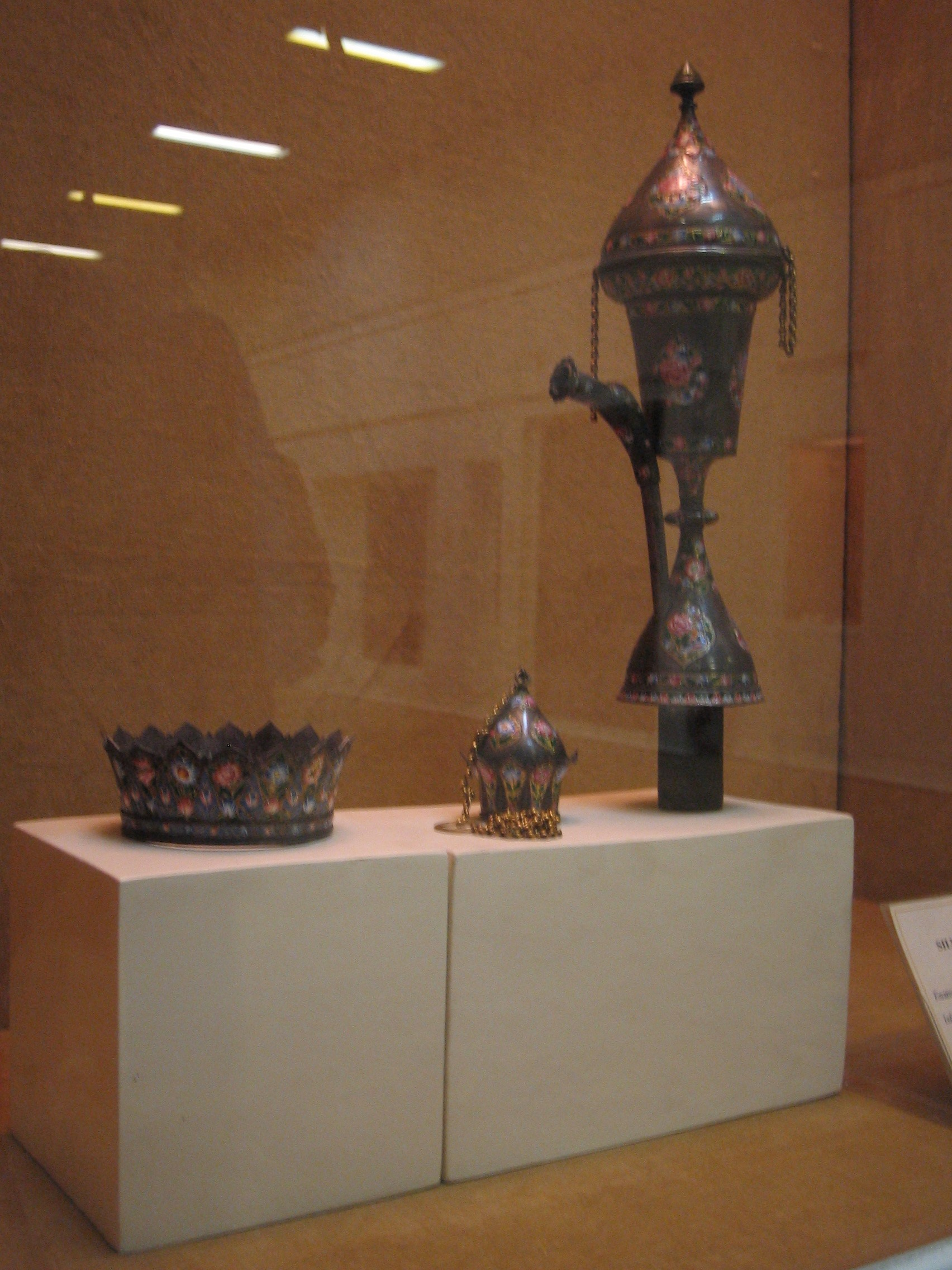
A Qajar-era hookah.

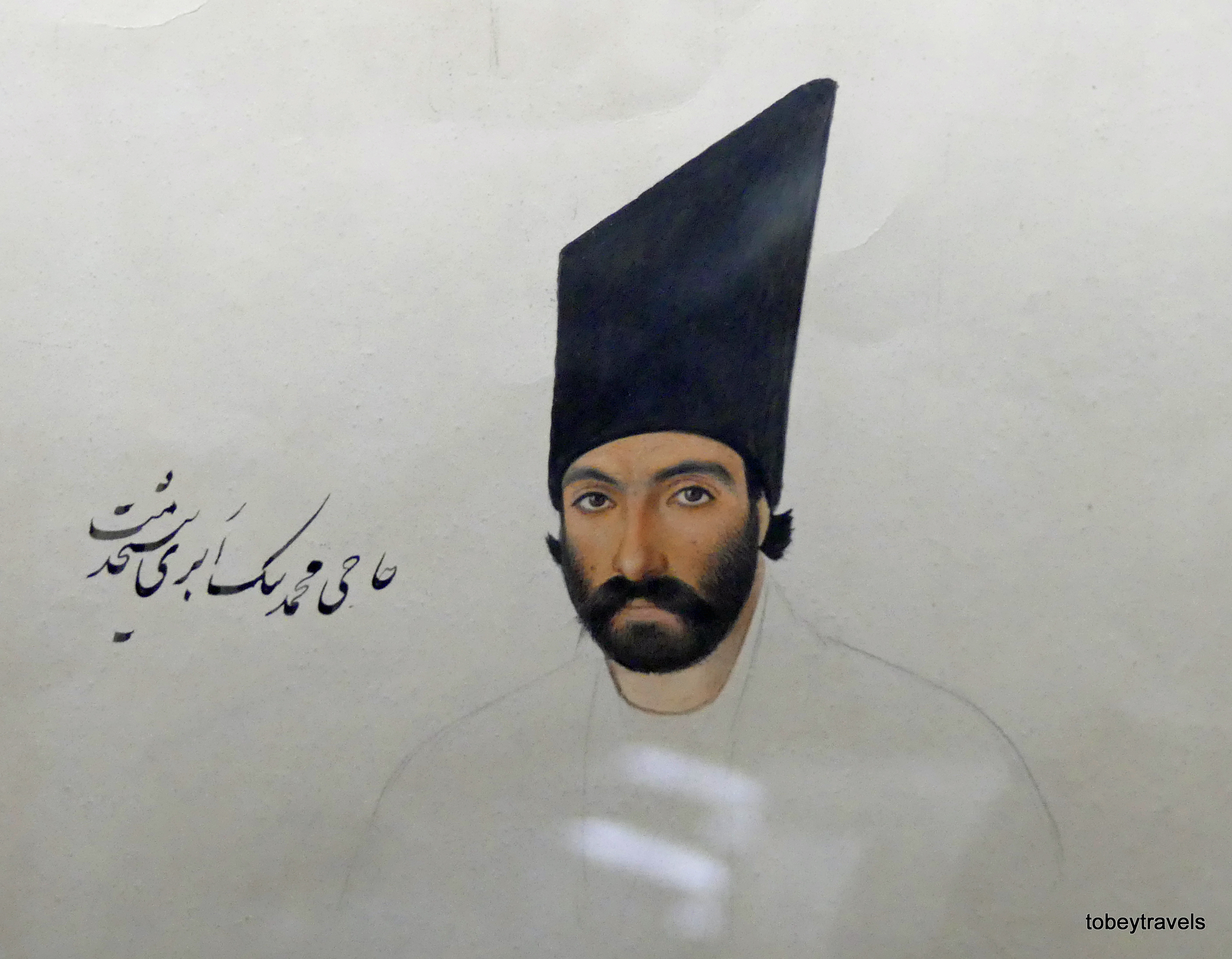
A 19th-century watercolor painting, Qajar era.

== See also ==
- Reza Abbasi Museum
- Tehran Museum of Contemporary Art
- List of museums in Iran
