= Amlash culture =

The term Amlash culture refers to an assortment of historic materials and periods in Gilan and west of Mazandaran, in north of Iran. Amlash refers to the geographical region from which some archeological objects of certain types come. It does not have any real archeological meaning when used with the word culture. These objects which are attributed to Amlaš have been shown in many exhibitions in Europe and the United States and may often be seen in catalogues.

Amlash, now a county in Gilan province, was a small village in southeastern Gilan in 1959. The name originates from the nearby Alborz valleys where archaeological artifacts were discovered during excavations. The artifacts range in date from the late second millennium BC through the Partho-Sasanian period, but most of the objects are dated to the 9th-8th centuries BC. Dating and meaning of the known objects (bronze weapons and animal figurines, human statuettes of terra cotta and bronze, pottery animal effigy vases, and burnished black, gray, or orange pottery vessels) is complicated by insufficient archaeological contexts.

== Gallery ==
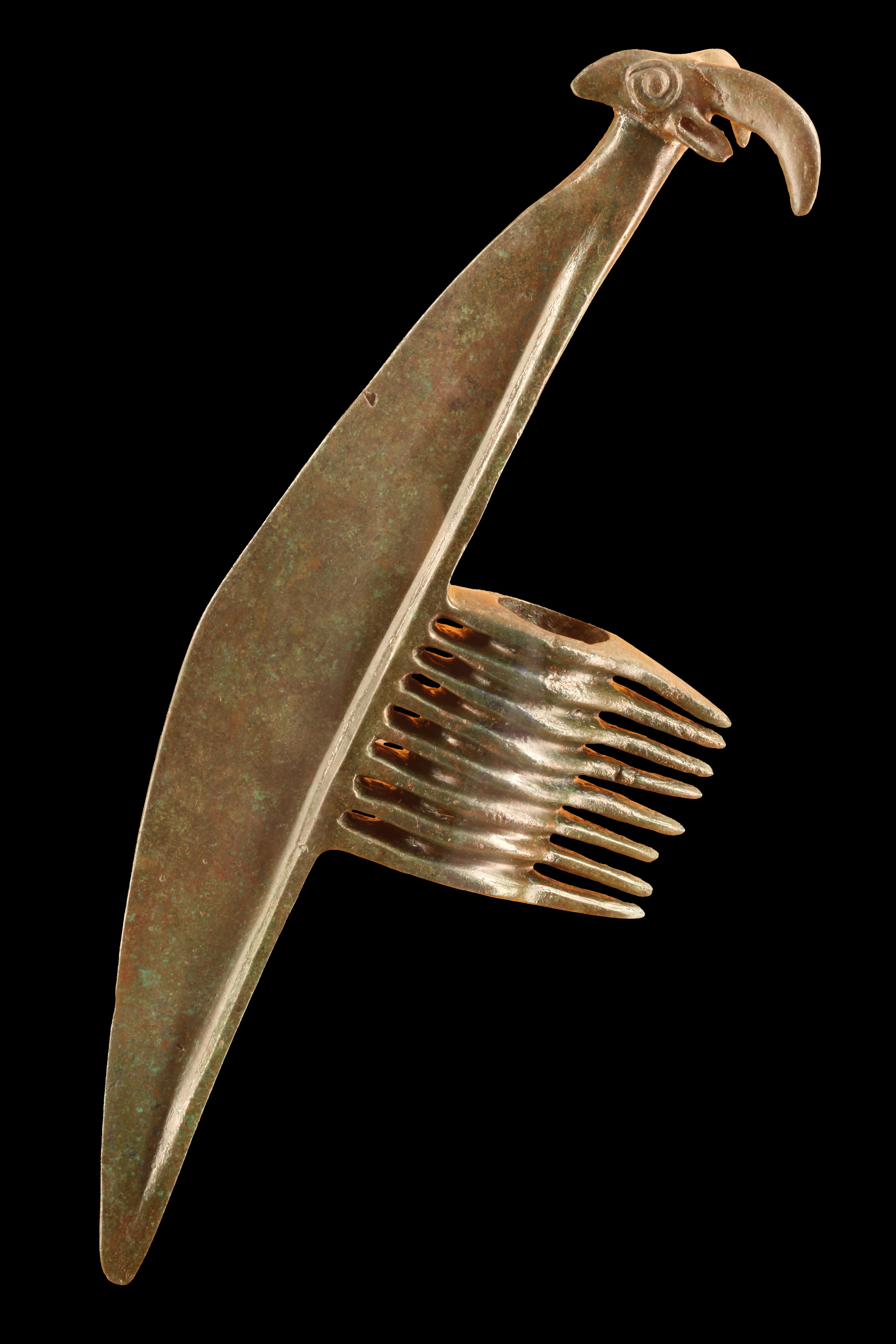
Halberd-axe head with the head of a mouflon. Luristan bronze, late 2nd millennium–early 1st millennium BC. From Amlash, Iran.

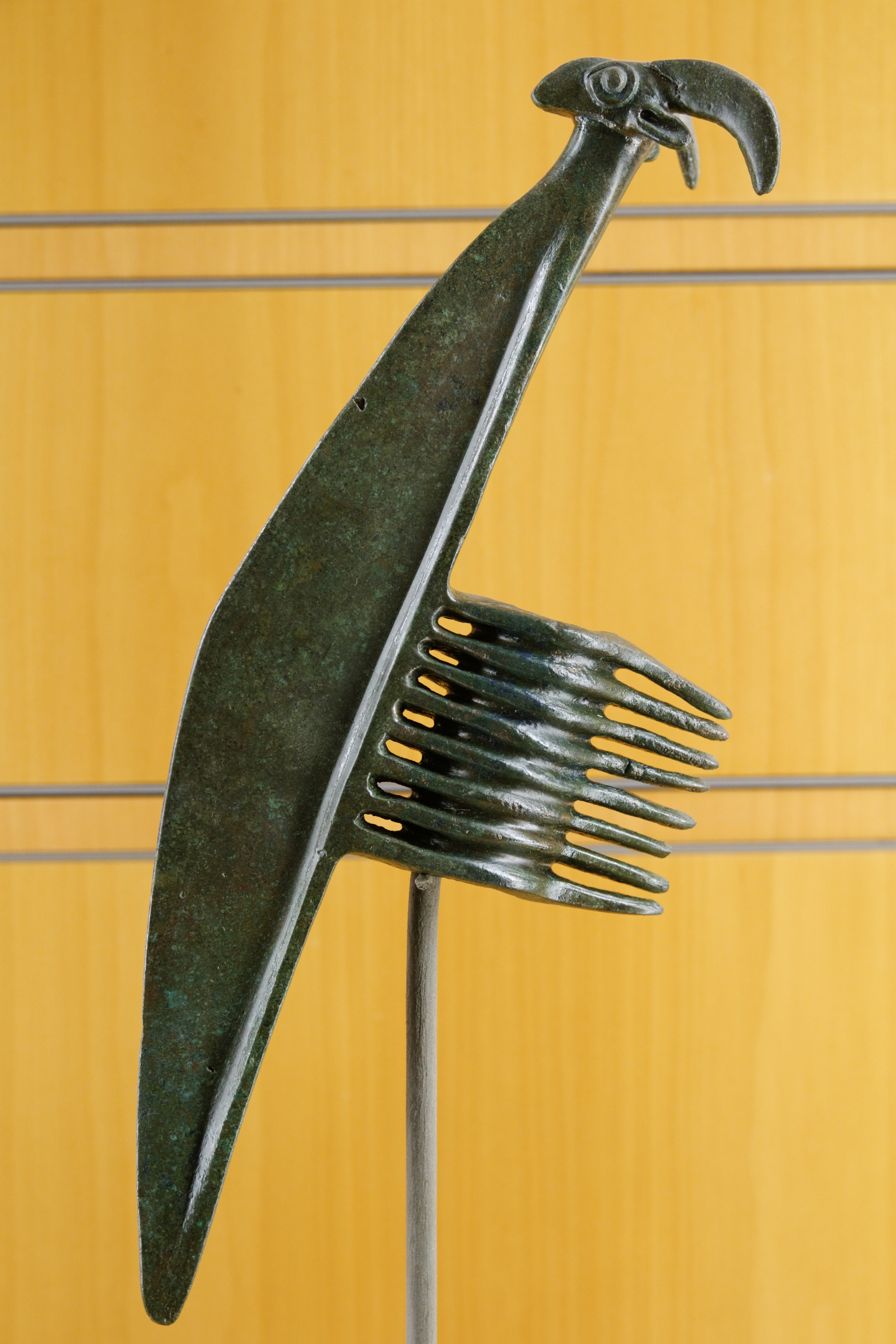
Halberd-axe head with the head of a mouflon. Luristan bronze, late 2nd millennium–early 1st millennium BC. From Amlash, Iran.

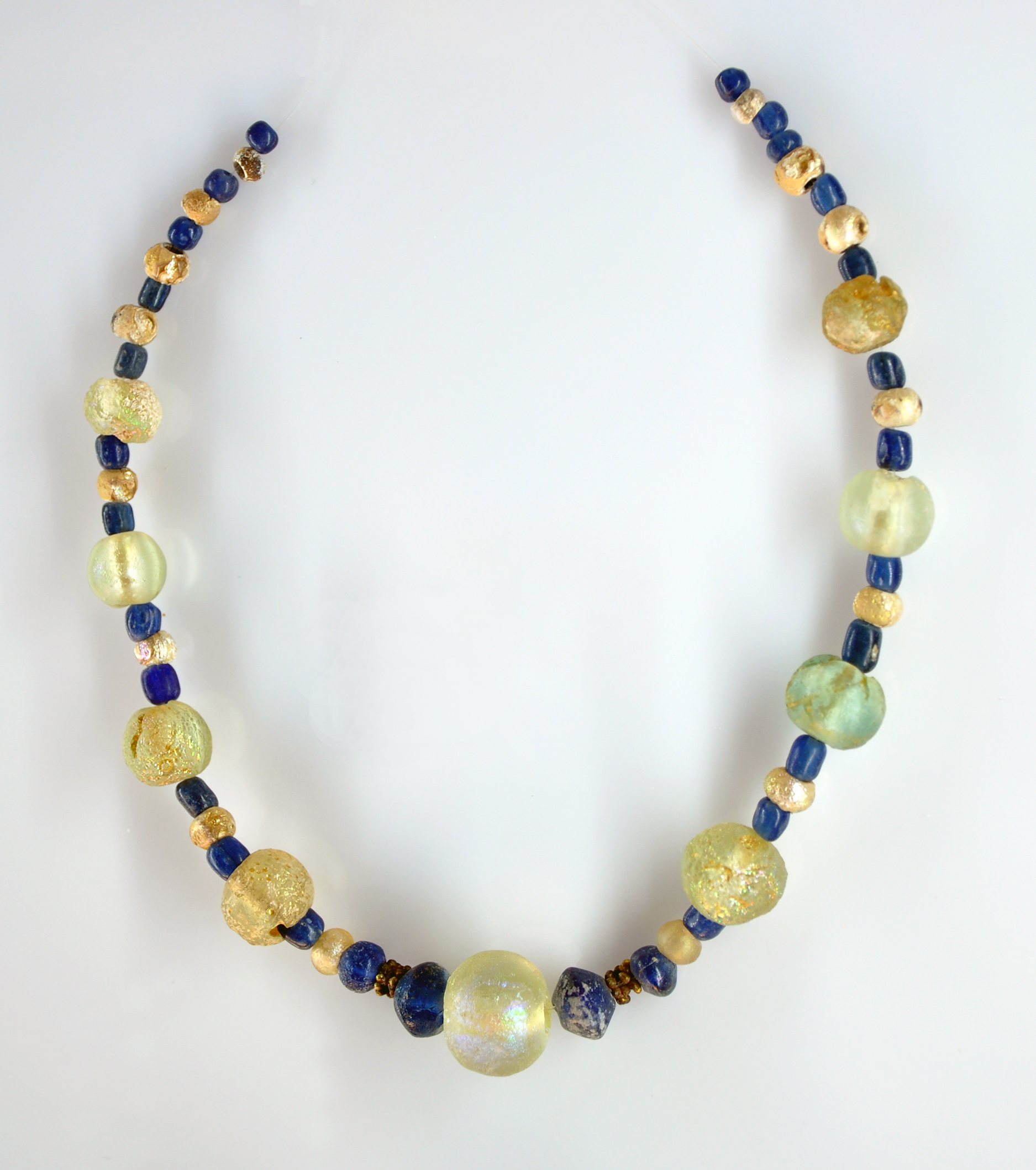
Glass bead necklace, Amlash, Iran, 10th - 8th century - JC (?), Ramat-Abad excavations. Royal Museums of Art and History, Decorative Arts section, Parc du Cinquantenaire, Brussels.
