= List of museums in Tehran =

List of museums located in capital of Iran: Tehran

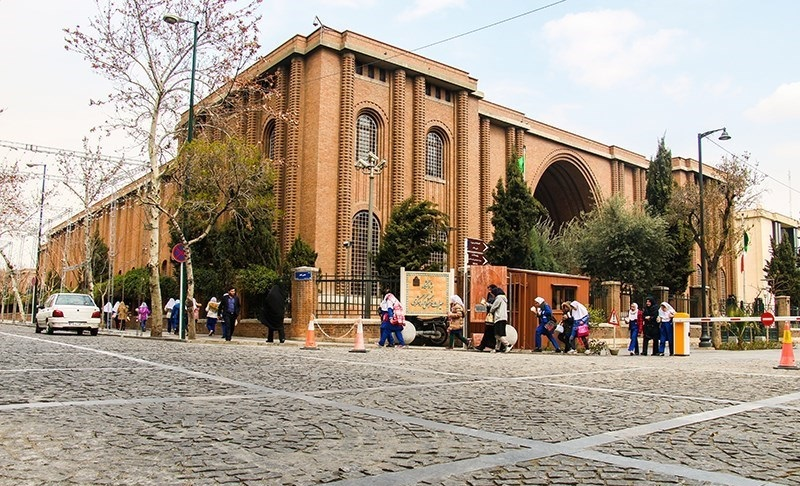
Museum of Ancient Iran in 30th Tir St. Tehran, Iran.

This is a list of museums in Tehran, the capital city of Iran. Some of museums located in Tehran, have national and international importance. There are a number of large museums in Tehran that deal with a wide range of subjects. For example, the National Museum of Iran is distinguished in Iranian archeology, the Carpet Museum of Iran exhibits the art of Iranian carpet weaving, and the Tehran Museum of Contemporary Art preserves the works of international artists.

== List ==
Name of the museum	Native name	Details
Abgineh Museum of Tehran	موزهٔ آبگینه و سفالینه‌های ایران	It was registered as one of the national heritage of Iran on 27 April 1998. The Abgineh Museum is a specialized museum of glass and earthenware.
Ferdows Garden	باغ فردوس	Several historical mansions and the Museum of Iranian Cinema are located in this place.
Holy Defense Museum	موزه ملی انقلاب اسلامی و دفاع مقدس	Architect: Zhila Noroozi. About the concepts of the history of the Islamic Revolution and the Holy Defense.
Negarestan Palace	باغ موزه نگارستان	Negarestan: Garden and Museum of University of Tehran with several cultural complexes.
Museum of the Qasr Prison	باغ‌موزه قصر	The former Qasr prison and was the first centralized prison in Tehran.
Vaziri's Garden and Museum	باغ‌موزه وزیری	Builder: Naser Hooshmand Vaziri. This museum is the first private museum cave in Iran.
Dafineh Museum	تماشاگه پول, موزه دفینه	Dafineh Museum or Money Watch Center is the first specialized and permanent museum of coins and banknotes in Iran.
History Museum of Tehran	تماشاگه تاریخ	Watch center of history; Contemporary history of Iran, Personal utensils of Naser al-Din Shah Qajar, Paintings by Kamal-ol-molk, etc.
Time Museum (Hossein Khodadad House)	تماشاگه زمان, موزه ساعت	Also known as the "Museum of the Clock", registered as one of the national heritage of Iran on 22 January 2004.
Treasury of National Jewels	موزه جواهرات ملی ایران	The national jewelry of Iran is in the treasury of the Central Bank of Iran and is also used as a museum.
Towhid Prison	زندان کمیته مشترک ضدخرابکاری	During the Pahlavi era, it was the Temporary Police Prison, the Women's Prison, and later the Anti-sabotage Joint Committee Prison of SAVAK. Nowaday called Ebrat Museum (Museum of Edification).
Green Museum Palace	کاخ شهوند, کاخ‌موزه سبز	Shahvand Palace, now called the Green Museum Palace, was the residence of Reza Shah from 1929 onwards.
Sahebgheranieh Palace	کاخ صاحبقرانیه	Founded by the order of Naser al-Din Shah Qajar. This palace has a cinematic reputation and several TV series and movies have been filmed here.
Golestan Palace	کاخ موزه گلستان	With a history of over 440 years, the history of this palace dates back to the time of Abbas the Great.
Niavaran Complex	کاخ نیاوران, کاخ موزه نیاوران	It was the summer residence of Mohammad Reza Pahlavi. Nowaday one of the tourist attractions of Tehran.
Sa'dabad Complex	کاخ‌موزه سعدآباد, مجموعه فرهنگی - تاریخی سعدآباد	It has gone through four historical periods of Qajar, first Pahlavi and second Pahlavi and the Iranian revolution. After the Revolution of 1979, the complex became a museum, but the current presidential palace is located next to it.
Private library of the Niavaran Complex	کتابخانه اختصاصی کاخ نیاوران, کتابخانه اختصاصی فرح پهلوی	Farah Pahlavi Private Library, adjacent to the residence of the Pahlavi dynasty was built in 1976 on two floors and a basement on the east side of Niavaran Complex.
Malek National Museum and Library	کتابخانه و موزه ملی ملک	Malek National Library and Museum Institute is the first endowed-private museum in Iran and one of the six largest libraries in the country with the subject of manuscripts in Tehran.
Ahmad Shahi Pavilion	کوشک احمدشاهی	It is located in Niavaran Complex next to the main palace where Mohammad Reza Pahlavi's family lived. It was built in the late Qajar period as Ahmad Shah Qajar's summer residence in the Niavaran Garden with an area of 800 meters and two floors.
Abkar Museum	موزه آبکار	Abkar Museum, which was known as Leila Pahlavi Palace before the Islamic revolution, is one of the not so old buildings of Sa'dabad Complex. Leila Pahlavi was the last child of Mohammad Reza Shah, who left the country at the age of 9 with her family, and her palace was turned into a museum after the revolution under the auspices of the Ministry of Cultural Heritage, Handicrafts and Tourism.
Museum of Natural Heritage and Wildlife of Iran	موزه آثار طبیعی و حیات وحش ایران, موزه حیات وحش دارآباد	Its location was one of the palaces of Fatemeh Pahlavi, which was built for guests but was never used, and after the revolution, with changes for public use, it became a museum focused on the nature of Iran. This museum was inaugurated in 1993 by the Municipality of Tehran in order to acquaint citizens with cultural and natural heritage and to recognize the importance of protecting the environment and wildlife.
Azadi Museum	موزه آزادی	It is located inside the Azadi Tower and it displays various objects from the Achaemenid, Parthian, Sasanian and Islamic periods, such as Earthenware, bronze vessels, paintings and carpets.
Communication Museum (Post and Telegraph)	موزه ارتباطات, موزهٔ پست و تلگراف	Post and Telegraph Museum or Communication Museum; Examples of the oldest Stationery and tools for sending postal and Chapar Khaneh packages, the first telephones, Machine taper Telegraphy, Postage stamp and other means of communication from Columbidae to Satellite displayed here.
Ali Akbar Sanati Museum	موزه استاد صنعتی, موزه هلال احمر, موزه ۱۳ آبان, موزه شیر و خورشید	It has been set up to display the works of Ali Akbar San'ati, Iranian painter and sculptor. It was the house of Reza Shah, who later became the first center of the Red Lion and Sun Society by his daughter, Shams Pahlavi. Before Iranian revolution, the building was registered as the San'ati Museum by the Red Lion and Sun Society, and people could visit it, and the Master San'ati himself worked upstairs and was responsible for maintaining the museum. After the revolution, on the recommendation of Master San'ati, the building was renamed to the 13th Aban Museum for a while. Also known as Hilal Ahmar Museum.
Archbishop Ardak Manookian Museum	موزه اسقف اعظم آرداک مانوکیان, موزه مردم شناسی ارامنه	The museum was named after the late Archbishop Ardak Manookian in 2008 and is also known as the Armenian Anthropological Museum. The museum displays equipment for religious ceremonies, pictures and information on Armenian churches and monasteries, traditional clothing of Armenian women in different historical periods, statues donated by Lilit Teryan, a prominent sculptor, and other works by Armenian artists.
Imam Ali Museum	موزه امام علی, موزه هنرهای دینی امام علی	Or Imam Ali Museum of Religious Arts has religious theme; Most of the museum's works is in the field of visual arts include fantasy paintings, contemporary painting, volumetric works, illustration, photography and calligraphy, and a few works include lacquer covers, calligraphy scrapbooks, penners, carpets and lithographs.
Museum of Ancient Iran	موزه ایران باستان	The first independent museum in Iran, one of the museums of National Museum of Iran.
Museum of Biodiversity	موزه تنوع زیستی, موزه پردیسان	It is located in Pardisan Nature Park in the northwest of Tehran. The Museum of Biodiversity was established in 2004 with an emphasis on the importance and value of biodiversity and in line with the legal duties of the Environmental Protection Organization of Iran.
Jahan Nama Museum	موزه جهان‌نما	It was built in 1976 on the grounds of the Niavaran Complex to host gifts donated to Farah Pahlavi or works of art that she purchased from various countries.
Hayk Mirzayans Insect Museum	موزه حشره‌شناسی هایک میرزایانس	With more than four million insect specimens, it is the only official reference for the identification and classification of insects and the richest zoological museum in Iran.
Mahmoud Hessabi museum	موزه دکتر حسابی	After the death of Dr. Mahmoud Hesabi, a famous Iranian physicist, the museum was created in his house in 1992. In it, personal belongings, scientific and educational qualifications, badges and letters of appreciation and old photographs of Mahmoud Hessabi are displayed.
Museum of the Islamic Era	موزه دوران اسلامی	One of the museums of National Museum of Iran. It is dedicated to displaying historical monuments and objects of post-Islamic Iran.
Rasam Arabzadeh Museum	موزه رسام عرب‌زاده, موزه فرش رسام عرب‌زاده	Exhibition of carpets and modern designs of Seyyed Abolfath Rasam Arabzadeh, a prominent Iranian carpet designer. The museum has carpet weaving workshops.
Reza Abbasi Museum	موزه رضا عباسی	The museum's name been chosen in memory of the famous painter of the Safavid era, Reza Abbasi. Includes works of art from the prehistoric period up to the 13th century AH, which are displayed in three halls: Pre-Islamic Hall, Islamic Arts Hall, Painting and Calligraphy Hall.
Tehran Coin Museum	موزه سکه, موزه بانک سپه	In this museum, coins of different periods of Iranian history, from coins of Central Iran during the Achaemenid period to the present period, are displayed.
Iranian Cinema Museum	موزه سینمای ایران	Old cinema documents and equipment from cinematic personalities such as dubbers and filmmakers, as well as behind the scenes of major films, posters and other cinema-related items are displayed here.
Shohada Museum	موزه شهدا	Museum of Martyrs; In this museum, personal belongings and relics left by the victims of the Iran–Iraq War, the events of the 1979 revolution and other Iranian victims who are called martyrs according to the conditions in the system of the Islamic Republic of Iran, are exhibited.
Tehran Peace Museum	موزه صلح تهران	One of the museums of the International Network of Peace Museums; Promoting a culture of peace by showing the unfortunate consequences of war and violence and its harmful effects on human beings and the environment.
The City Photo Museum	موزه عکسخانه, موزه‌ عکسخانه‌ی شهر	Photography Museum; The first specialized museum of the history of photography in the Middle East. With a specialized subject in the history of Iranian photography, it is a treasure trove of photographs and other photographic visual heritage (postcards, glass negatives, etc.), cameras, and other photographic tools and implements.
Museum of Sciences and Technology of Iran	موزه علوم و فناوری ایران, موزه ملی علوم و فناوری ایران	Introducing the scientific achievements of Iran in the pre-Islamic and post-Islamic eras, as well as showing the principles and theories of modern science and technology.
Carpet Museum of Iran	موزه فرش ایران	Architect: Abdol-Aziz Mirza Farmanfarmaian; In this museum, very exquisite carpets from all over Iran, which are the work of famous artists, are exhibited.
Iranian Museum of Graphic Design	موزه گرافیک ایران	It is the first graphic design museum in Asia, everything known as the history of graphic design in Iran is preserved here.
Safir Office Machines Museum	موزه ماشین‌های اداری سفیر	More than 80 valuable and unique works of the world's first typewriters such as elementary typewriters, check perforators, calculators, pencil sharpeners, polycopy machines and telegraph machines are kept here.
National Museum of Iran	موزه ملی ایران	This museum consists of two separate buildings called the Museum of Ancient Iran and the Museum of the Islamic Era. The most important museum in the country in terms of preservation, display and research of Iranian archaeological collections.
Iranian National Museum of Medical Sciences History	موزه ملی تاریخ علوم پزشکی ایران	The first medical museum established in Iran. Exhibition about medical instruments and documents of prehistoric and historical periods until the contemporary period.
National Museum of the Holy Quran	موزه ملی قرآن کریم	Specialized museums in the field of introducing manuscripts and works of Quranic art. It shows the gradual evolution of Quranic arts in the period from about the fourth century SH to the end of the Qajar period and responds to the questioning needs of different classes of people and artists.
National Press Museum of Iran	موزه ملی مطبوعات ایران	It displays the history of the Iranian press and publications, has important historical documents that have a history of 170 to 180 years. Old printing industry machines, manuscripts of the first journalists, old editions of press and publications, cameras and photographic and printing equipment, old photographs about journalism as well as logos, a list of pioneers in the field of journalism and related tools and equipment exhibited here.
Music Museum of Iran	موزه موسیقی ایران	This museum with an area of approximately 3650 meters and more than 1400 meters of infrastructure on three floors with the aim of preserving the national music heritage, introducing the works and productions of the past and honoring professors and veterans in the field of music, was inaugurated on November 13, 2009.
Military Museum	موزه نظامی, موزه نظامی کاخ سعدآباد, کاخ شهرام	Also known as Shahram Palace, located in Sa'dabad Complex, evolution of military equipment and military characteristics of different historical periods in Iran such as soldiers figures of the Achaemenid, Sassanid, Safavid, Qajar, Kazakhs eras and figures of Iranian military commanders of Iran–Iraq War exhibited here.
Museum of Fine Arts	موزه هنرهای زیبا, کاخ موزه هنرهای زیبا	Located in Sa'dabad Complex, exhibits precious and exquisite paintings such as 8 exquisite works by the famous painter Mohammad Ghaffari nicknamed Kamal-ol-Molk.
Tehran Museum of Contemporary Art	موزه هنرهای معاصر تهران	Architect: Kamran Diba; It is one of the most famous museums in Iran and contains the most comprehensive and important treasures of modern art outside of Europe and North America and 5 to 10 most important collections of modern art in the world.
Anthropology Museum of Tehran	موزه مردم‌شناسی تهران, کاخ ابیض تهران	It includes works related to the people of different cities of Iran in the Qajar and contemporary periods. It has calligraphy, photography, sculpture, carpentry workshops, as well as a library, reading room, lecture hall and forty-seven booths related to works collected from all over Iran.
Shahid Rajai Museum	خانه شهید رجایی, منزل شهید رجایی, موزه شهید رجایی	In this museum, the works of Mohammad-Ali Rajai (the second President of Iran), including desks and work rooms, personal belongings, places for receiving foreign guests and his place of residence, are exhibited.
Moghaddam's House and Museum	خانه و موزه مقدم, خانه مقدم, خانه موزهٔ مقدم دانشگاه تهران	It is a historical mansion from the late Qajar period in Tehran, which was the residence of the Ehtesab-ol-Molk and Moghaddam families, and is now a museum of historical objects.
Iranian Art Museum Garden	باغ موزه هنر ایرانی, باغ سپهبد	The main fame of this museum garden is due to the existence of beautiful models of famous monuments in Iran.
Abolhasan Saba Museum	موزه صبا, موزه استاد ابوالحسن صبا	Abolhasan Saba's house, a prominent Persian traditional music artist.
Stained Glass Museum	موزه نقاشی پشت شیشه	The second Stained glass museum in the world and the only independent museum dedicated to one of the branches of Stained glass painting. It contains a huge collection of Stained glass paintings from the Safavid period to the present day.
Museum of Decorative Arts	موزه هنرهای تزئینی	Includes Wood carving, Marquetry, Khatam, traditional Iranian weavings and stitches and needlework, Metal and glass objects and all kinds of paintings and miniatures.
Museum of National Arts	موزه هنرهای ملی	As the first specialized museum in Iran, currently houses 271 valuable works of art from the 12th century SH until now in the fields of painting, miniature, fine weaving, Gabbeh and carpet, Wood carving, Marquetry, Khatam and tiling.
Museum of Bank Melli Iran	موزه بانک ملی ایران	Includes old Iranian coins from the Achaemenid period to the contemporary era, old machines used in the bank, old cash registers, Qajar period paintings and also face paintings of the former CEO of Bank Melli Iran.
Tehran Museum of Natural History	موزه تاریخ طبیعت تهران	All animals found in the nature of Iran are displayed in taxidermy shape and rare species of wildlife and extinct generations of native and non-native animals of Iran.
Sorkheh Hesar Wildlife Museum	موزه حیات وحش سرخه‌حصار	Includes taxidermy specimens of mammals, birds, reptiles and amphibians, and specimens of insects, minerals and fossils, and herbariums of dried plants and plant seeds.
Museum of Iranian Electrical Industry	موزه صنعت برق ایران	Including old objects and documents related to the electricity industry from about 120 years ago to date with the evolution history of this industry in Iran.
Map Museum of Tehran	موزه نقشه تهران	Contains a unique collection of old and original maps of Tehran, including old documents and related books to the latest satellite photos.
Museum of Contemporary Arts of Palestine	موزه هنرهای معاصر فلسطین	Includes works by the best Palestinians painters expelled from their homeland and living in Syria, Lebanon and Jordan. And for holding exhibitions about the Islamic world.
U.S. Den of Espionage Museum		

== Gallery ==
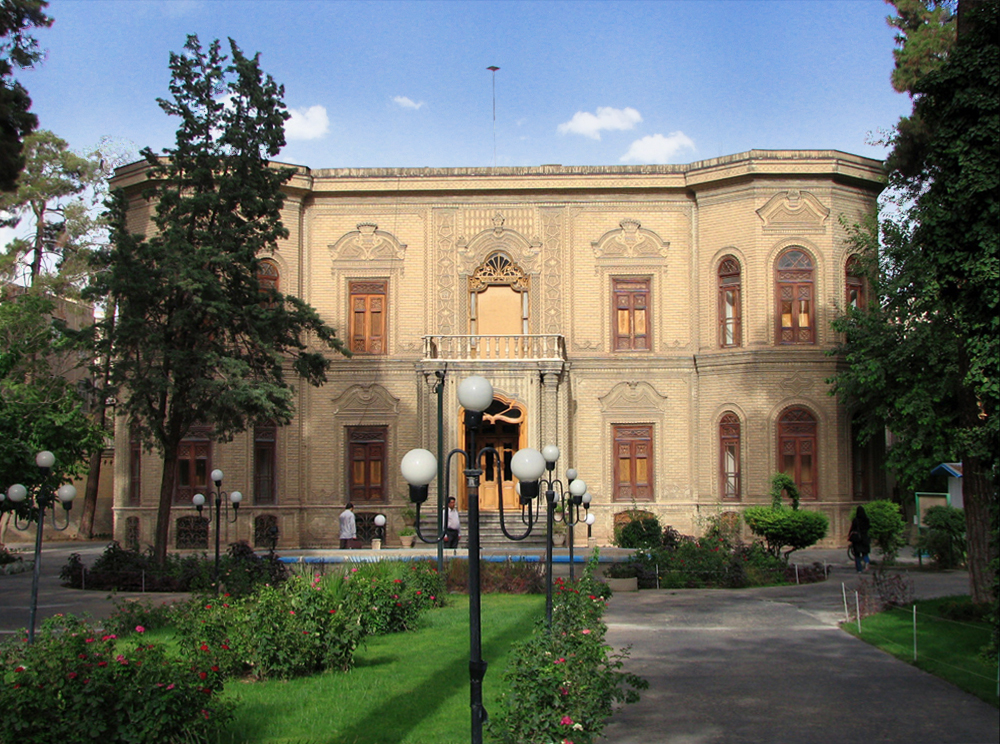
Abgineh Museum of Tehran

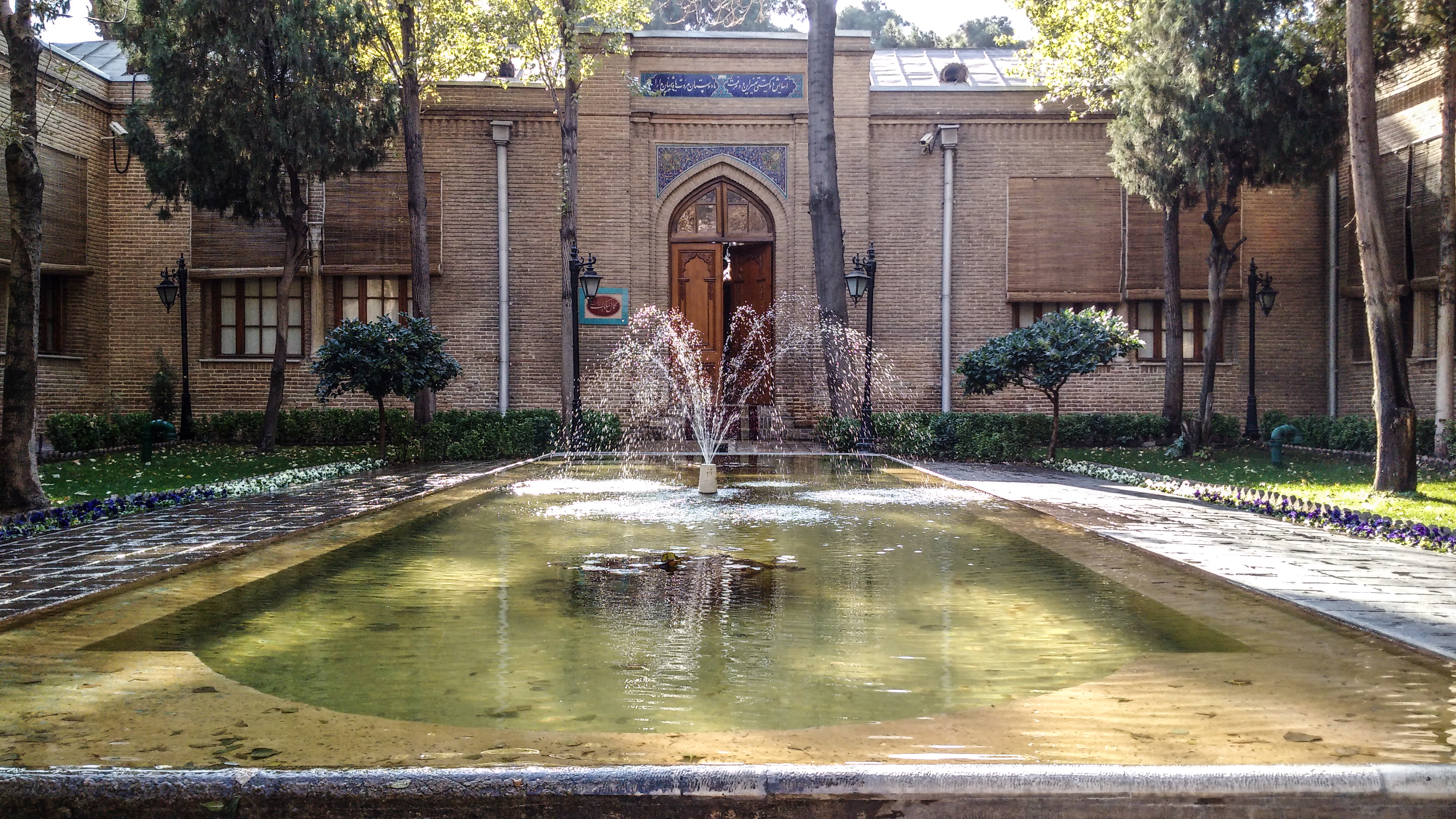
Negarestan: Garden and Museum of University of Tehran

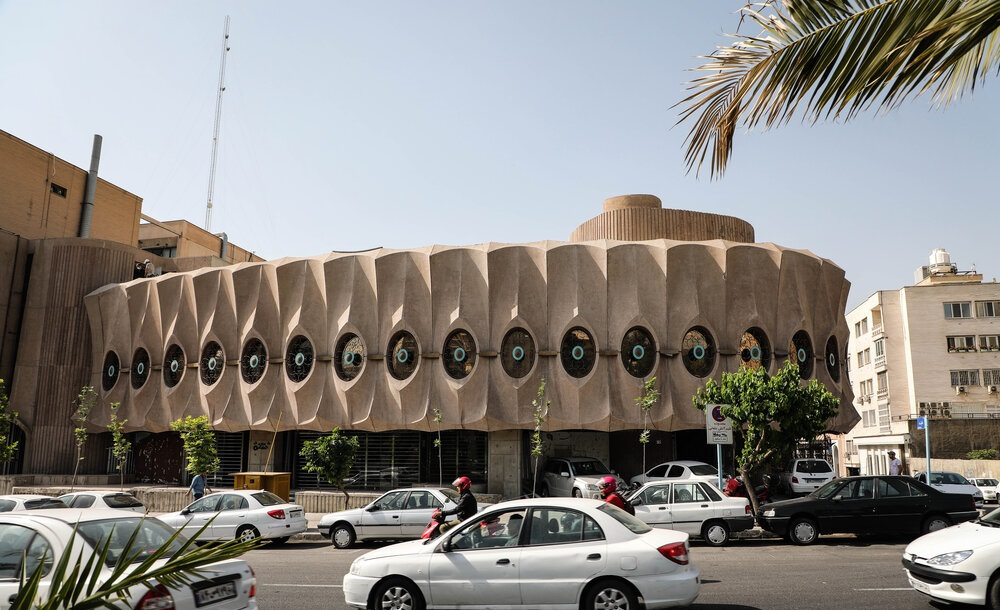
Dafineh Museum, specialized and permanent museum of coins and banknotes in Tehran

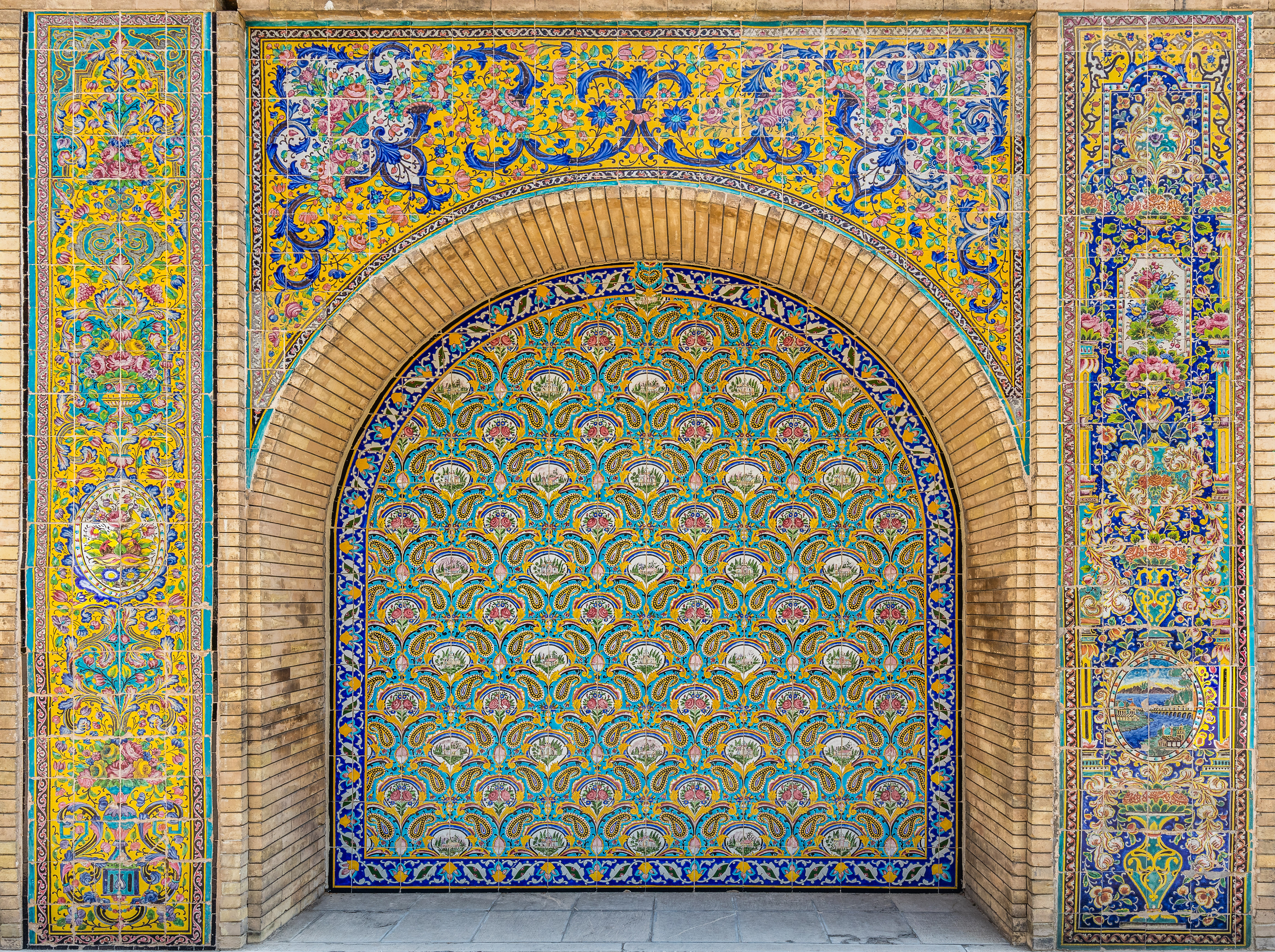
A picture of the Qashani wall tiles of Shams-ol-Emareh mansion in Golestan Palace

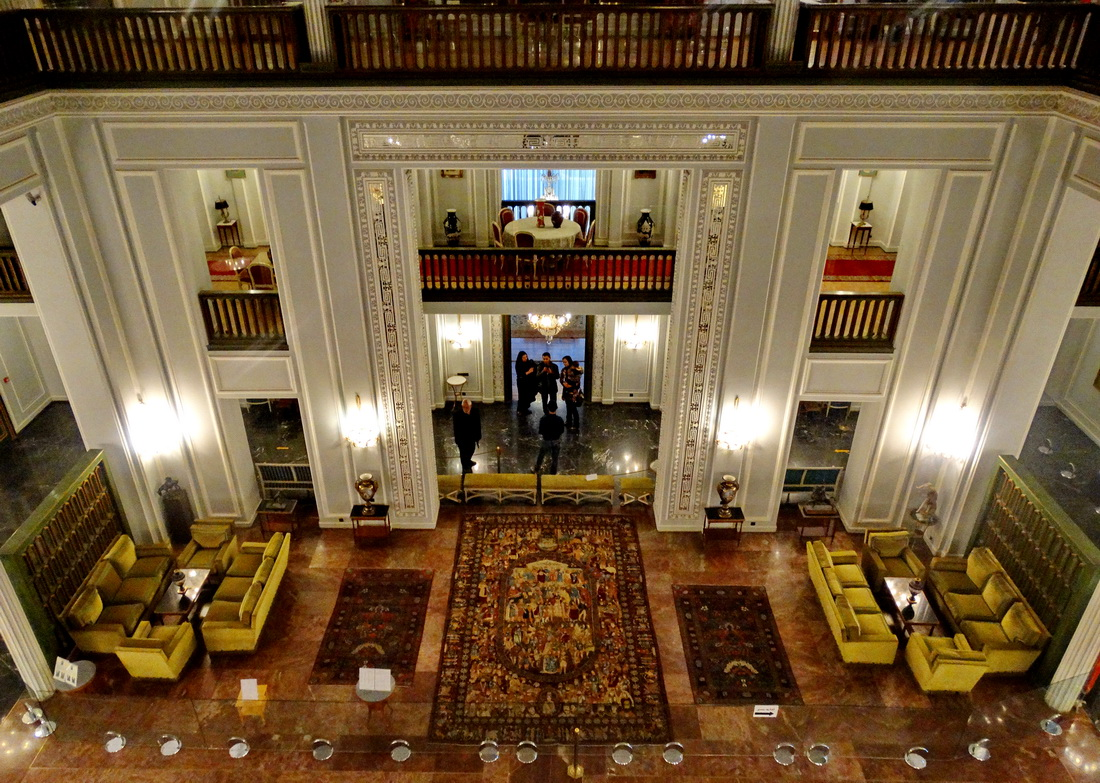
Interior view of Niavaran Palace

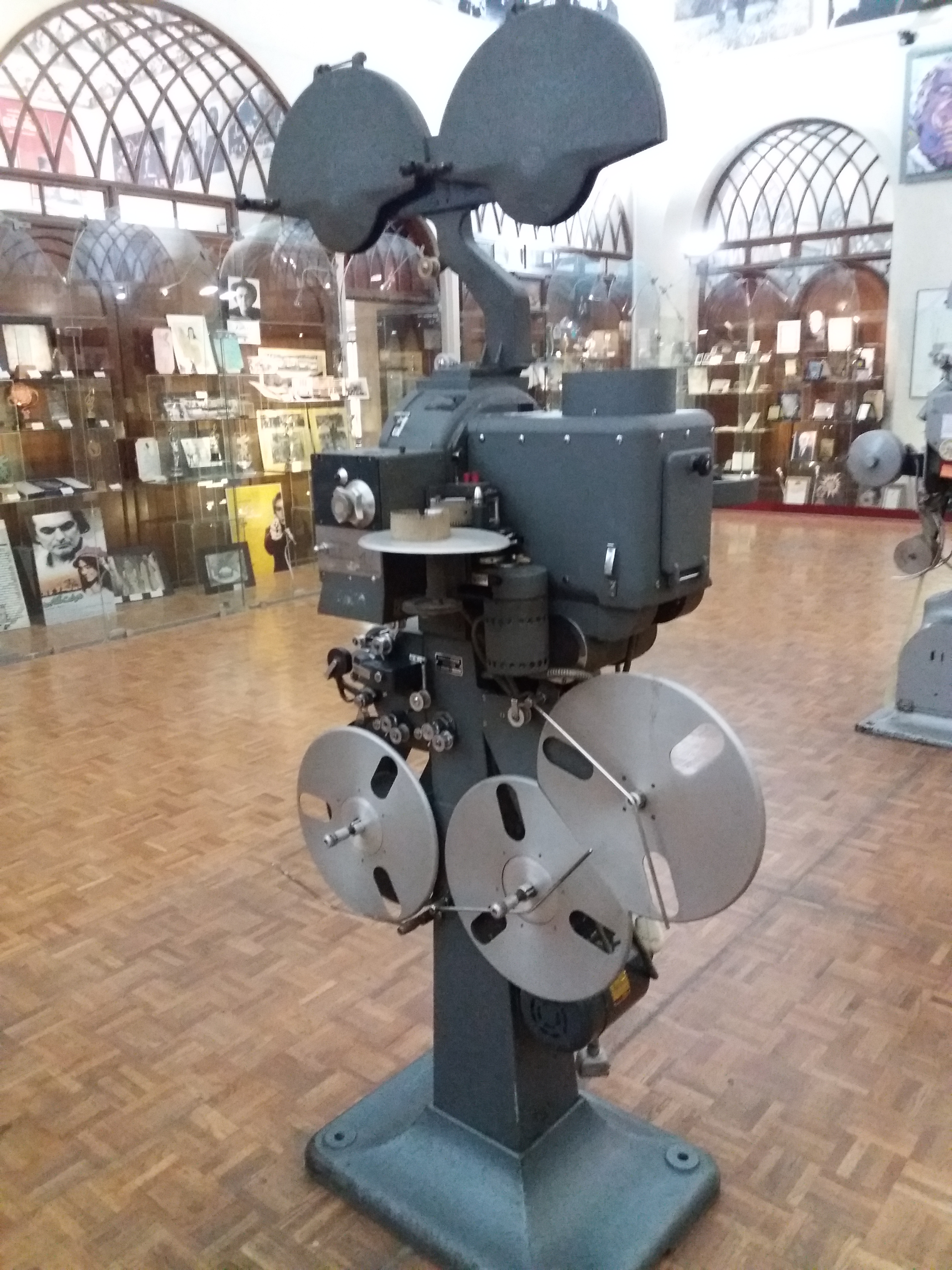
Antique cinematic equipments in Cinema Museum of Tehran

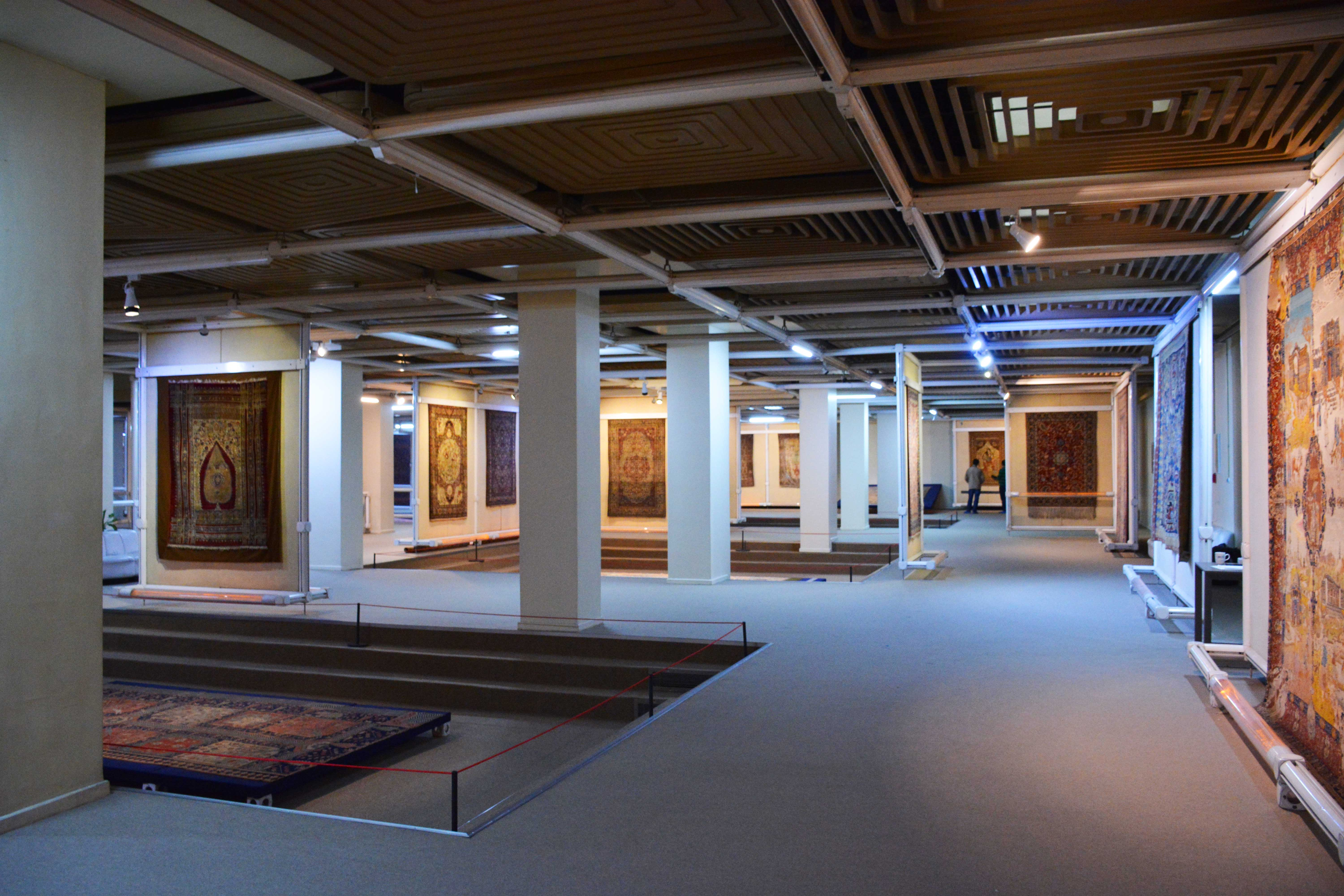
Interior of the Carpet Museum

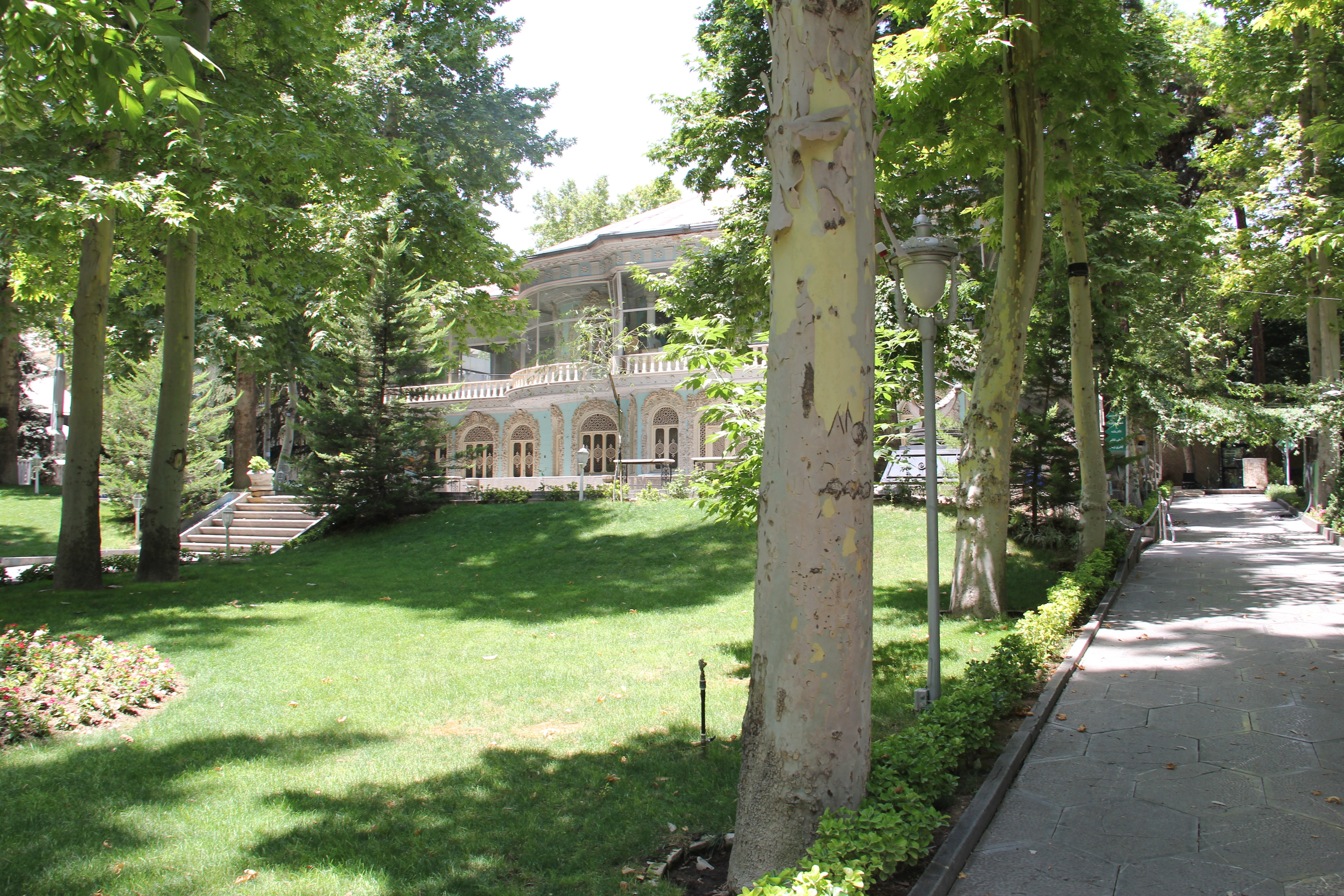
Time Museum of Tehran

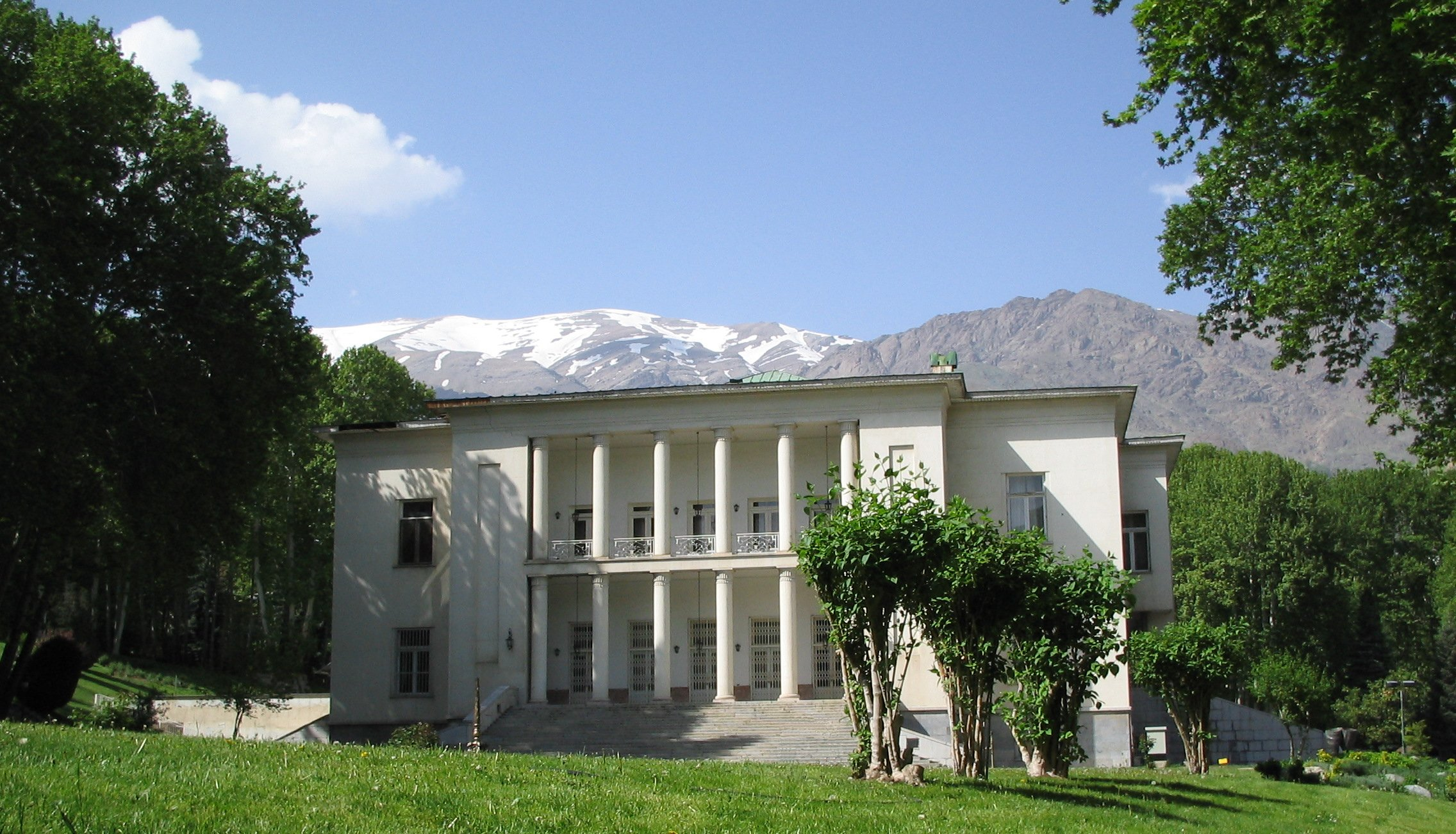
Sa'dabad mansion

== See also ==
- List of museums in Iran
- Culture of Iran
- Culture of Tehran
- Tourism in Tehran
