= Tourism in Tehran =

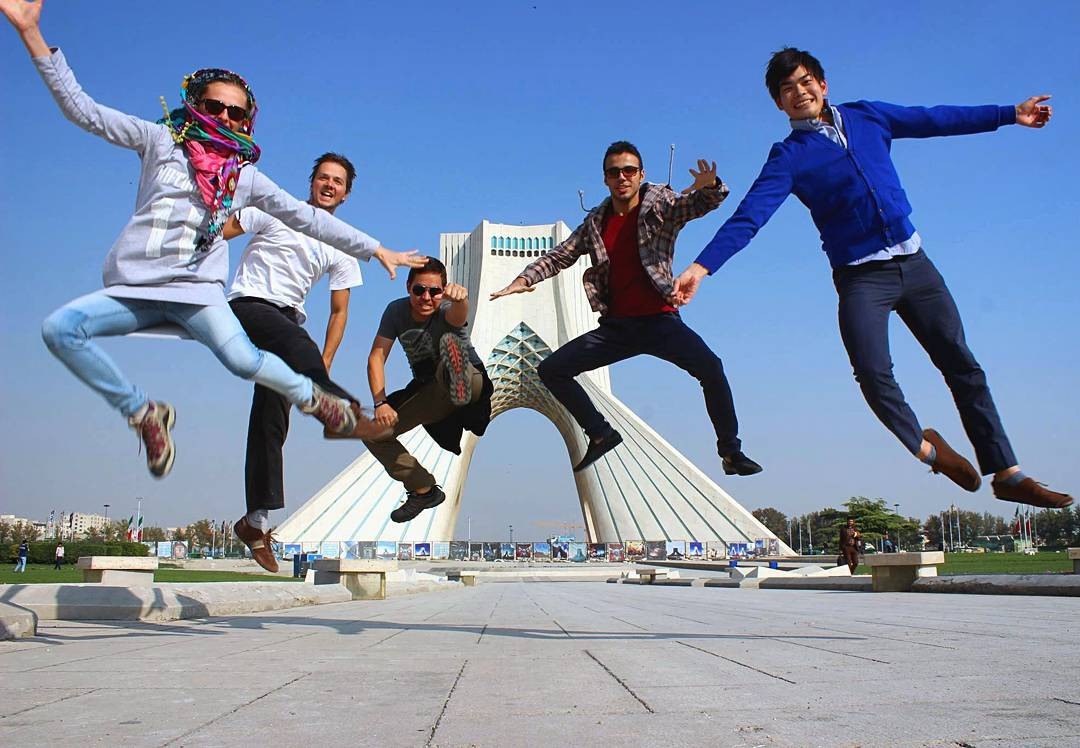
Tourists at Azadi Square

Tehran is one of Iran's leading tourism destinations, and the city is home to an array of famous tourist attractions. In 2016, Tehran received 1.64 million foreign tourists. There are several artistic, historic and scientific museums in Tehran, including World Heritage Site Golestan Palace, National Museum of Iran and the Carpet Museum. There is also the Museum of Contemporary Art, which hosts works of artists such as Andy Warhol, Pablo Picasso and Van Gogh.

The Iranian Imperial Crown Jewels, are also on display at Tehran's National Jewelry Museum. A number of cultural and trade exhibitions take place in Tehran and many of them are popular events for tourism. Tehran International Book Fair is known to the international publishing world as one of the most important publishing events in Asia. Also, There are many parks and open spaces in the Tehran area. Access to Tehran is provided by Imam Khomeini and Mehrabad airports. Also Tehran offers many forms of public transportation: Tehran Metro, a bus rapid transit system, trolleybuses, and a large network of highways with taxis.

== Tourist attractions ==
Name	Name
Kuhsar Park	Tehran's Jurassic Park
Pardisan Park	Kourosh Cineplex
Milad Tower	Eram Amusement Park
Tochal Complex	Azadi Tower
Ab-o-Atash Park	Tabiat Bridge
Carpet Museum of Iran	Museum of Contemporary Art
Laleh Park	Holy Defense Museum
Cinema Museum of Iran	Mahmoud Hessabi museum
Azadi Cinema Complex	Chitgar Lake
Cinema Farhang	National Library of Iran
City Theater	Roudaki Hall
Reza Abbasi Museum	Chitgar Park
Abgineh Museum of Tehran	Sadegh Hedayat House
National Car Museum of Iran	National Jewelry Museum
Museum of the Qasr Prison	National Museum of Iran
Park-e Shahr	Masoudie
Dar ul-Funun	Golestan Palace
Niavaran Complex	National Botanical Garden of Iran
Iranian Electrical Industry Museum	Tehran Birds Garden
Ghazzali Cinema Town	Hayk Mirzayans Insect Museum
Iranian National Museum of Medical Sciences History	Tehran Peace Museum
Safir Office Machines Museum	Soroush Cinema

== Gallery ==
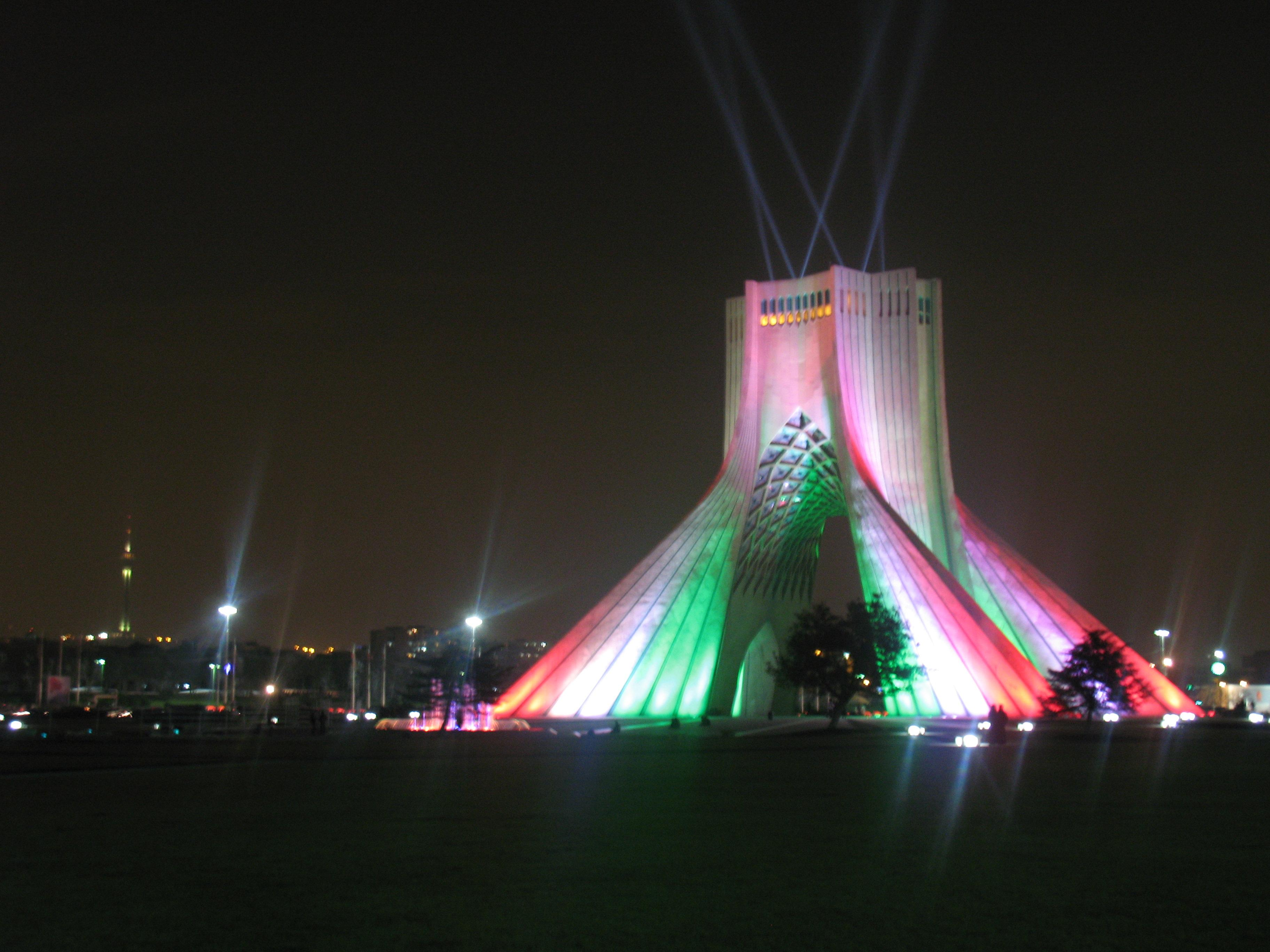
Azadi Tower

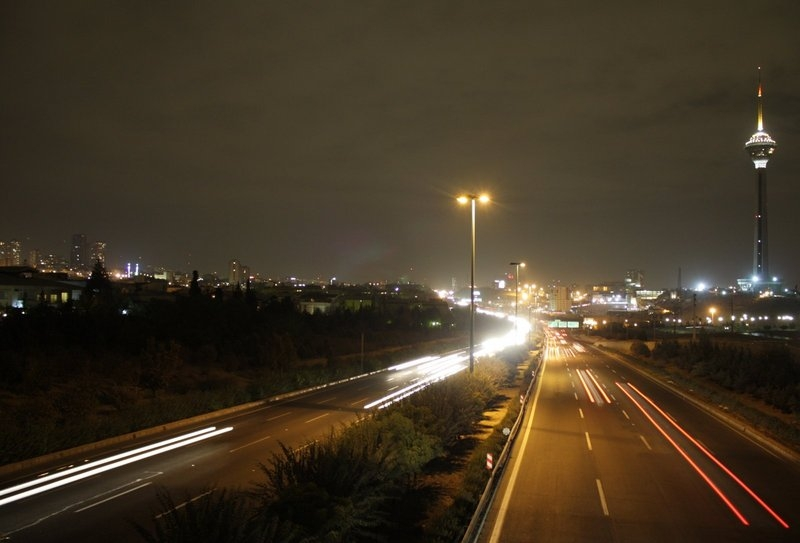
Milad Tower

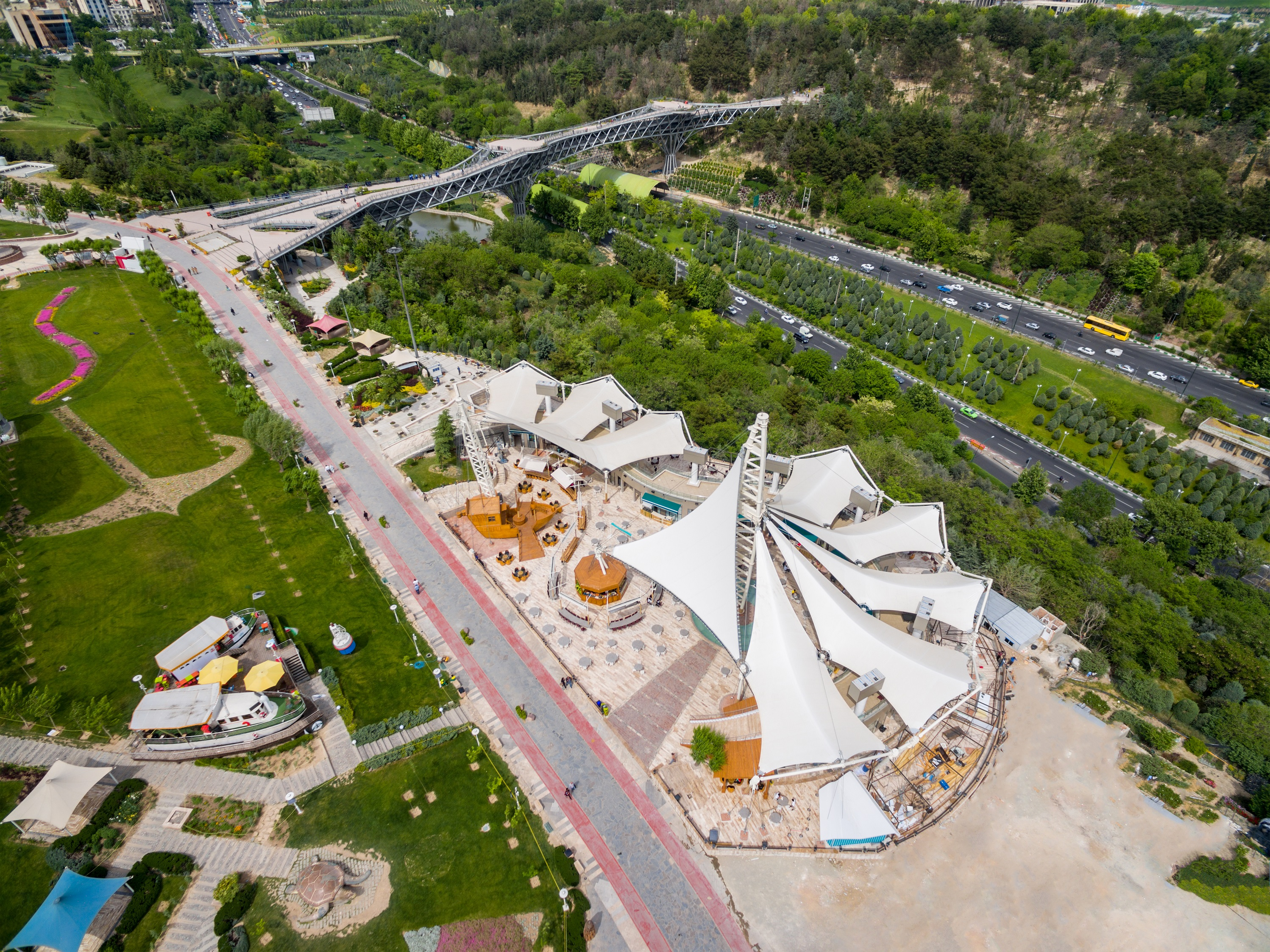
Tabiat Bridge

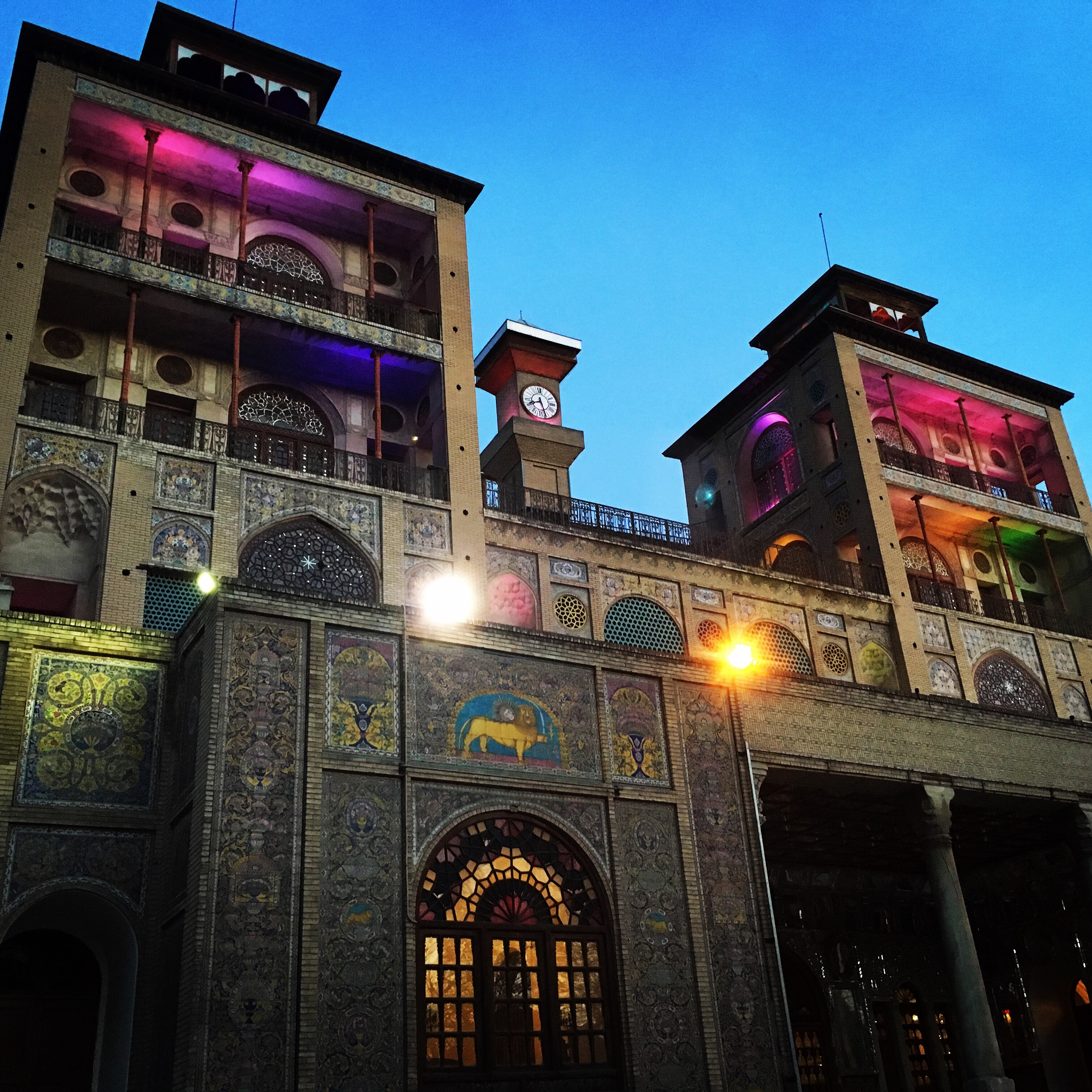
Golestan Palace

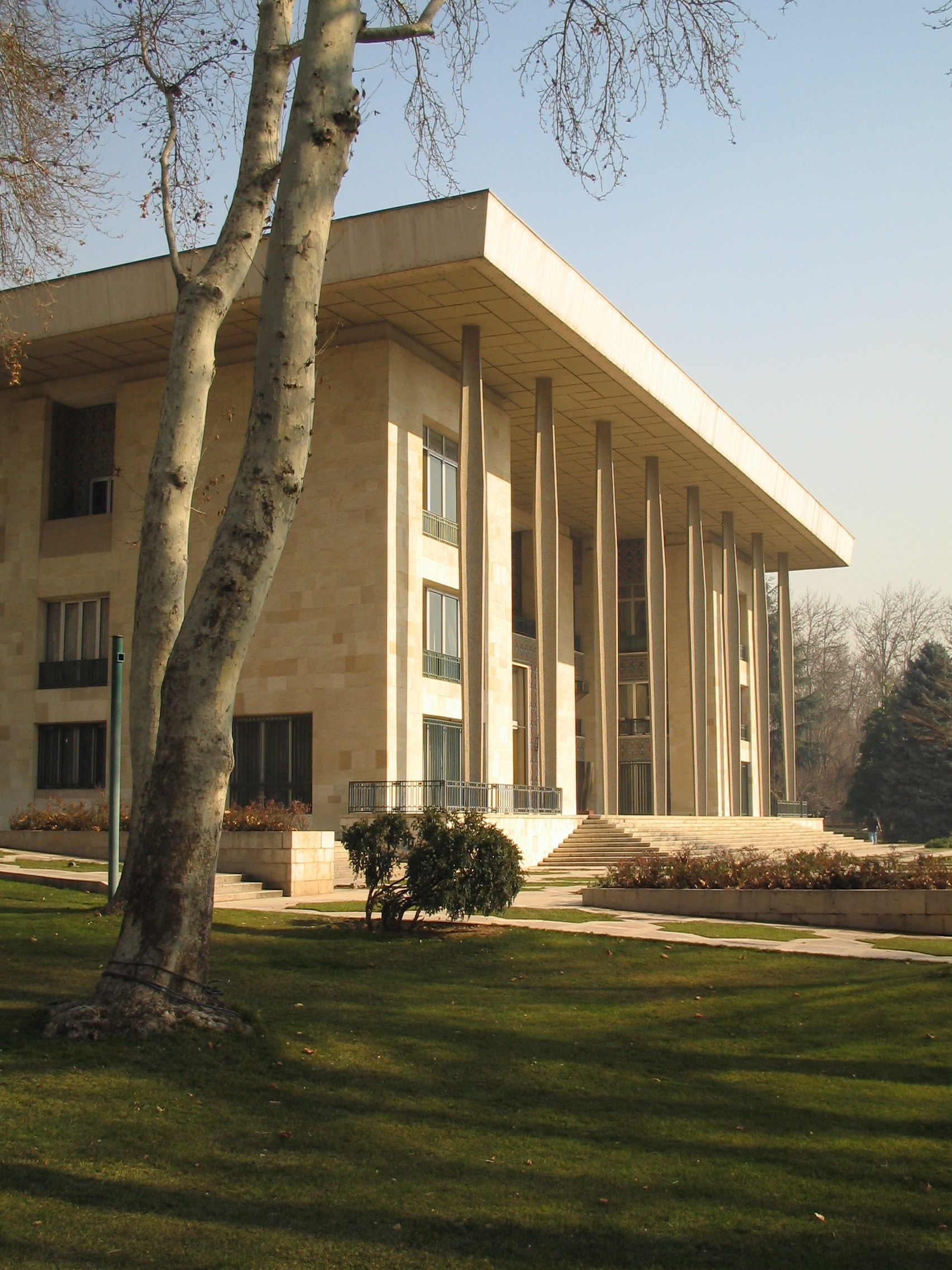
Niavaran Complex

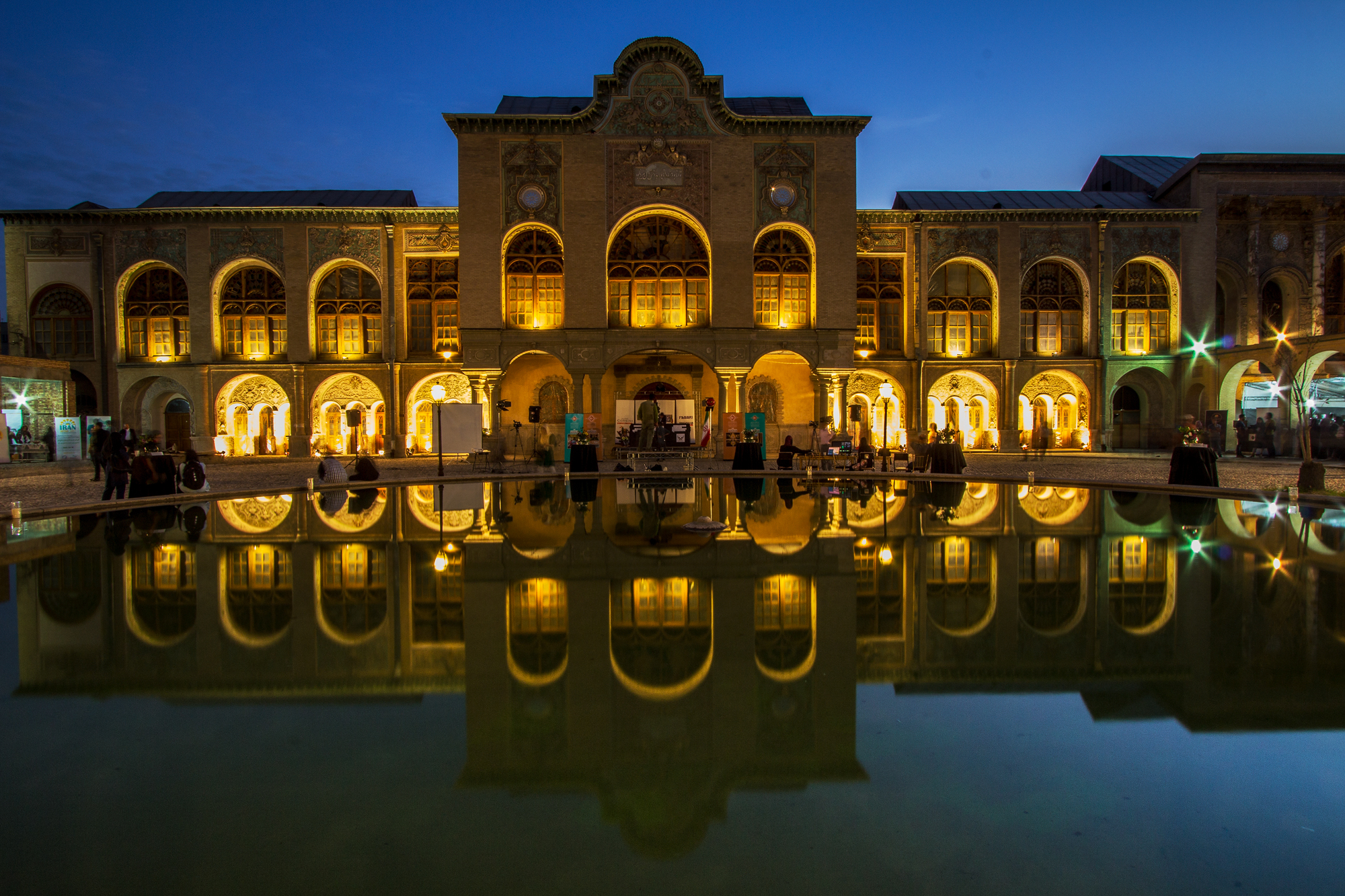
Masoudie

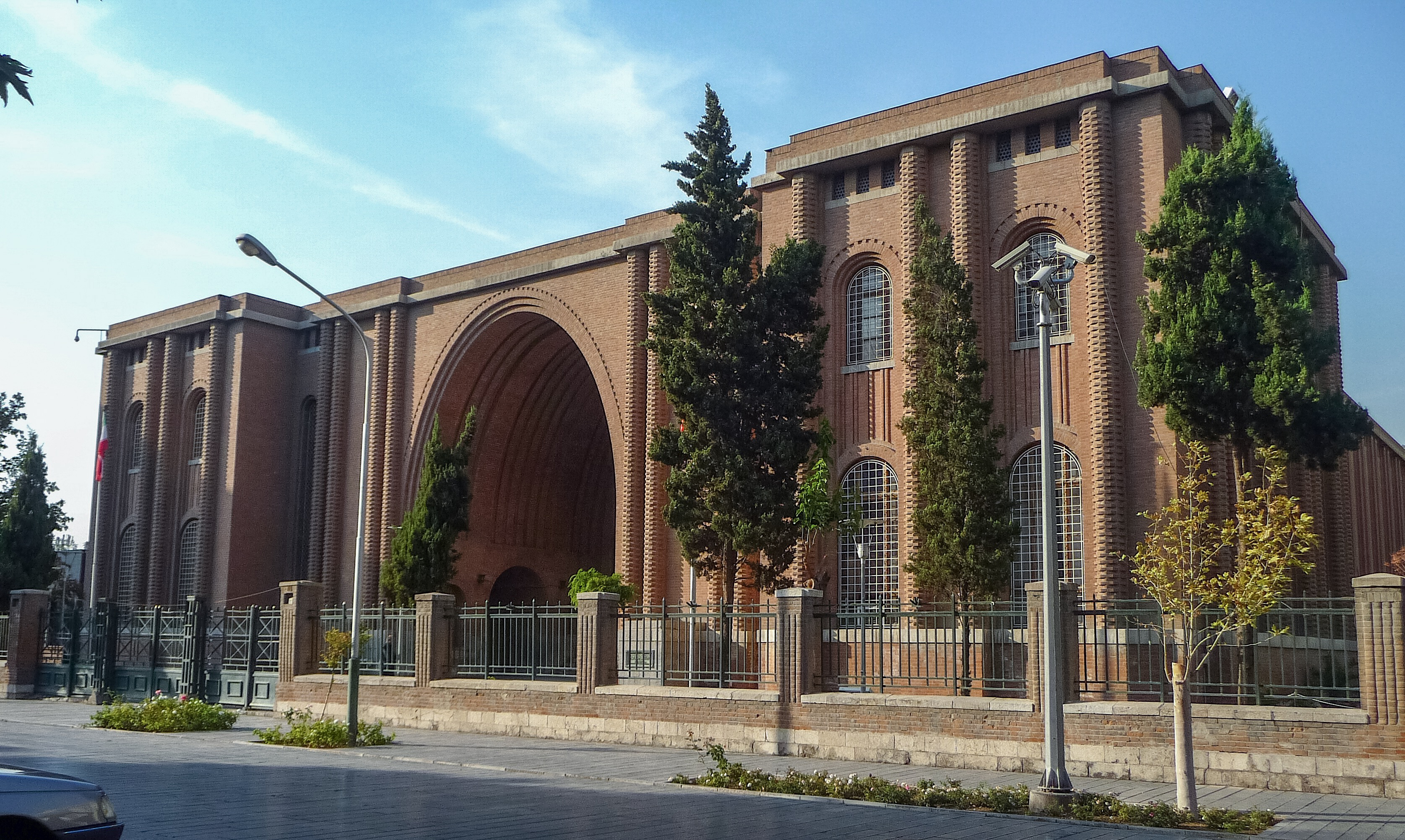
National Museum of Iran

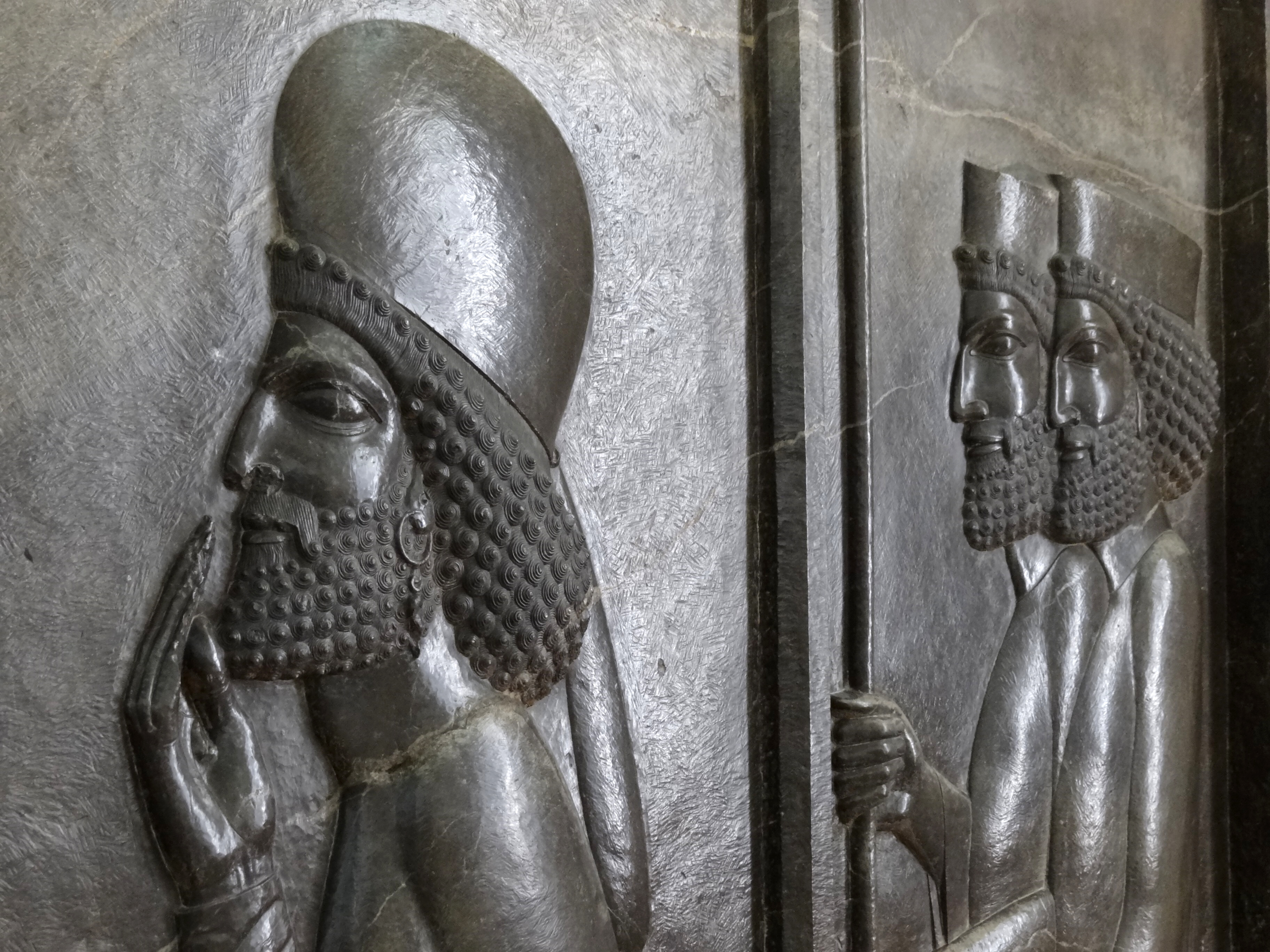
National Museum of Iran

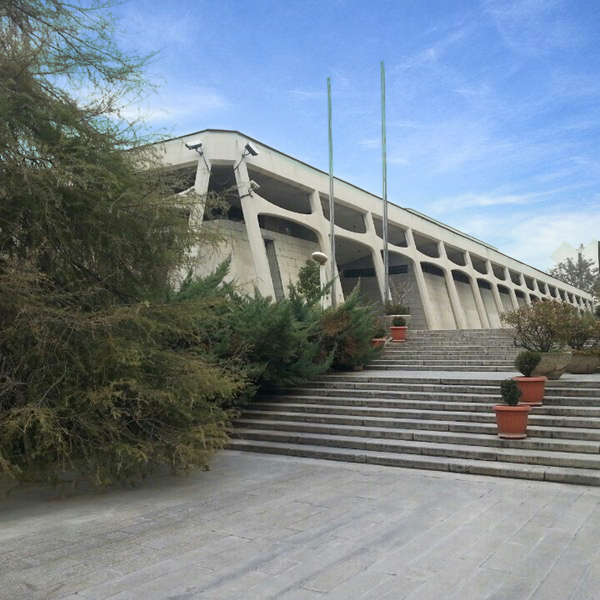
Carpet Museum of Iran

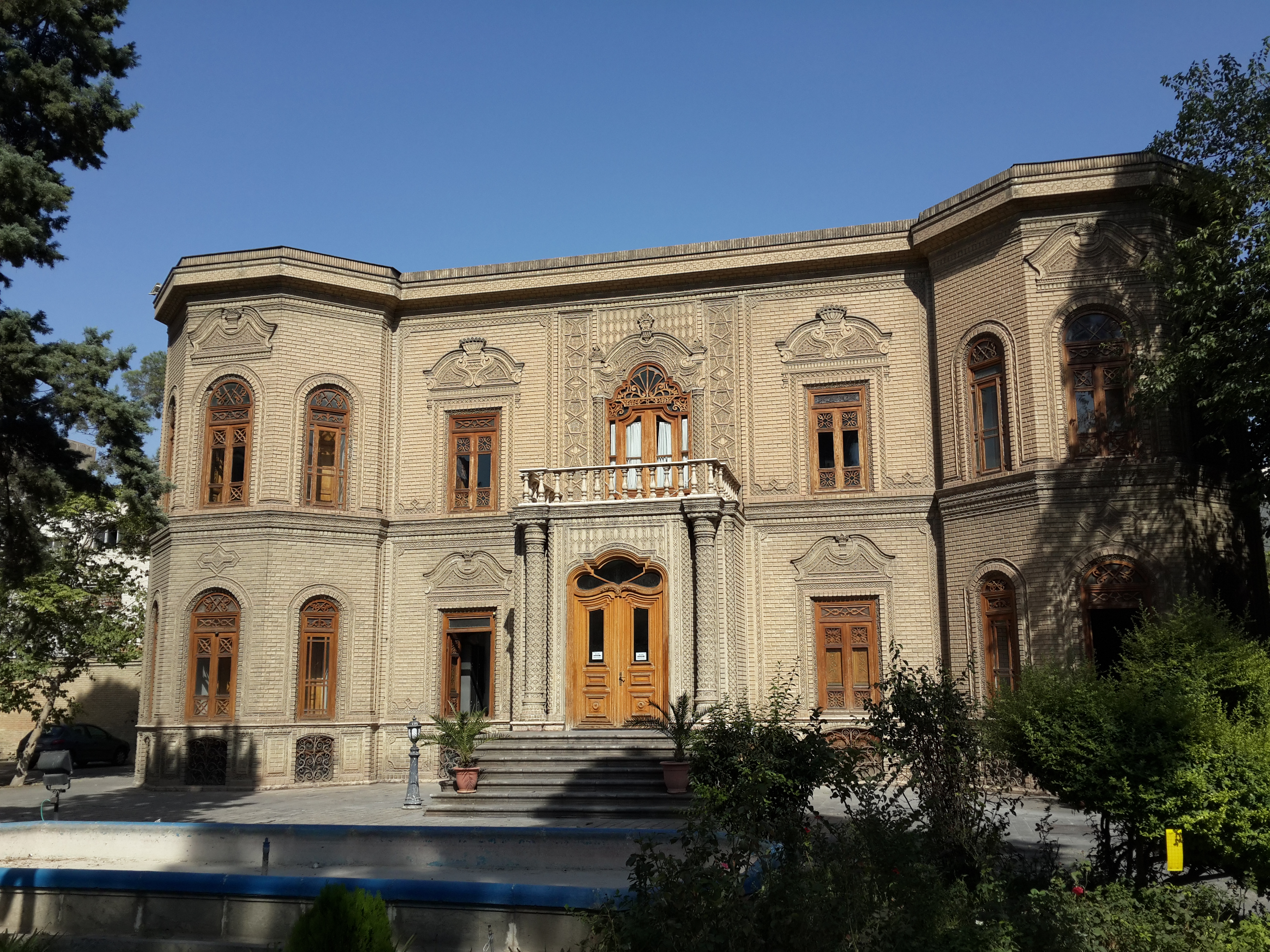
Abgineh Museum

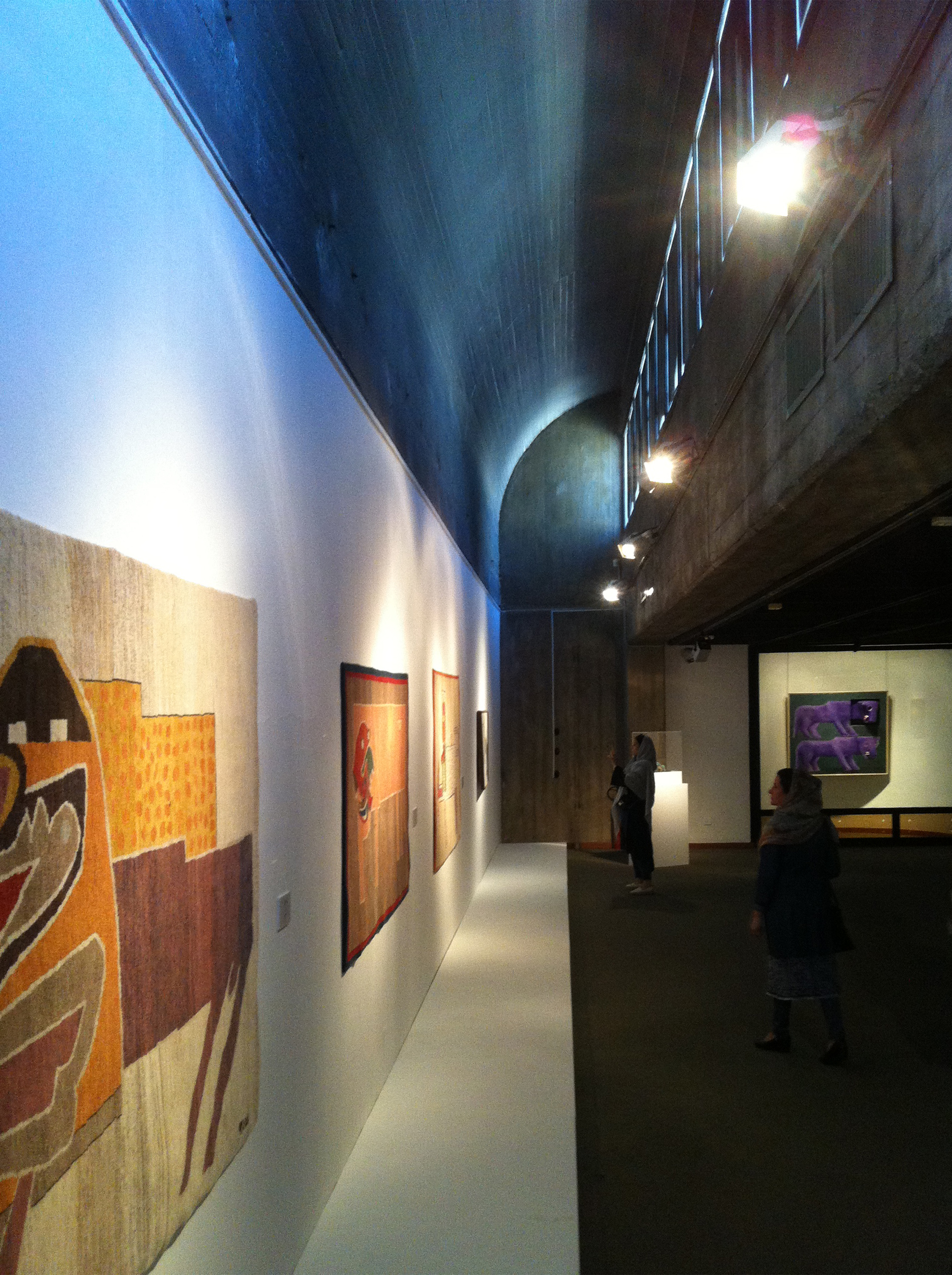
Museum of Contemporary Art

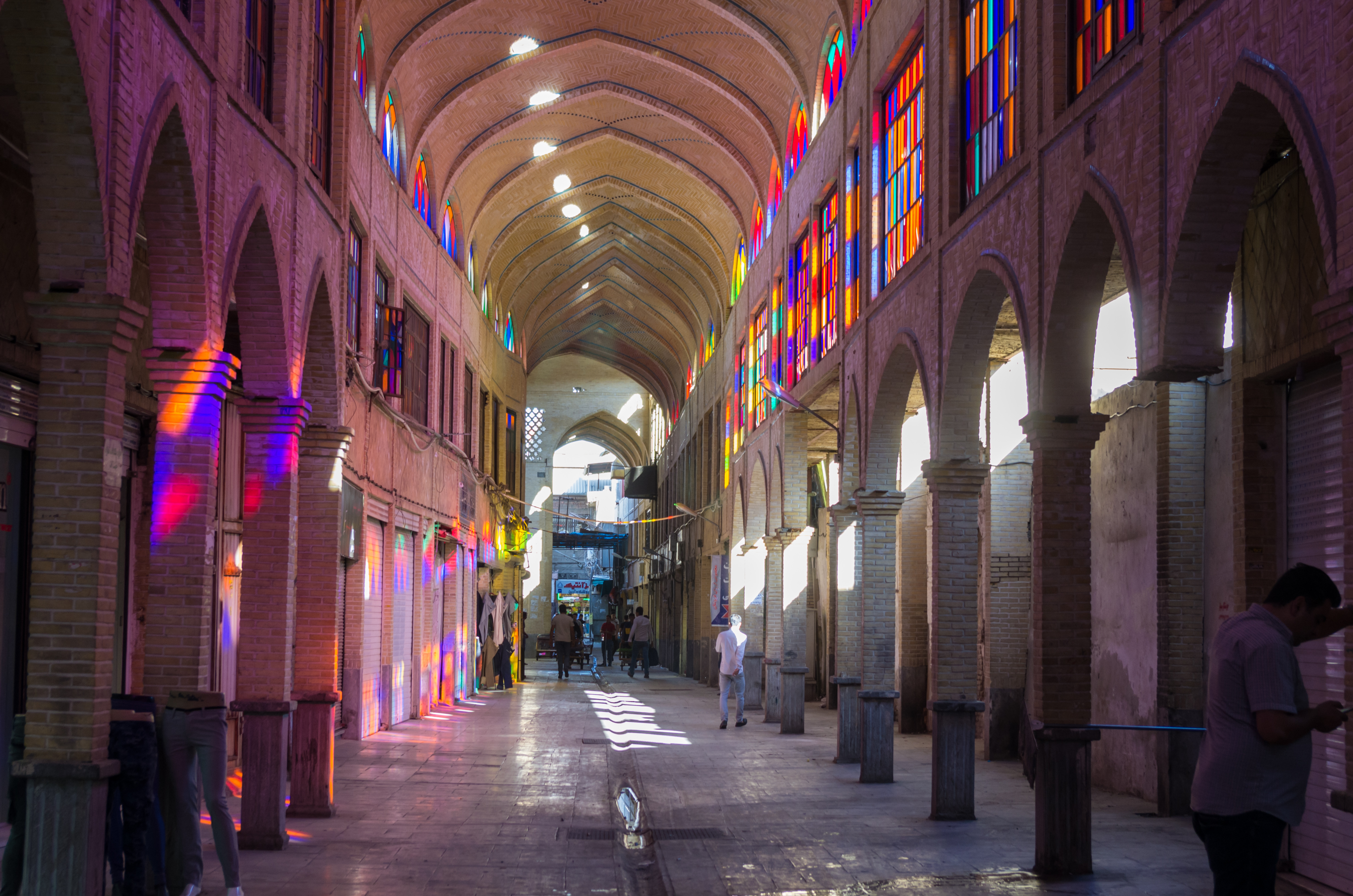
Grand Bazaar

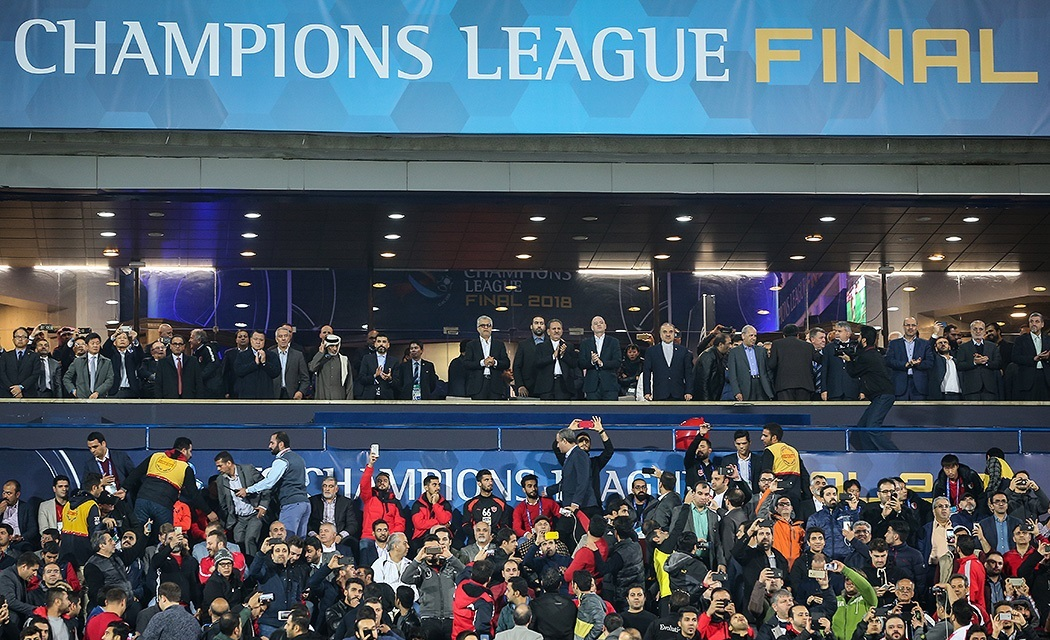
Azadi Stadium

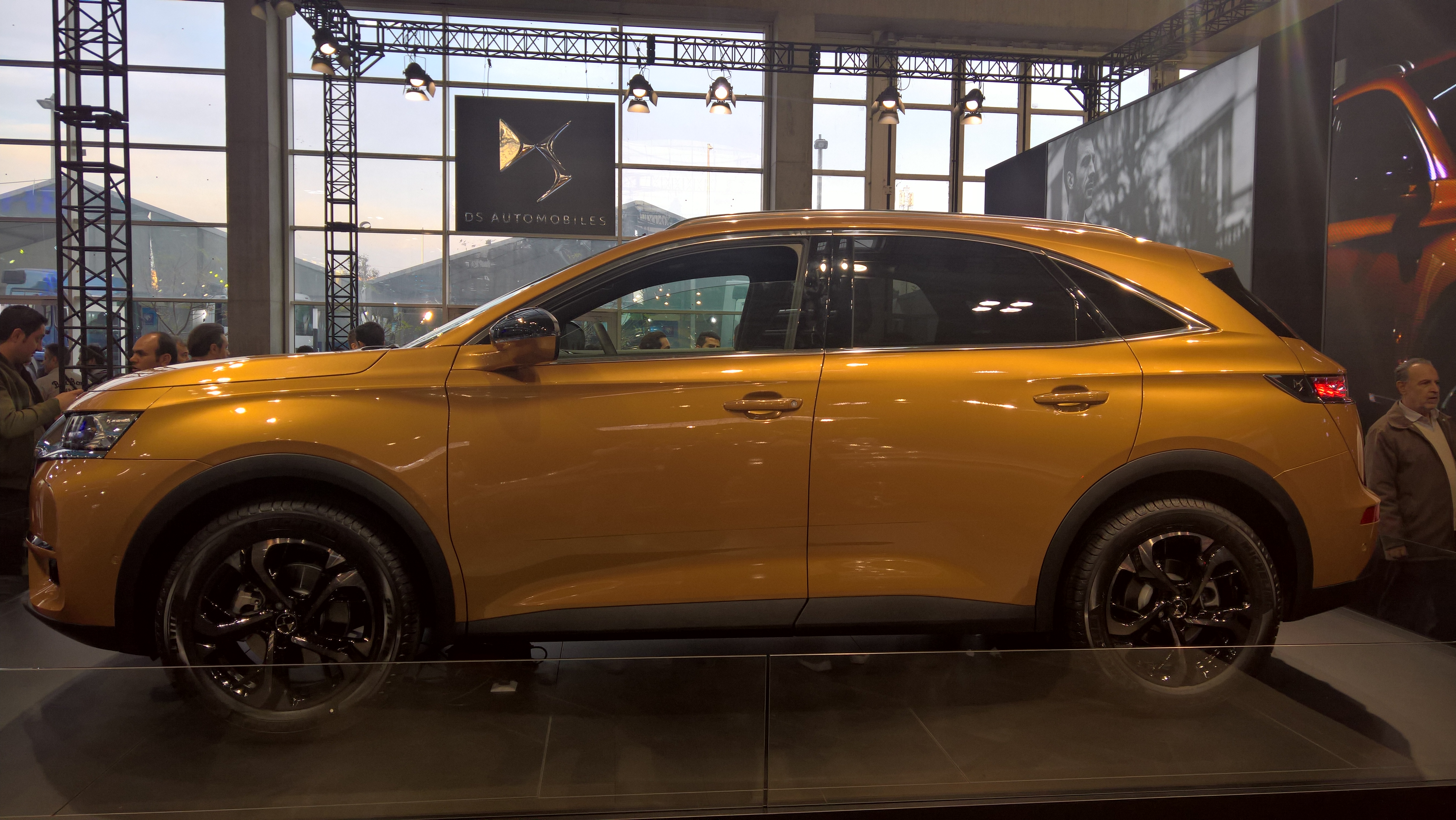
DS 7 Crossback at Tehran Auto Show

== See also ==
- Tourism in Iran
- List of tourist attractions in Tehran Province
- Hotels in Tehran
- List of museums in Tehran
