= Carpet Museum of Iran =

Museum in Tehran, Iran

- موزه فرش ایران
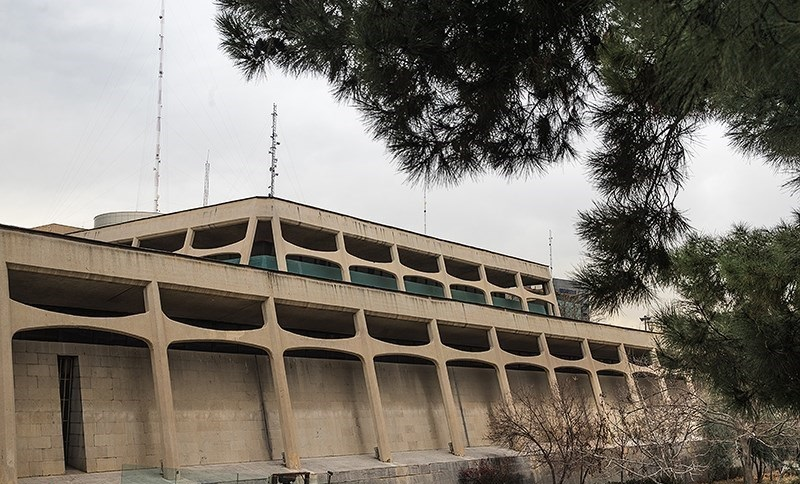

- Location within Tehran
- Established: 11 February 1978
- Location: Laleh Park; Tehran, Iran
- Coordinates: 35.7112°N 51.3904°E
- Type: Art museum
- Website: carpetmuseum.ir

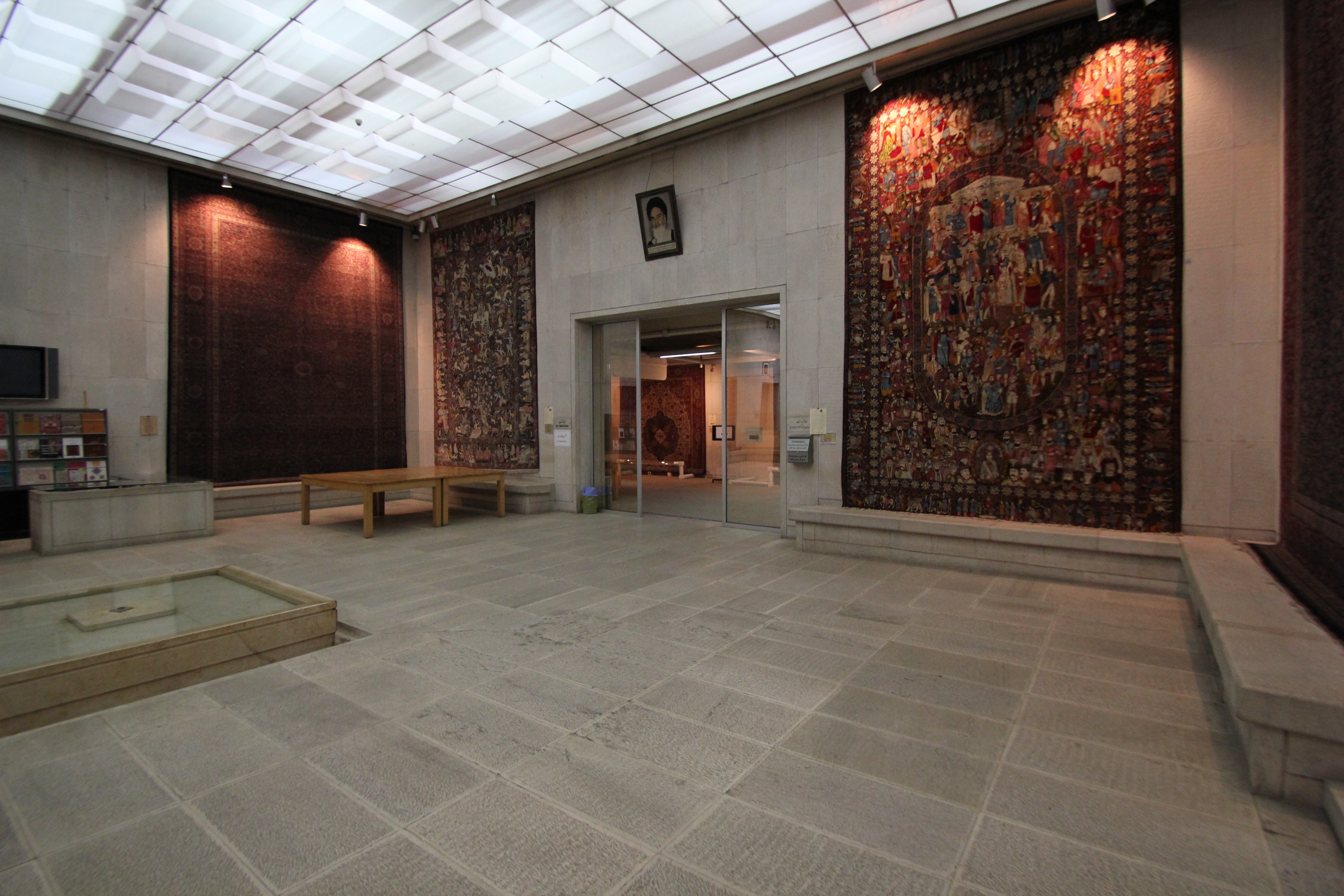
Displays in the Museum, 2011

The Carpet Museum of Iran is a museum located beside Laleh Park in Tehran, Iran. It was established by the order of Shahbanu Farah Pahlavi in 1976 to exhibit a variety of Persian carpets from all over Iran.

The museum's exhibition hall occupies 3,400 square metres (37,000 sq ft) and its library contains approximately 7,000 books. The museum was designed by the architect Abdol-Aziz Mirza Farmanfarmaian.

== Gallery ==
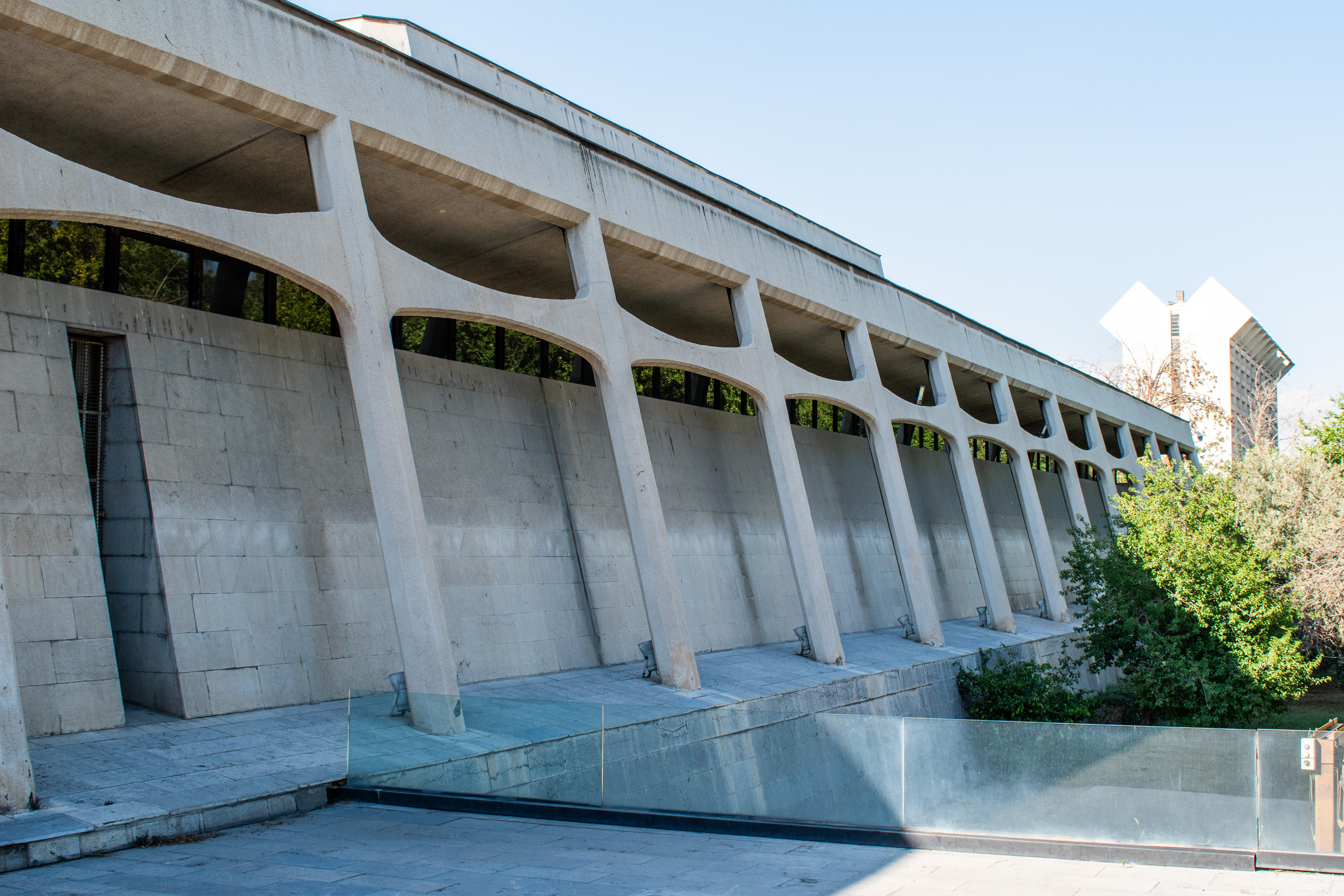

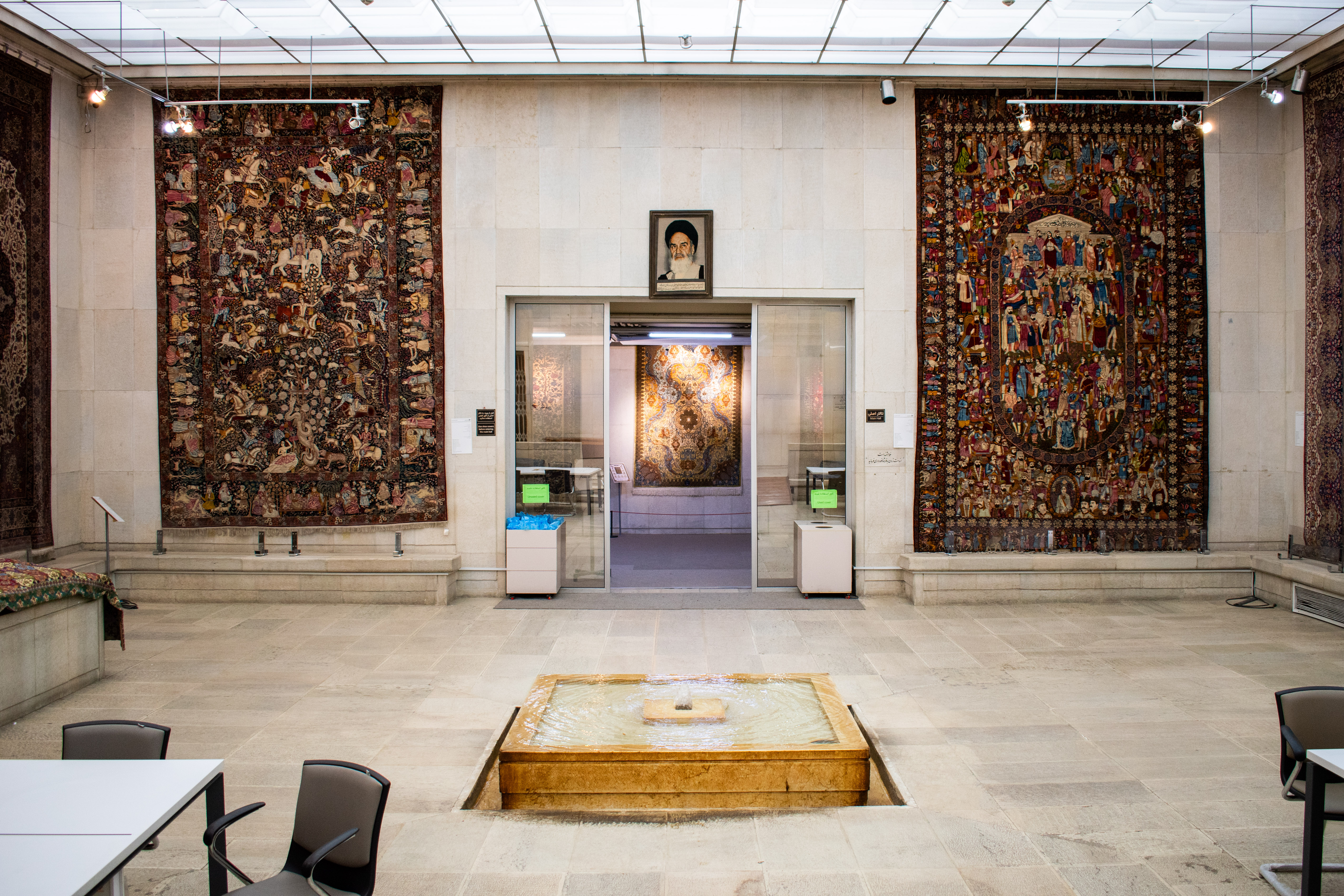

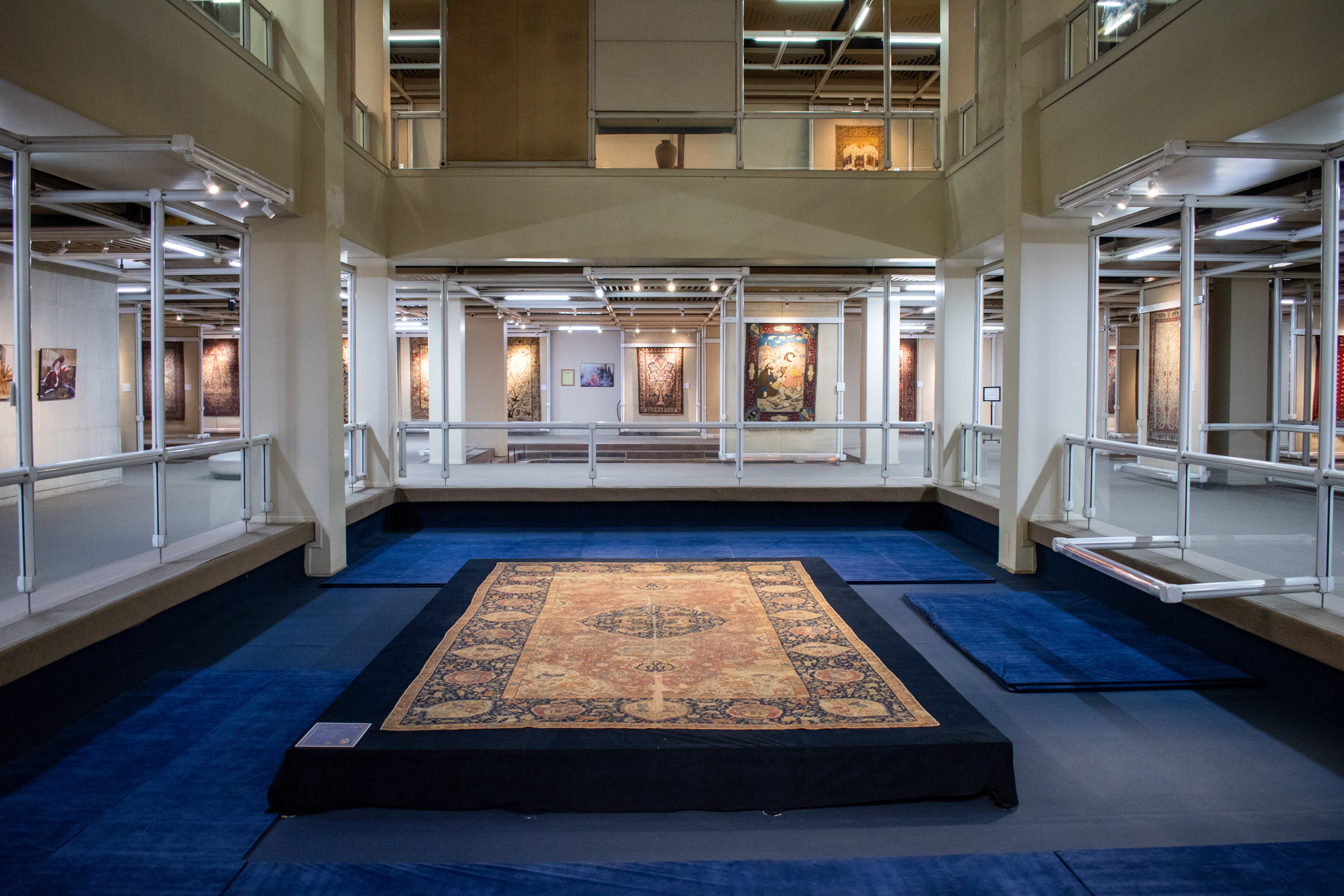

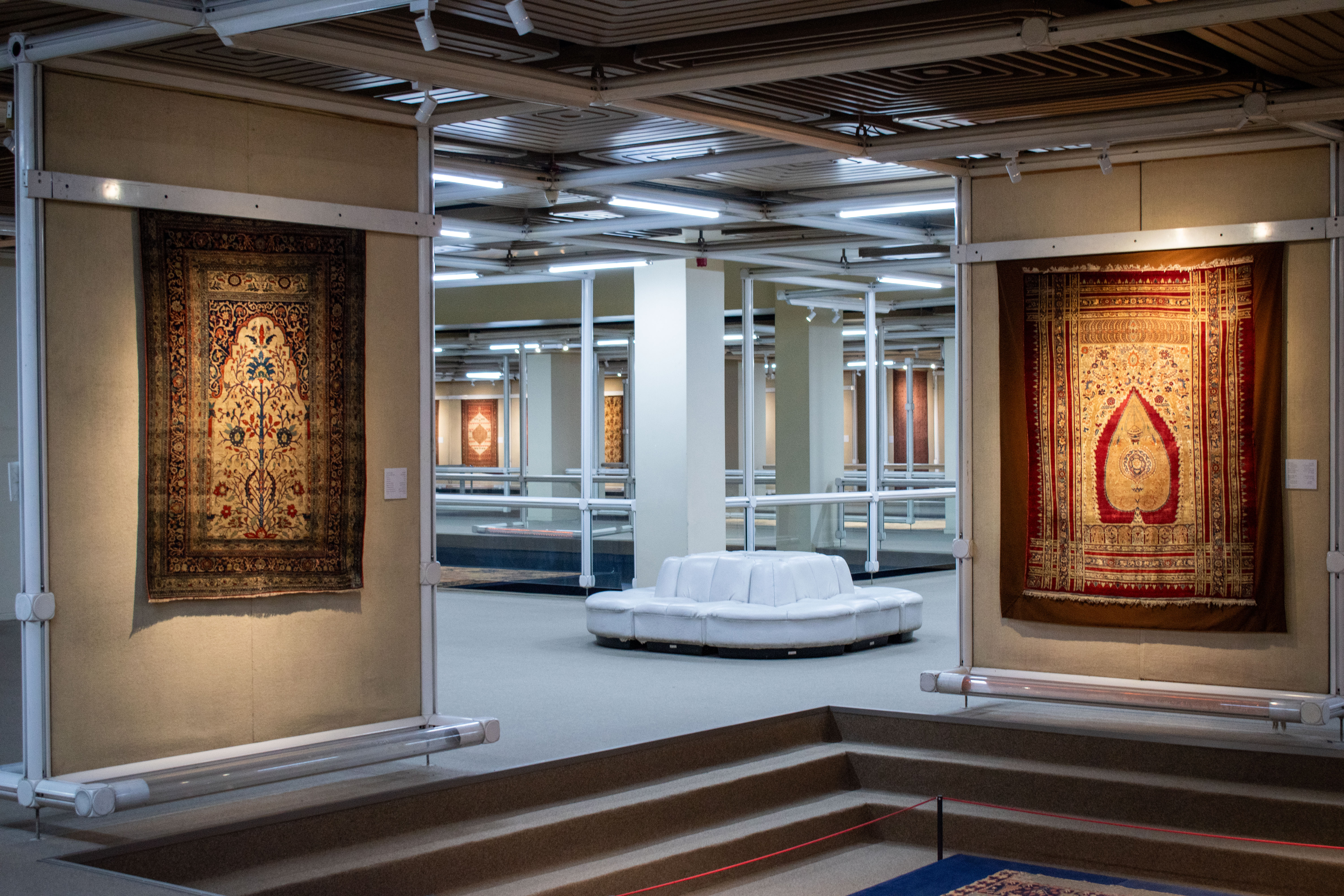

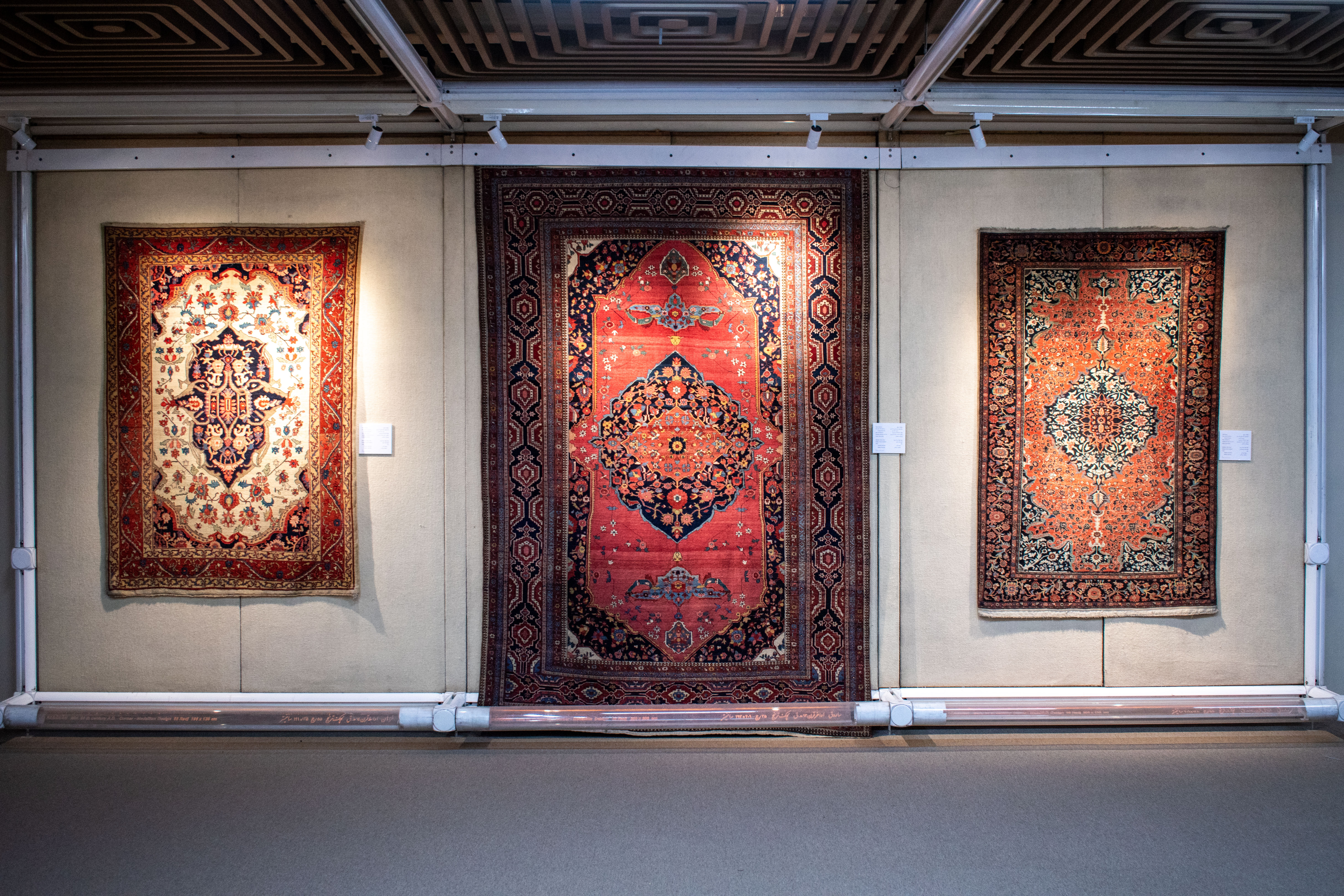

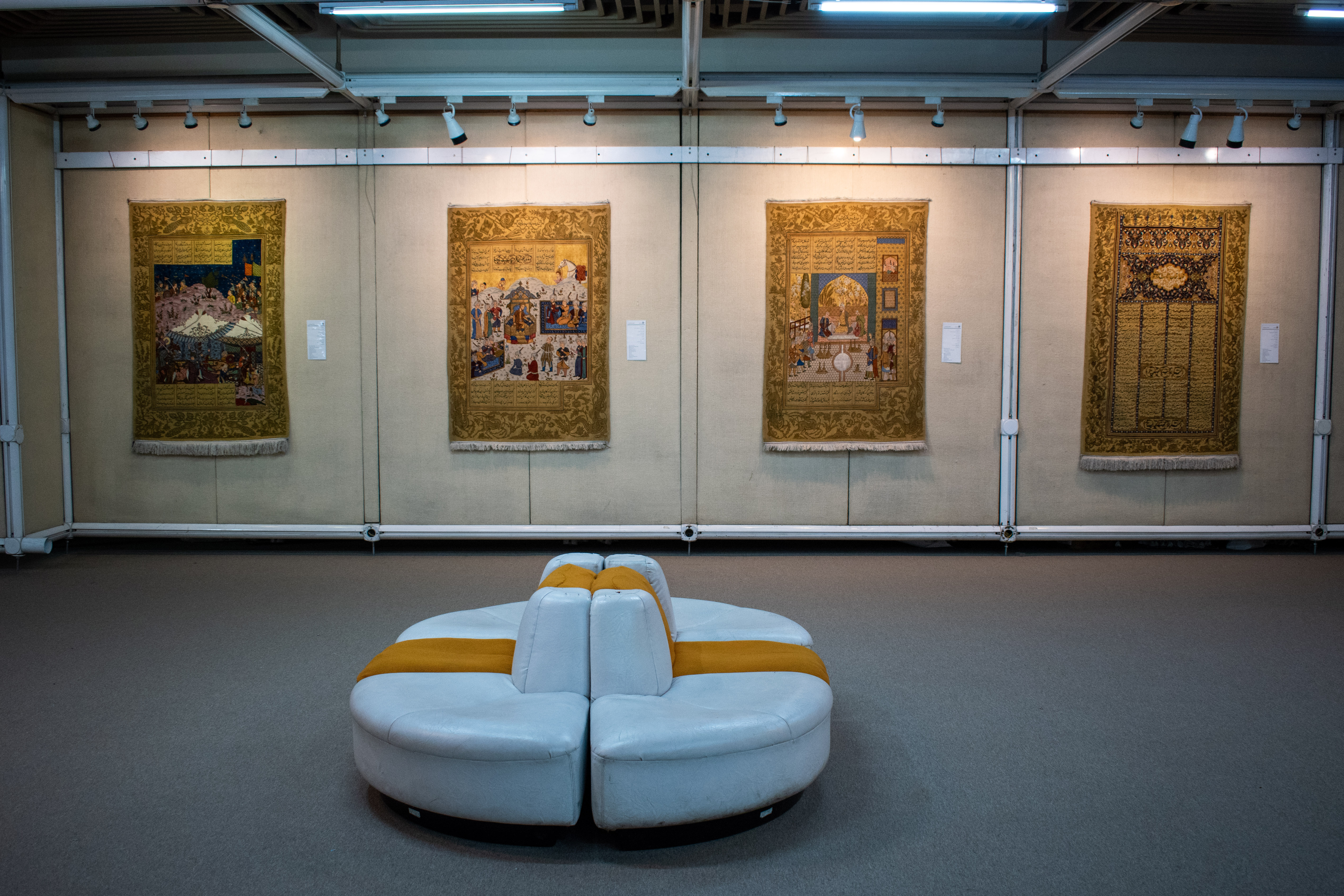

== See also ==
- Iran National Heritage Organization
- List of museums in Iran
