= Safir Office Machines Museum =

Gallery in Tehran, Iran

- موزه ماشین‌های اداری سفیر
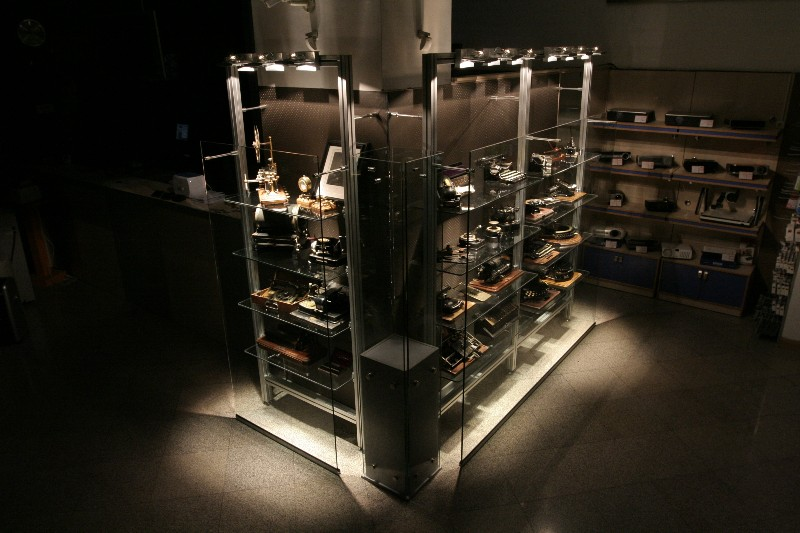
- Established: 2008
- Location: Iranshahr Street, Tehran, Iran
- Website: http://www.officemuseum.ir/

The Safir Office Machines Museum is a private museum in Tehran, Iran. It was founded in 2008. It includes a collection of office machines.

== Collection ==
There are more than 80 devices such as typewriters, check writers, pencil sharpeners, duplicators, calculators, cash registers, telegraph equipment, telephones, among others, in the collection.

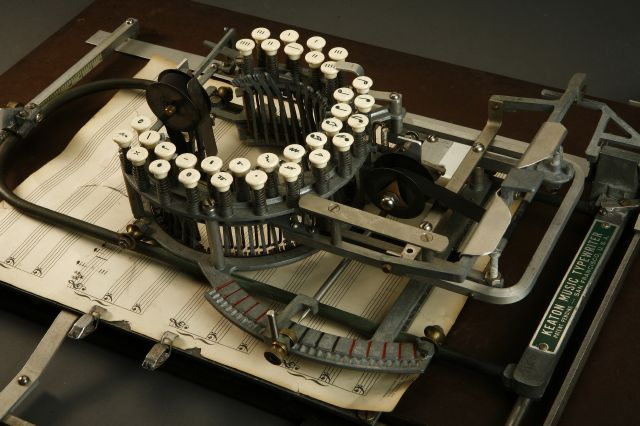
Keton Music Typewriter, 1953 U.S.A

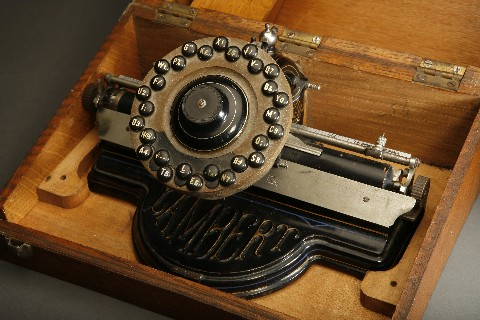
Lambert Typewriter, 1900 U.S.A

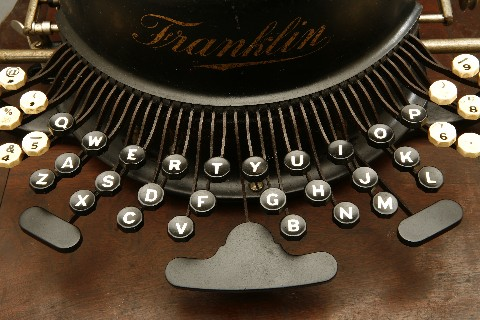
Franklin 7 Typewriter, 1897 U.S.A

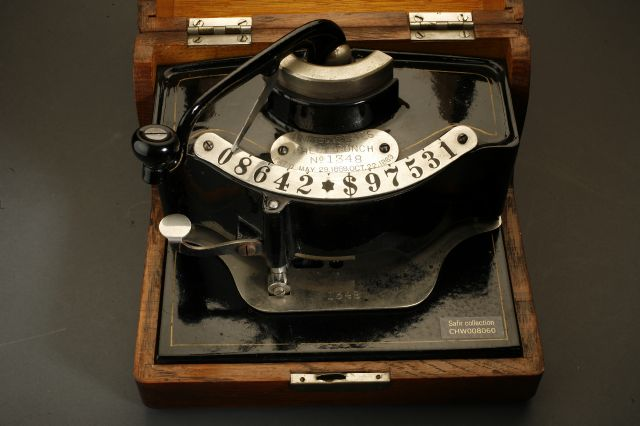
United States Check Punch, 1888 U.S.A

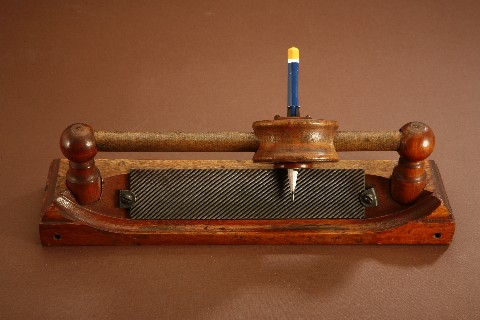
Perfect Pencil Pointer Pencil Sharpener, 1890 U.S.A

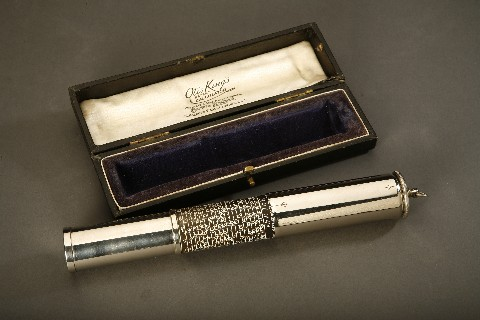
Otis King`s Calculator, 1921 England

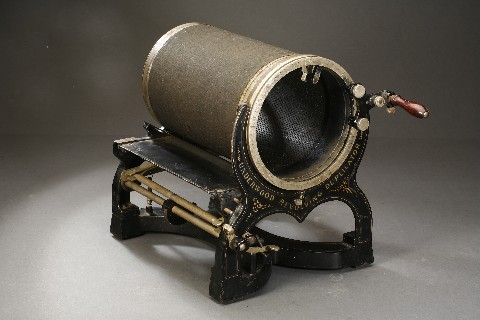
Underwood Duplicator, 1908 U.S.A

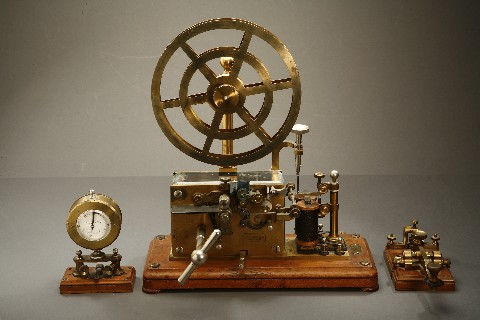
L.M. ERICSSON Telegraph, 1908 Sweden

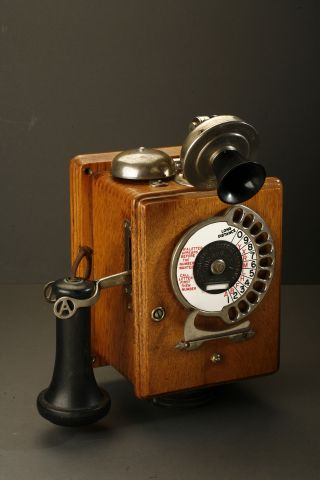
AUTOMATIC ELECTRIC Telephone, (early 20th century) U.S.A

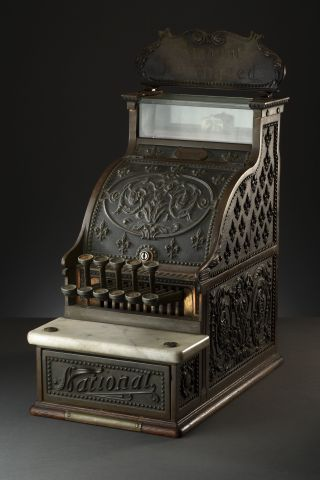
NCR Cash Register, 1911 U.S.A

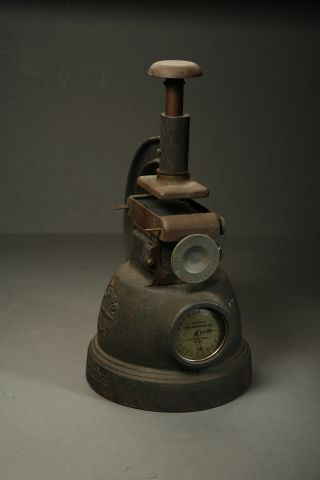
Simplex Time Recorder, 1928 U.S.A

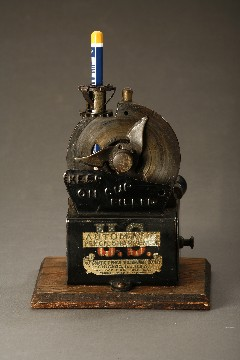
U.S. Automatic Pencil Sharpener, 1906 U.S.A

== See also ==
- Tehran Museum of Contemporary Art
- Iran Cultural Heritage Organization
