= Parvin Barzin =

Iranian archaeologist and museum curator

- پروین برزین
- Born: 1919/20; Tehran, Iran
- Died: 2003/04
- Education: University of Tehran; University of Pennsylvania
- Scientific career
- Fields: Archaeology, Islamic archaeology

Parvin Barzin (Persian: پروین برزین; c. 1919/20–2003/04) was an Iranian archaeologist, museum curator and scholar. She was a pioneering woman in Iranian archaeology and museology, and the first woman to serve as an official representative of the Iranian government on an archaeological excavation. During David Stronach's first season of excavations at Pasargadae in 1961, Barzin served as the representative of the Iranian Archaeological Department.

== Early life and education ==
Barzin was born in Tehran in 1919–20. Her mother died when she was young, and she and her two brothers were raised by their father, an employee of the Ministry of Industries and Arts. His work took the family to Isfahan, where Barzin completed her secondary education at the Behesht Ayin school.

After secondary school, Barzin joined the newly established Museum of Ancient Iran as a translator. While employed at the museum, encouraged by Mohammad Taqi Mostafavi, archaeologist and museum director, she continued her studies in archaeological studies at the University of Tehran.

In 1959, the Iranian Council of Ministers approved her travel to the United States on a one-year scholarship provided by the University Museum of the University of Pennsylvania for scientific study.

== Museum and archaeological career ==
Following her return to Iran, Barzin resumed work at the Museum of Ancient Iran, where she was involved in cataloguing, documenting and studying the museum's Islamic collections. She finally became curator of the Islamic Department.

Barzin participated in the first season of the British Institute of Persian Studies excavations at Pasargadae, directed by David Stronach from 16 October to 16 December 1961. In his preliminary report, Stronach described "Miss Parveen Barzin" as "an experienced member of the staff of the National Museum in Tehran" who acted as the representative of the Archaeological Department.

Her museum work extended beyond Tehran. She was involved in establishing or arranging regional museums at Kashan, Urmia and Miandoab, as well as in the display and organization of the museum in Tabriz. During the final years of her career, she worked at the museum in the Shahyad (later Azadi) Tower, where she served in a deputy administrative position.

Barzin also represented Iranian museums and cultural institutions at exhibitions of Iranian art abroad, including the travelling exhibition 7,000 Years of Iranian Art, during which she and fellow museum curator Noushindokht Nafisi gave lectures about the exhibited objects.

== Research and publications ==
Barzin published numerous articles on Iranian archaeology, museum collections and the history of art. Her subjects included ceramics, metalwork, textiles, carpets, Islamic art, Qur'an manuscripts and the interpretation of ancient Iranian imagery.

== Death and legacy ==
Barzin died in 2003–04.
