= Museum of the Islamic Era =

Museum in Tehran, Iran

- موزه دوران اسلامی
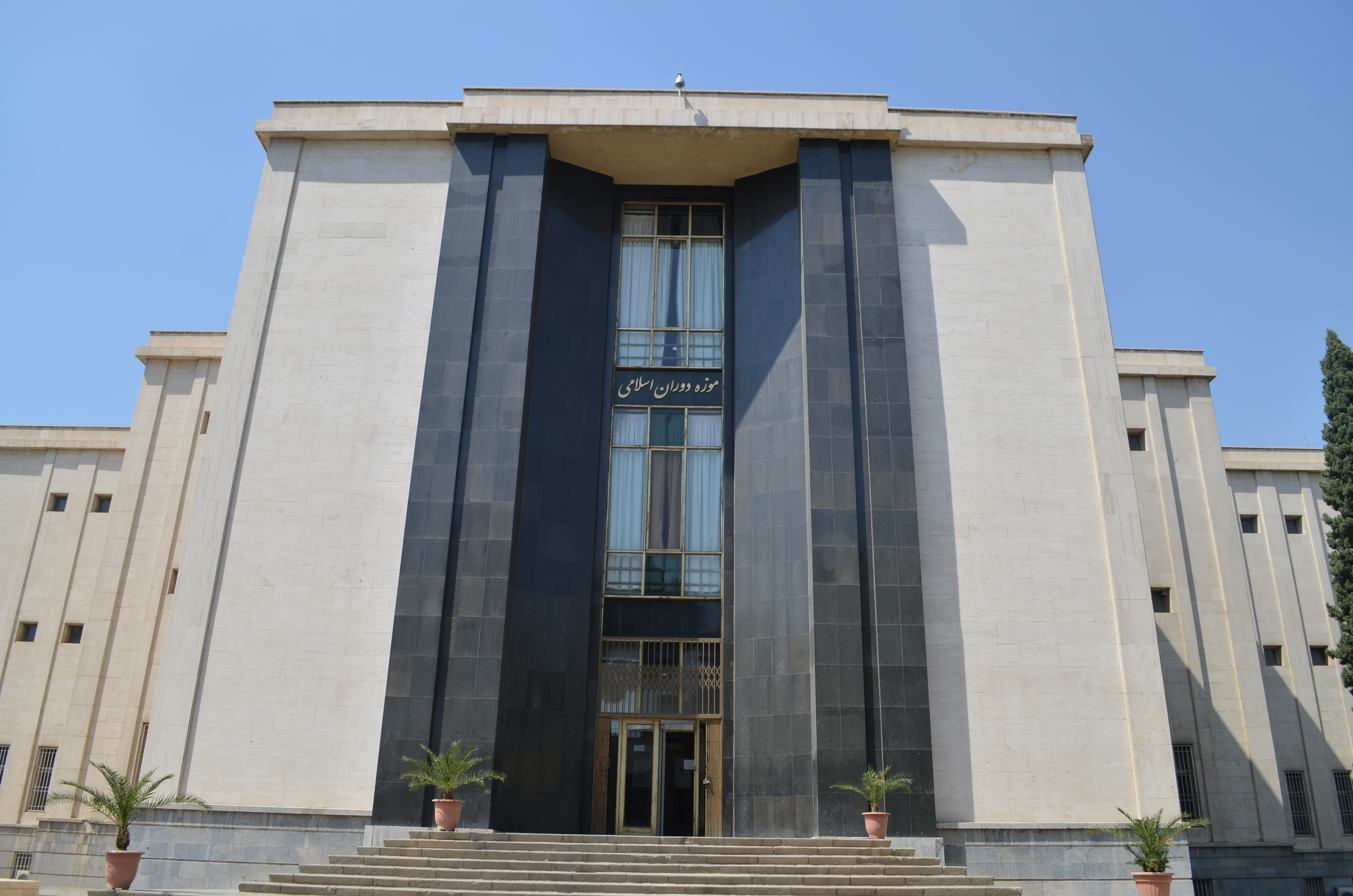
- Entrance of the Museum of the Islamic Era

- Location of the museum in the city Tehran
- Established: 1972; 51 years
- Location: National Museum of Iran, Tehran, Iran
- Coordinates: 35.687069°N 51.415413°E
- Type: National history museum
- Collections: Timurid; Safavid; Qajar; Islam; Seljuk; Ilkhanate; Islamic
- Public transit access: Imam Khomeini station, Line 1, Tehran Metro

The Museum of the Islamic Era (Persian: موزه دوران اسلامی) is one of the museums of the National Museum of Iran, located near Imam Khomeini Square, Tehran, Iran. Most of the objects in this museum are selected from the works of scientific excavations or prestigious collections such as Sheikh Safi al-Din Khānegāh and Shrine Ensemble. The National Museum of Iran has two main sections: Museum of Ancient Iran and Museum of the Islamic Era; The Museum of the Islamic Era is dedicated to displaying historical monuments and objects of Islamic Iran.

In the Museum of the Islamic Era, a large section is dedicated to the Qurans and manuscripts, in which gold-plated Qurans with Kufic scripts of early Islam can be seen. In another part, there are inscriptions of manuscripts or Quran and hadiths in the form of Epigraphy or Mihrab.

== History ==
The construction of the Museum of the Islamic Era began in 1944 and was inspired by the Sasanian palace of Bishapur, in the grounds of the National Museum of Iran, and in 1950, with an area of about 4,000 square meters and three floors, its building was constructed. This building was equipped for the purpose of establishing the Museum of the Islamic Era and was inaugurated in 1996, but on 22 June 2006, with the aim of improving and completing the facilities, expanding some spaces and reviewing the display of works, the museum was closed for nine years and reopened on 29 August 2015.

== Structure ==
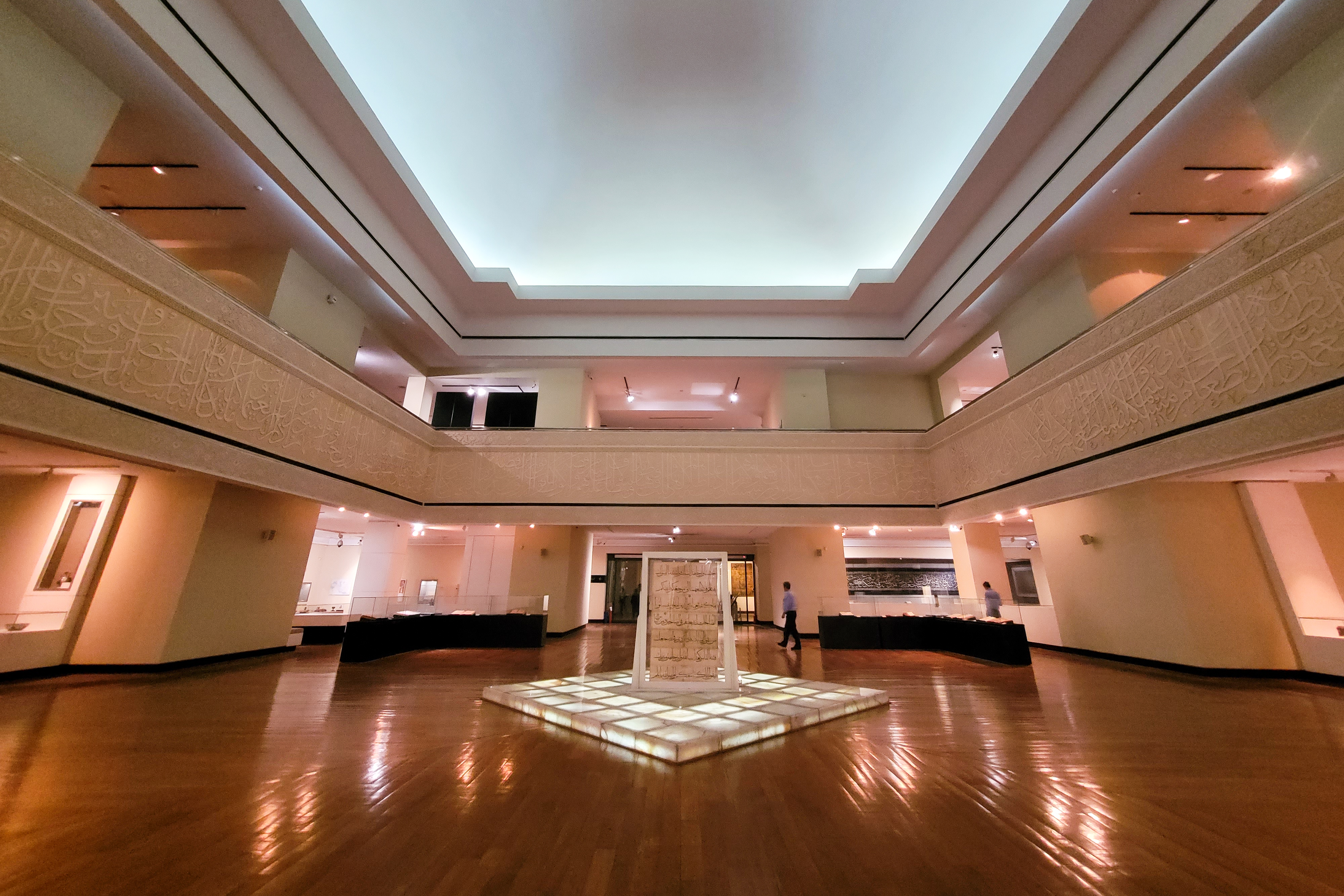
The main hall.

The Museum of the Islamic Era has three floors, the ground floor of which includes a meeting hall and temporary exhibition halls, and the first and second floors of the museum also has a total of seven halls. The halls in the first floor are the Quran Hall, Timurid Hall, Safavid Halls and Qajar Halls. The halls in the second floor are Early Islamic Halls, Seljuk Halls and Ilkhanid Halls. The museum has 170 showcases with 1,500 historical objects arranged in a historical schedule.

== Collection ==
The orientation of the museum starts from the second floor and is sorted chronologically.

The first room in front of the entrance of the first floor is the Quran Hall. There is Timurid Hall on the right and three halls on the left belong to Qajar dynasty history. The next three halls after Timurid Hall on the right belong to the Safavid dynasty history. An important part of the first floor is dedicated to the manuscripts of the gilded Qurans and the Kufic scripts of early Islam. There are also examples of manuscripts related to scientific, literary and historical books, and topics such as painting, calligraphy, writing instruments, medical and astronomical tools, textiles, lighting fixtures, pottery and arts made of metal, tiles, plastered altars and various utensils.

At the entrance of the second floor there is a very large painting of an Iranian traditional coffee house. The first and second hall on the right is related to works of the beginning of Islam in Iran and the next two halls belong to Seljuk dynasty history. Three halls on the left belong to Ilkhanate history. The objects in this floor are arranged with an emphasis on the architectural decorations of the Islamic period.

The museum contains a total of about 1,500 historical objects, collected from monuments and archaeological excavations and kept in 170 showcases.

== Gallery ==
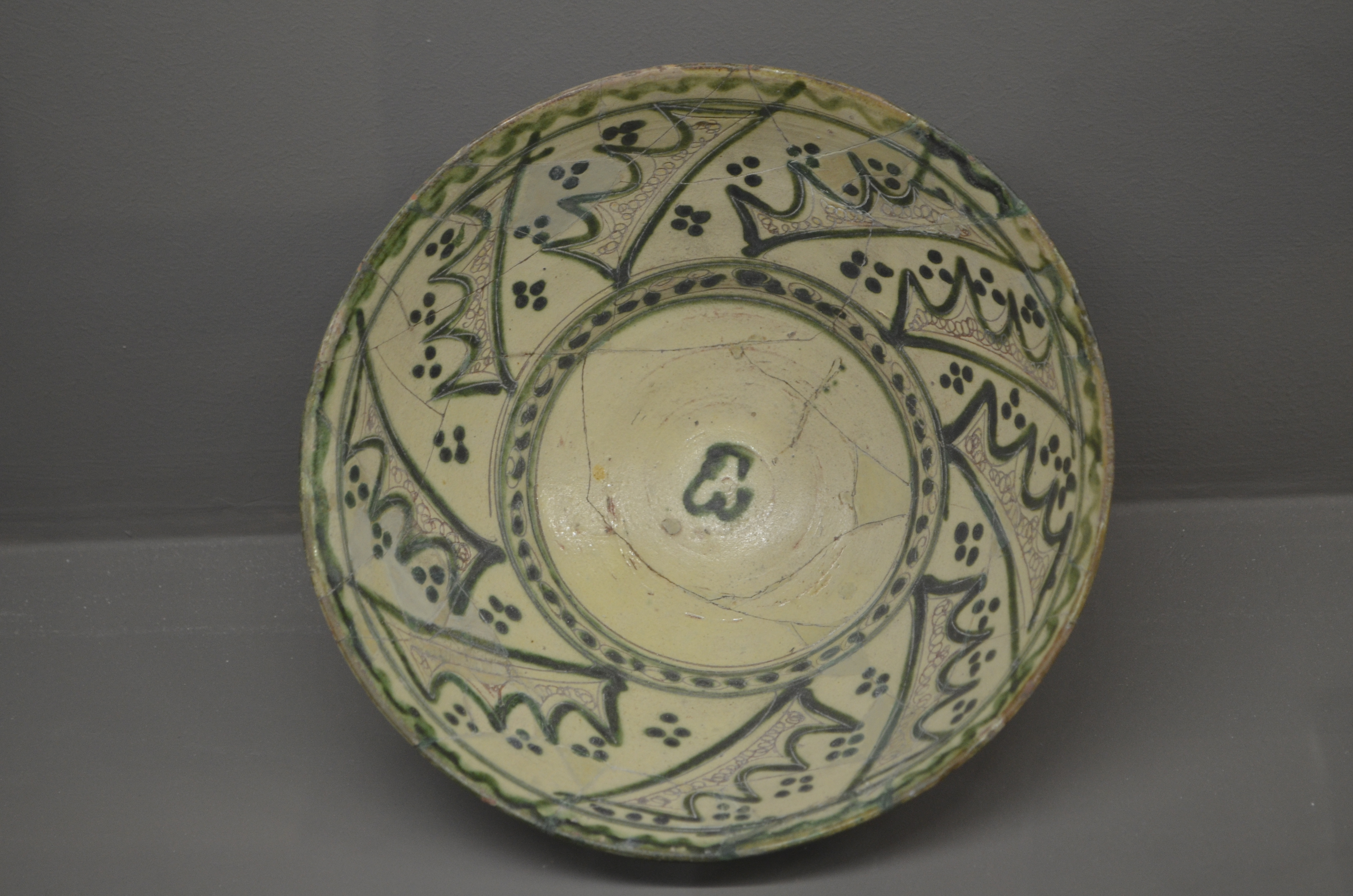

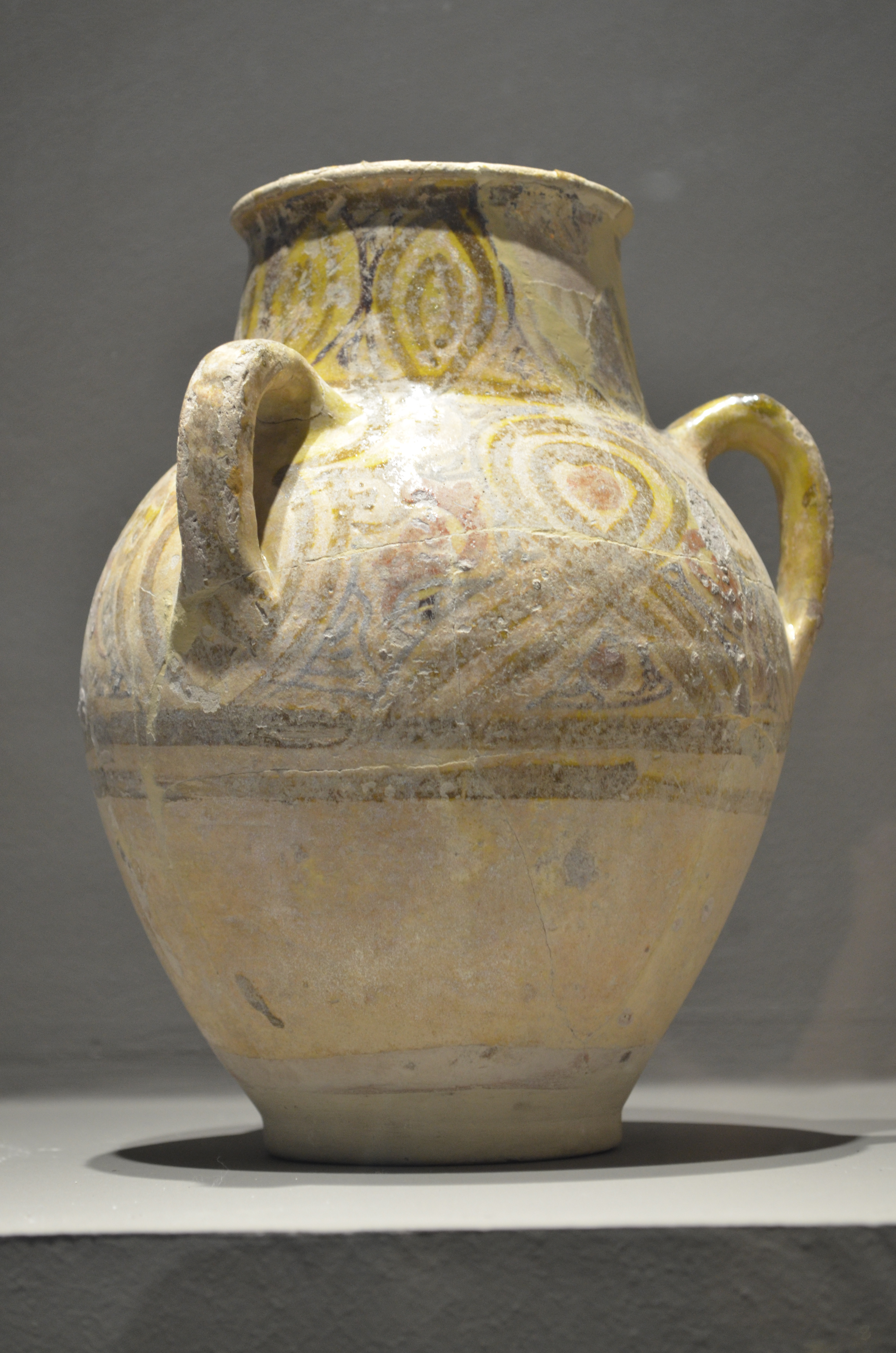

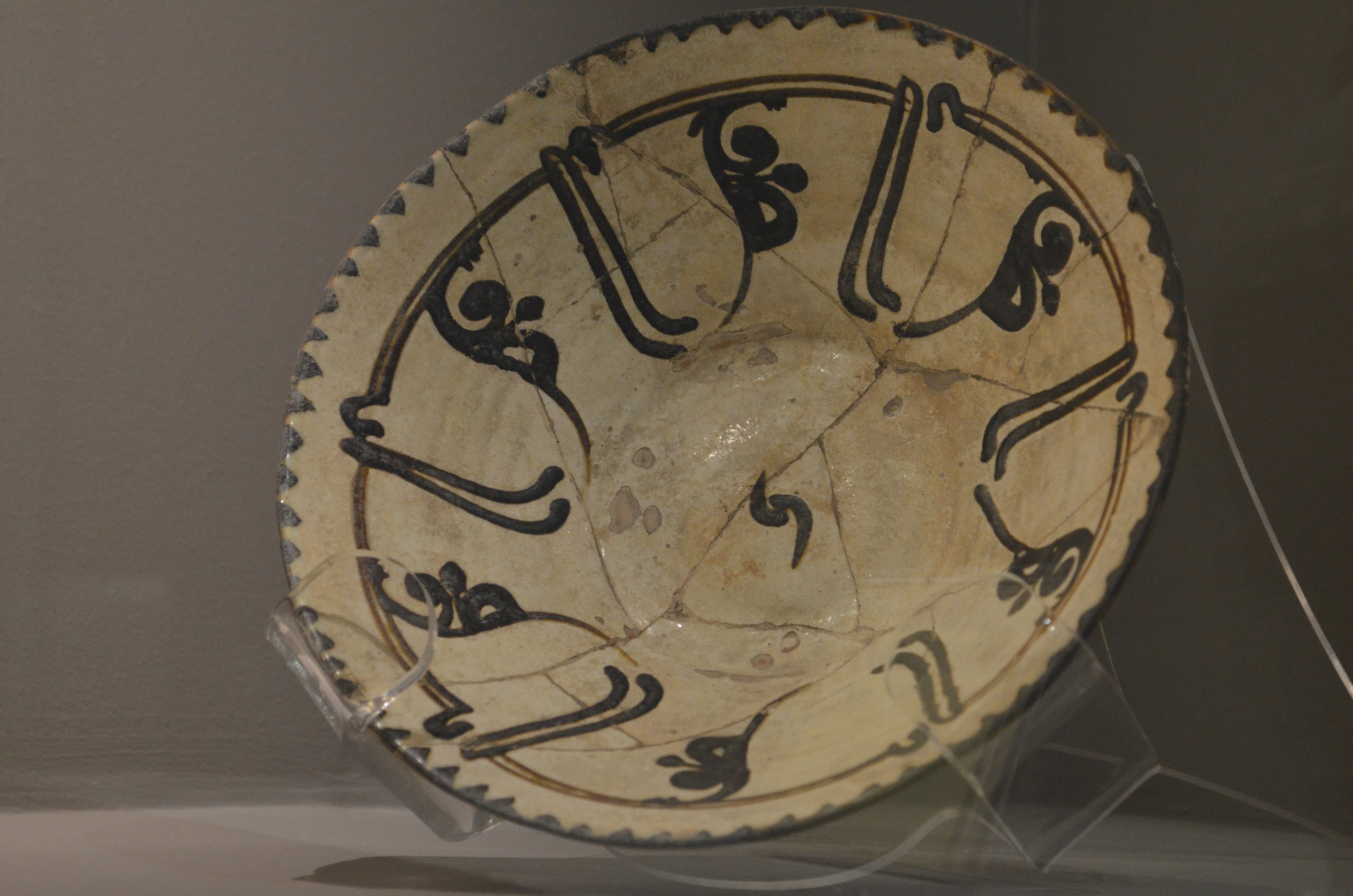

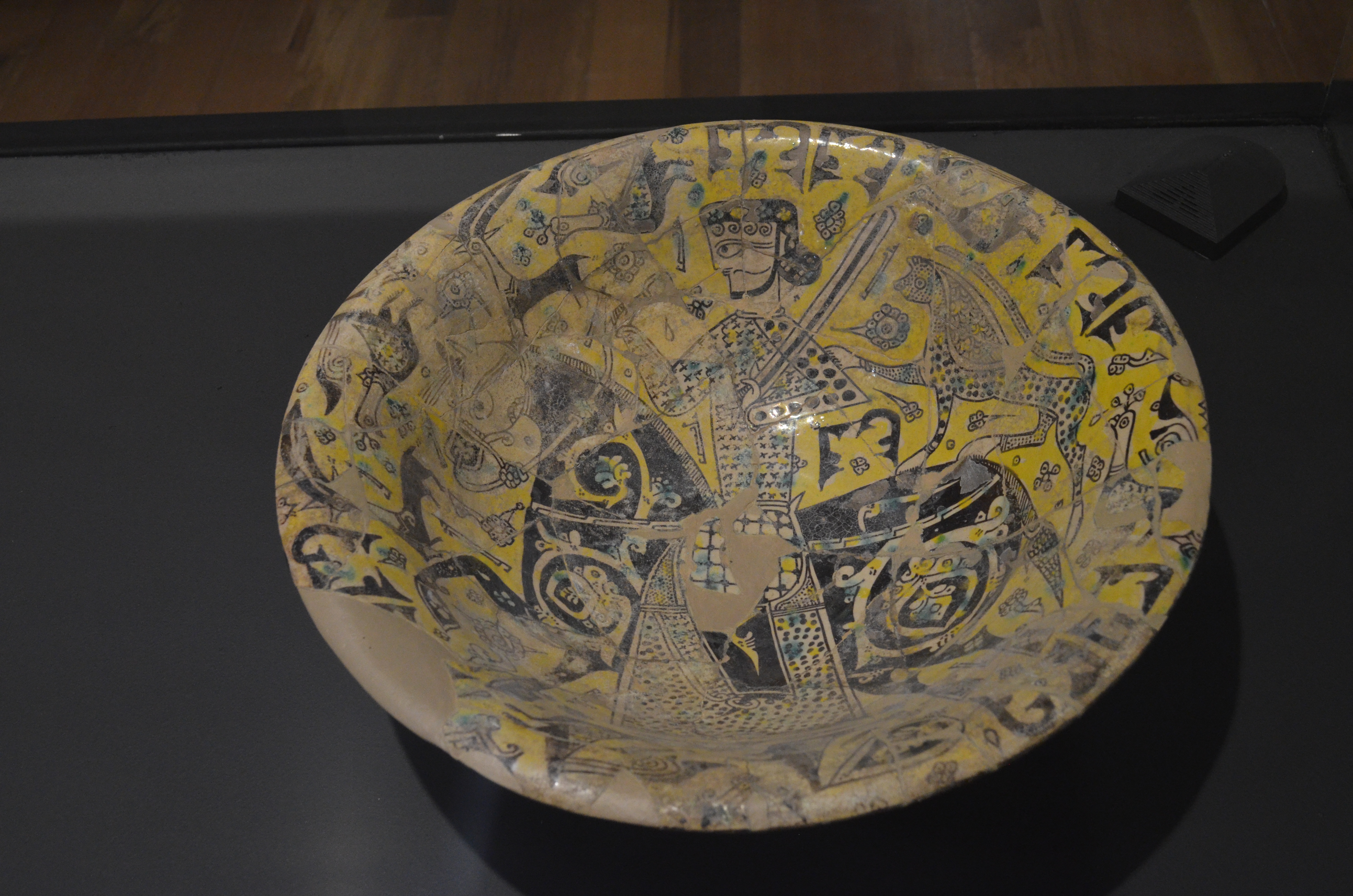

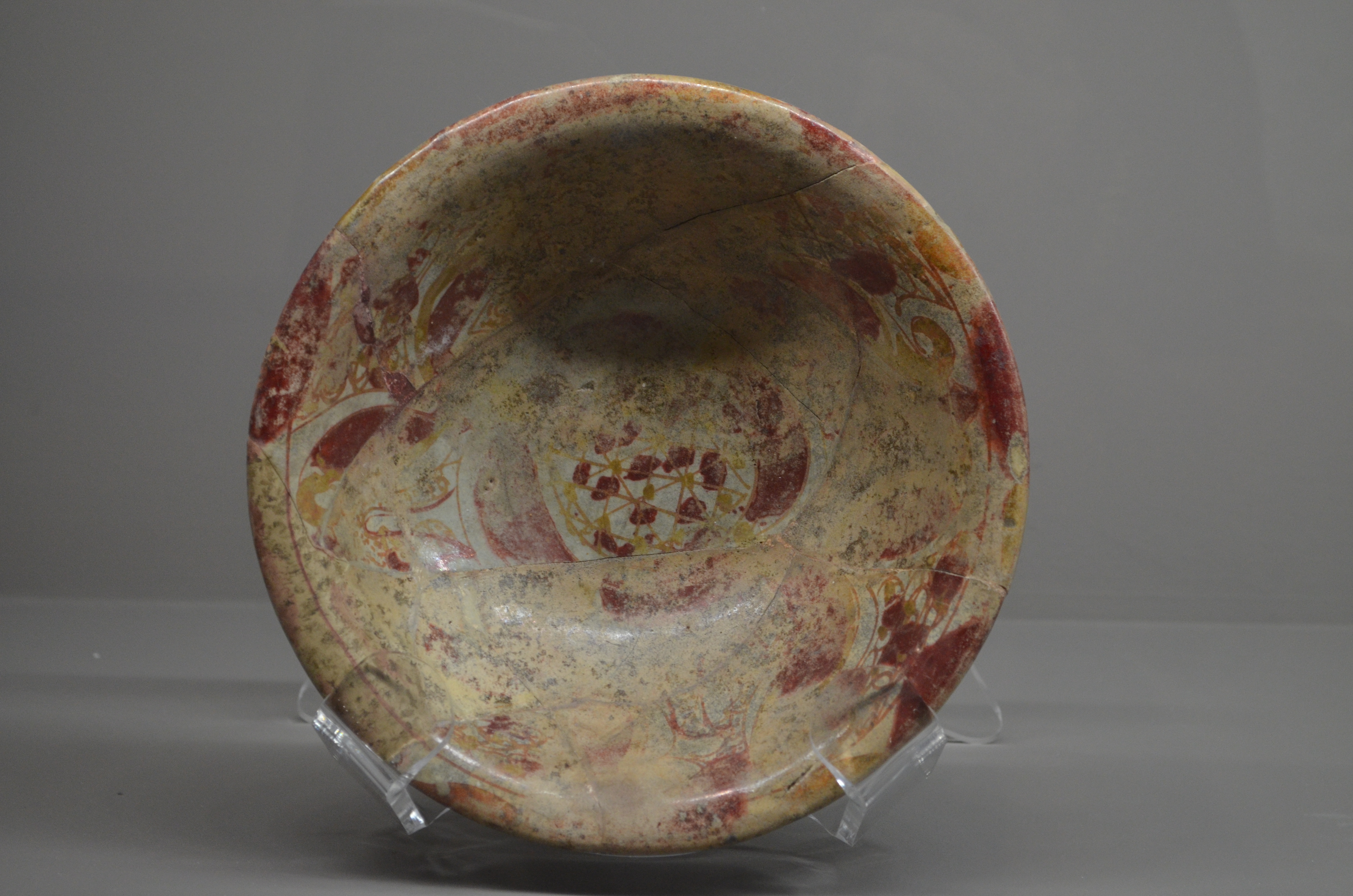

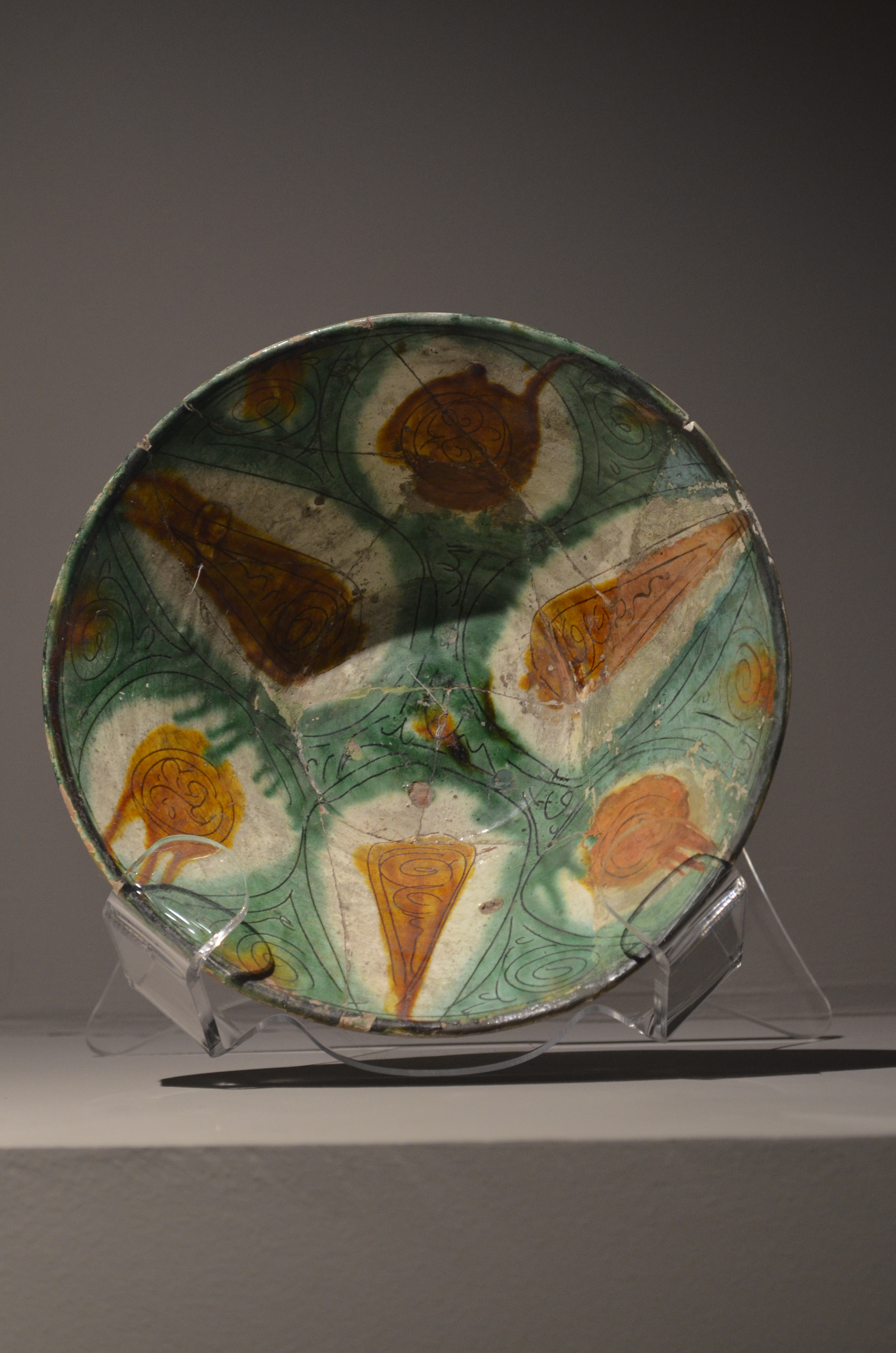

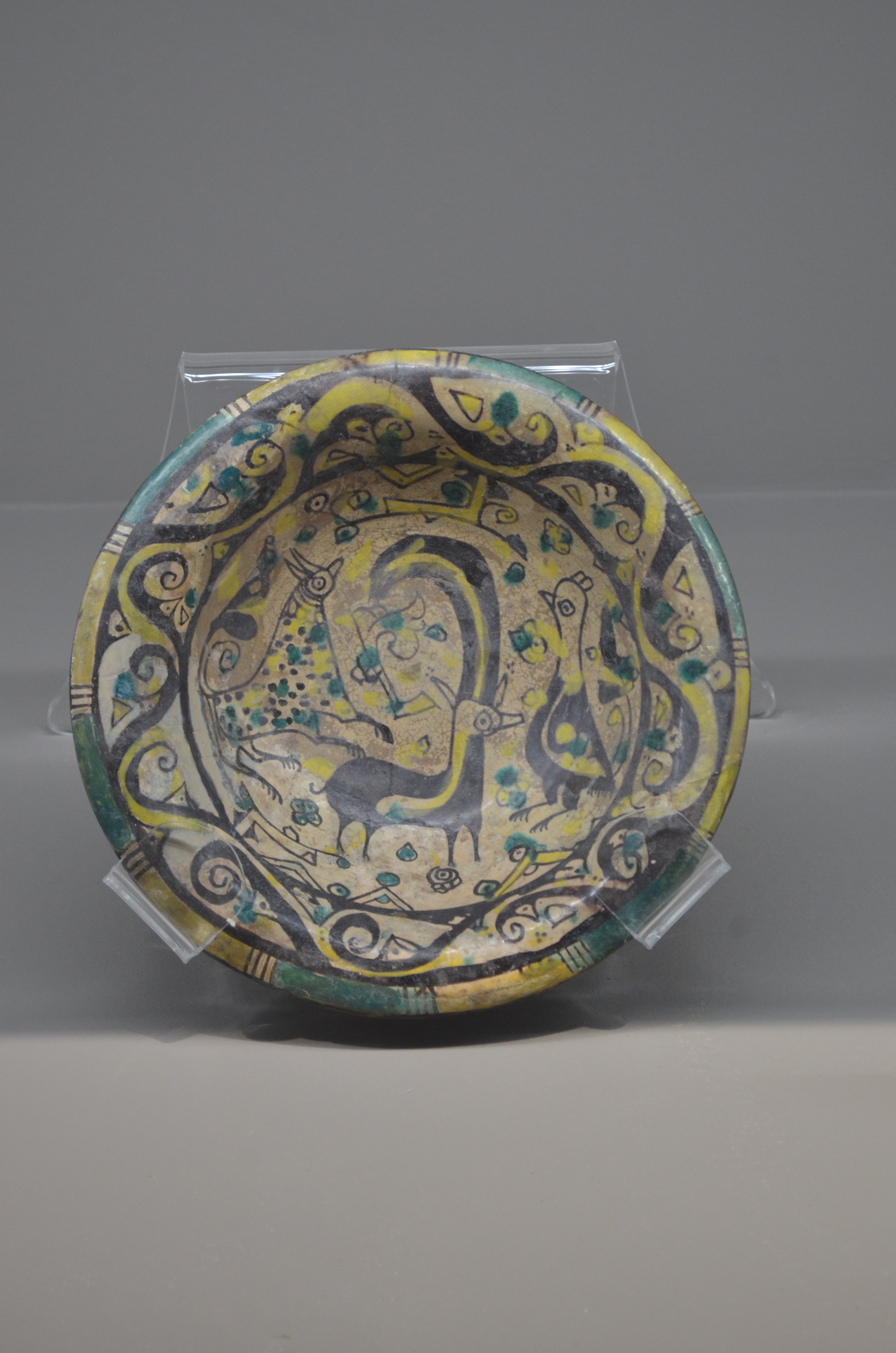

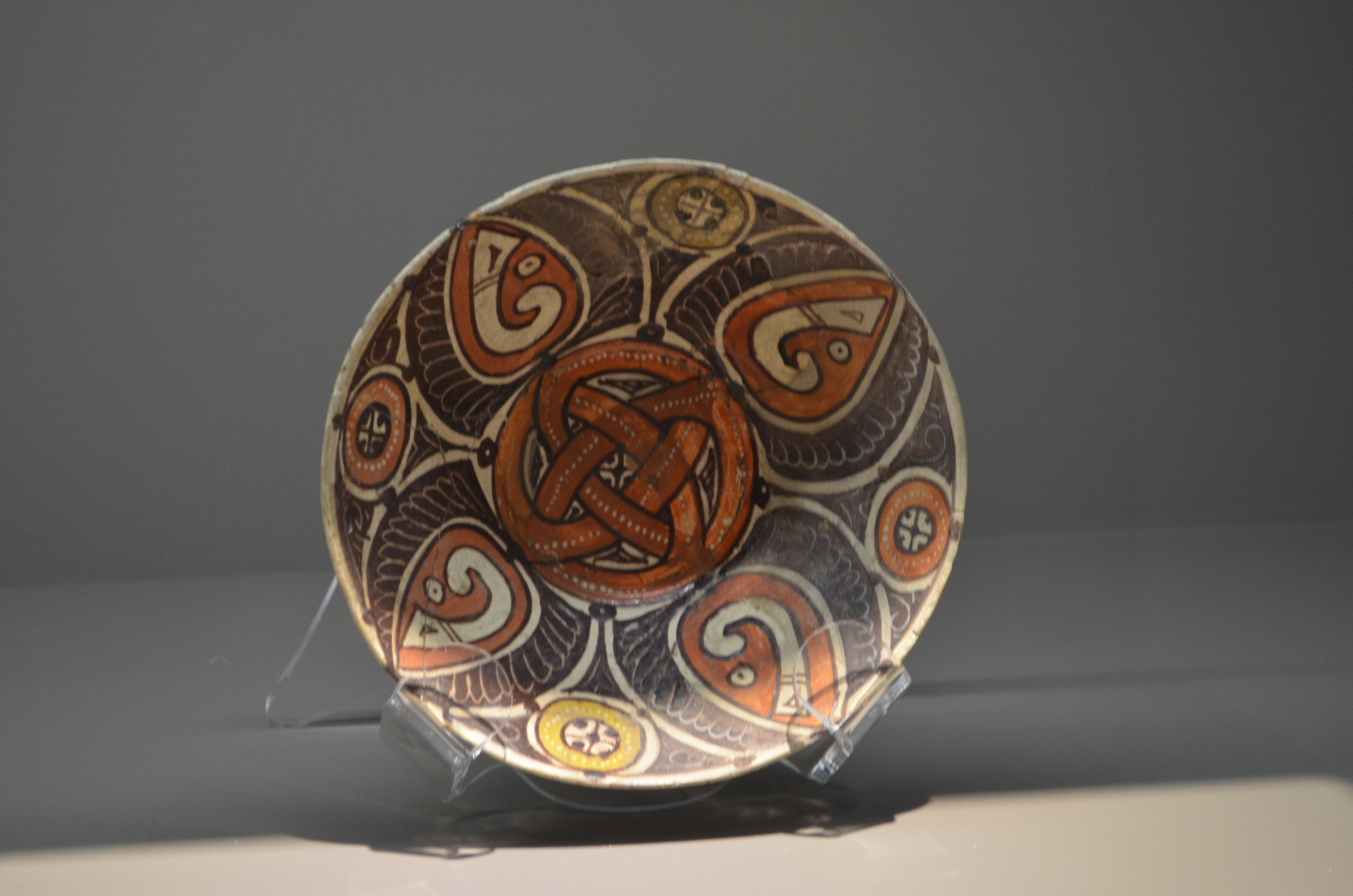

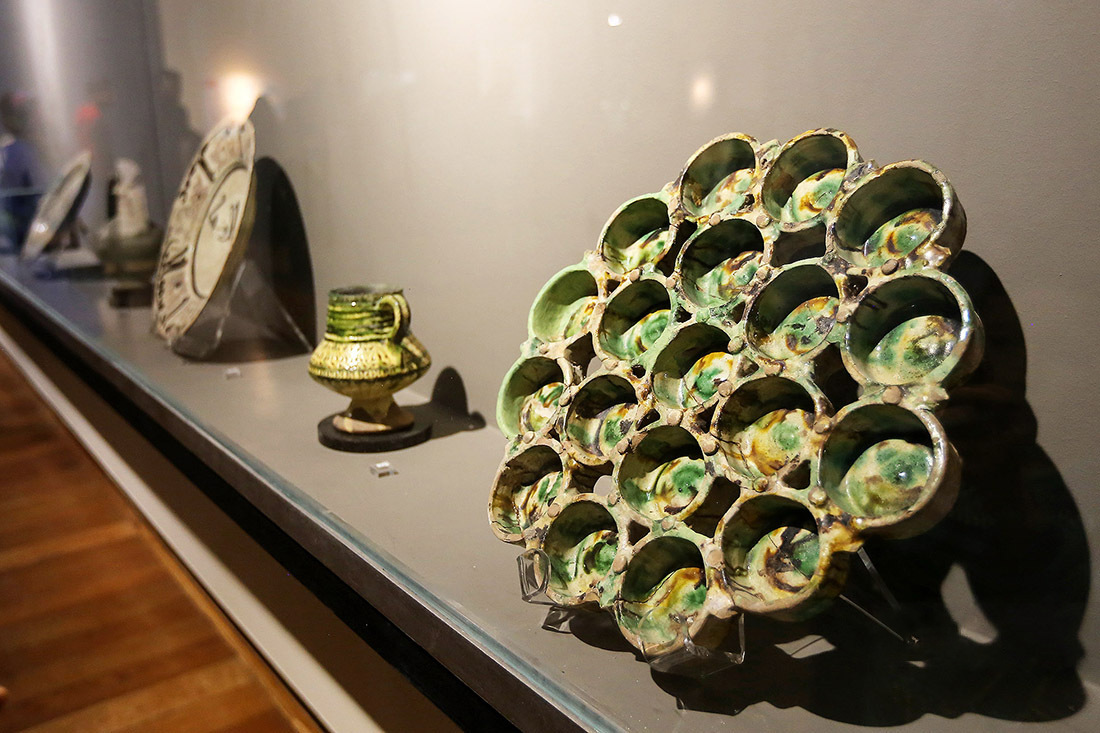

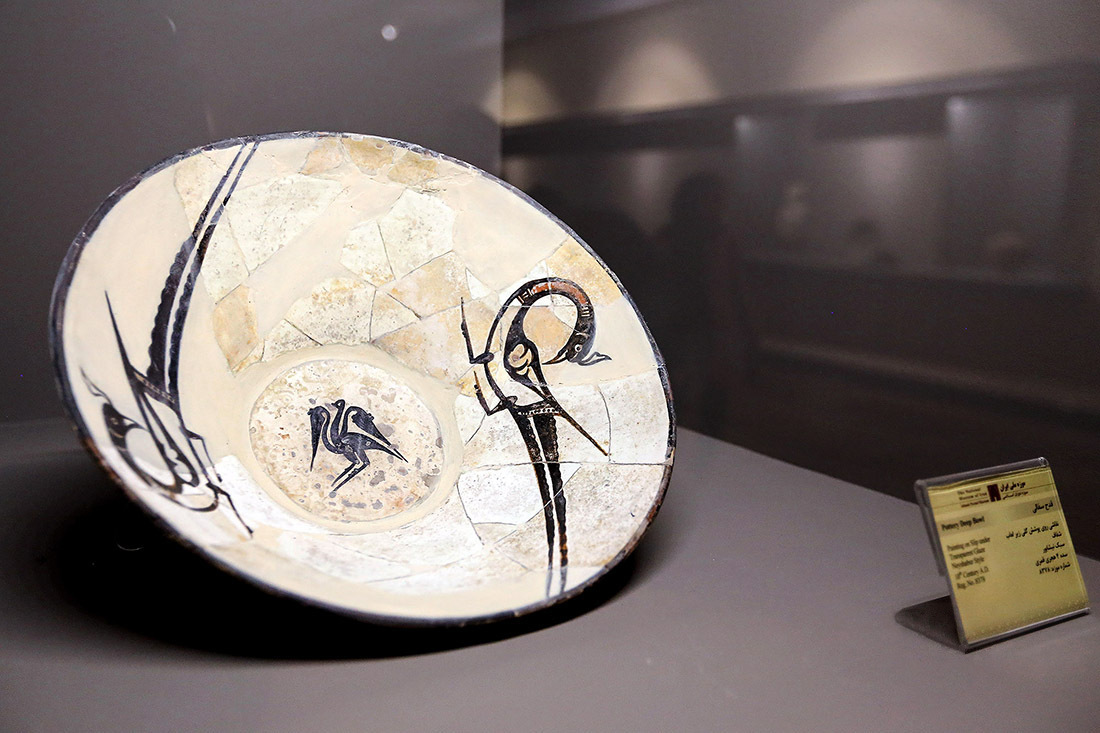

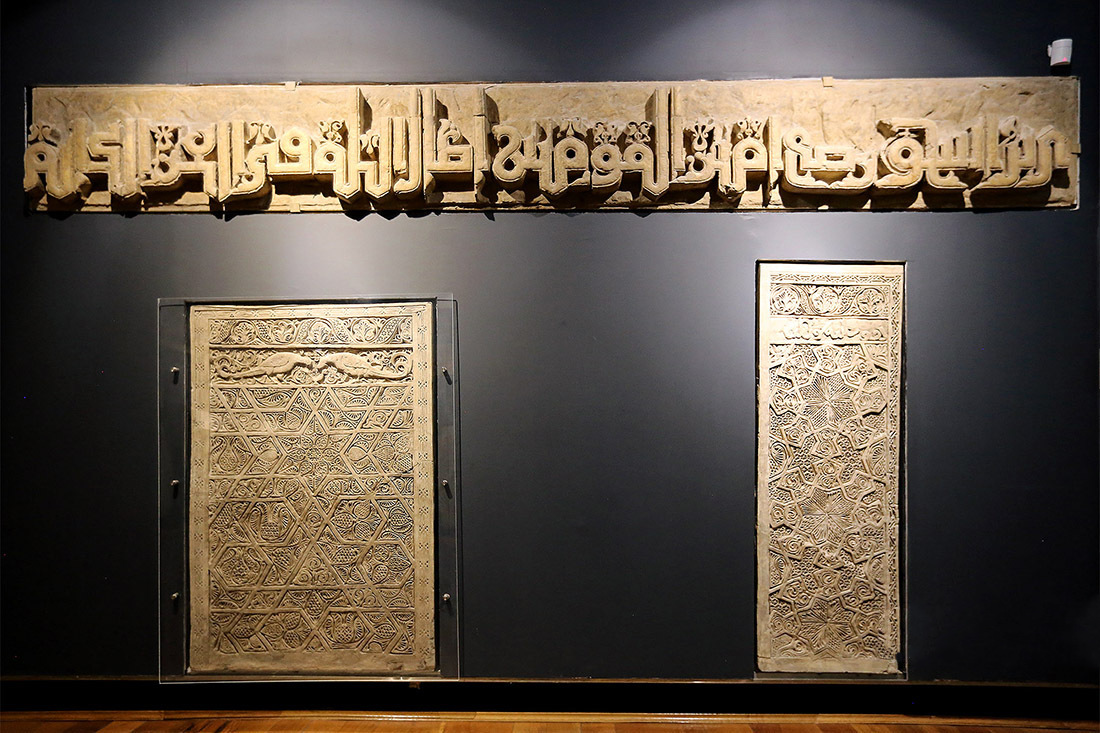

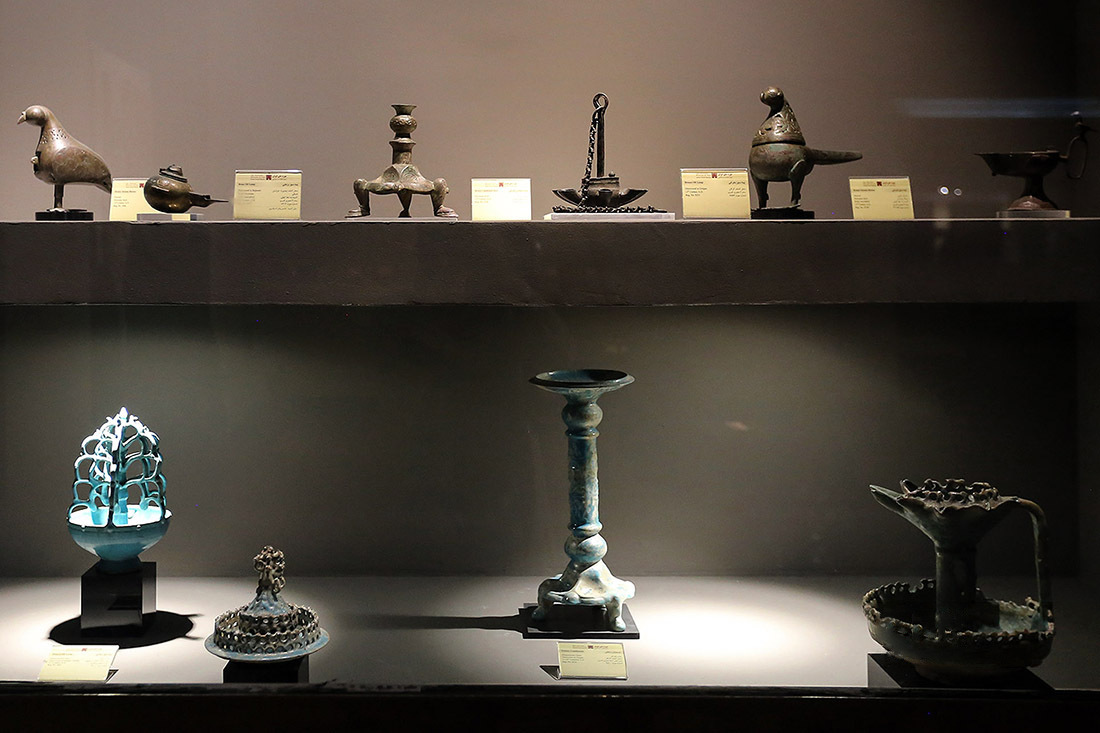

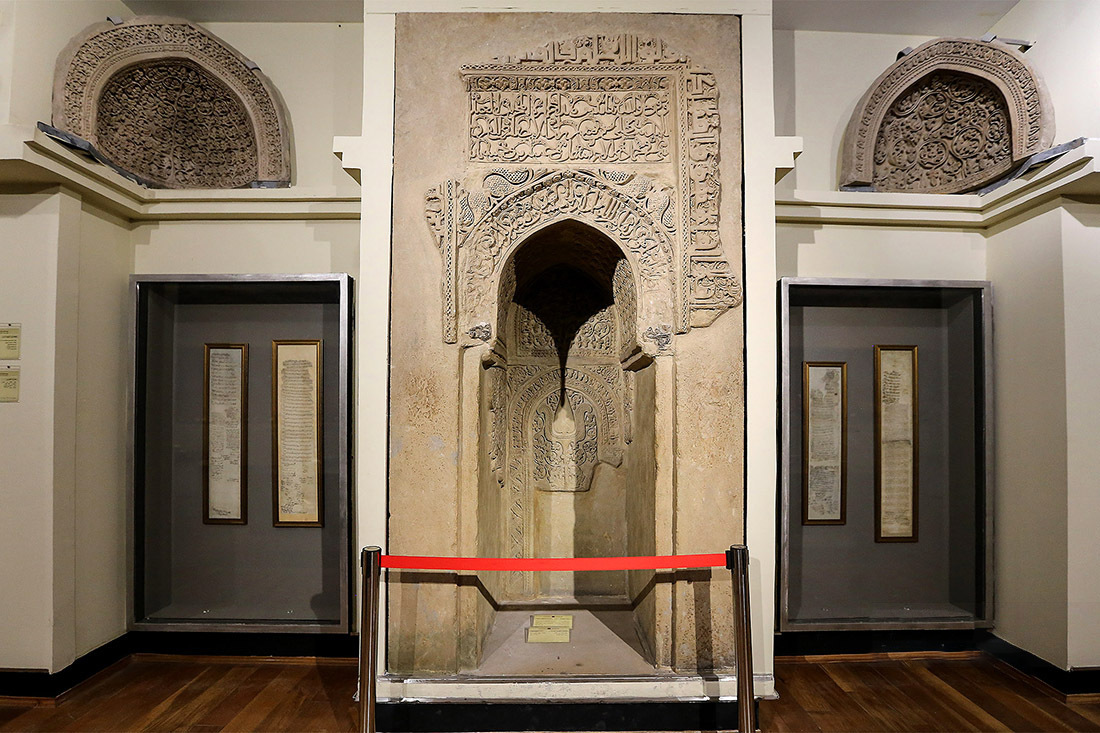

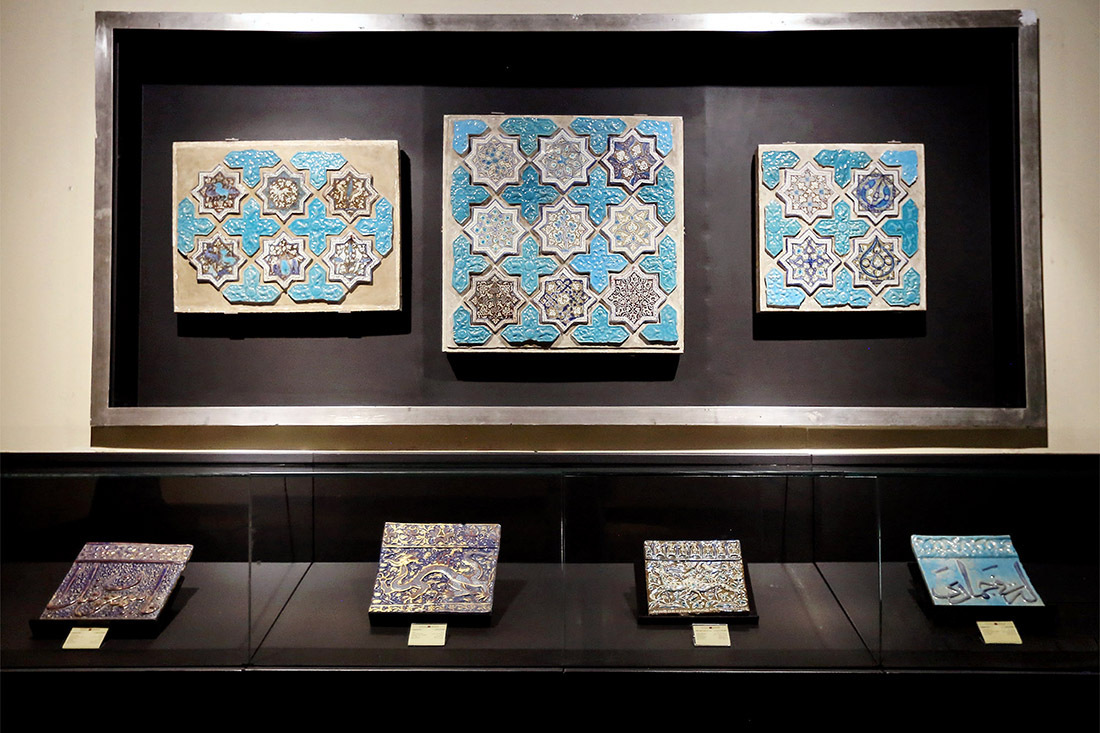

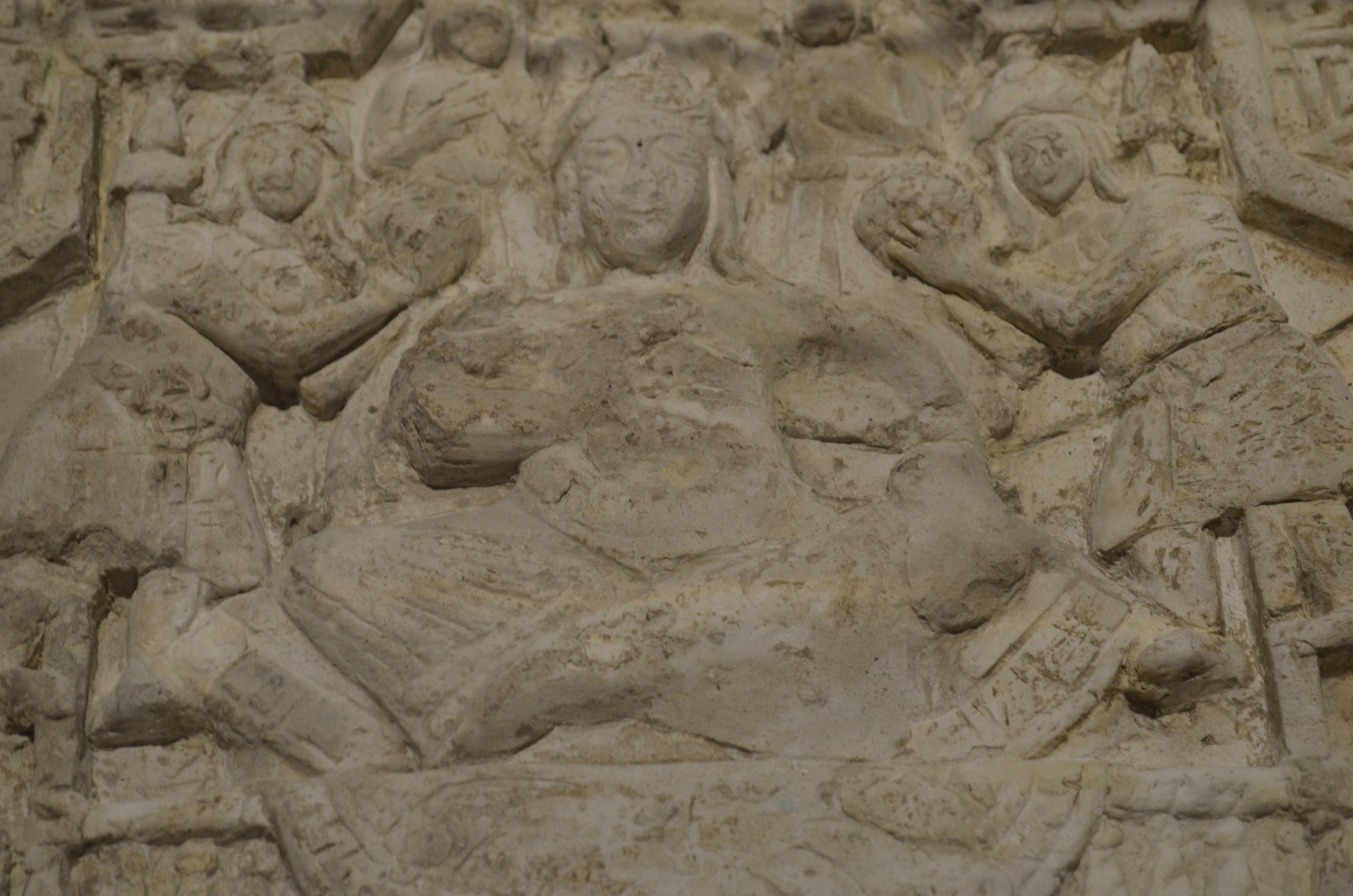

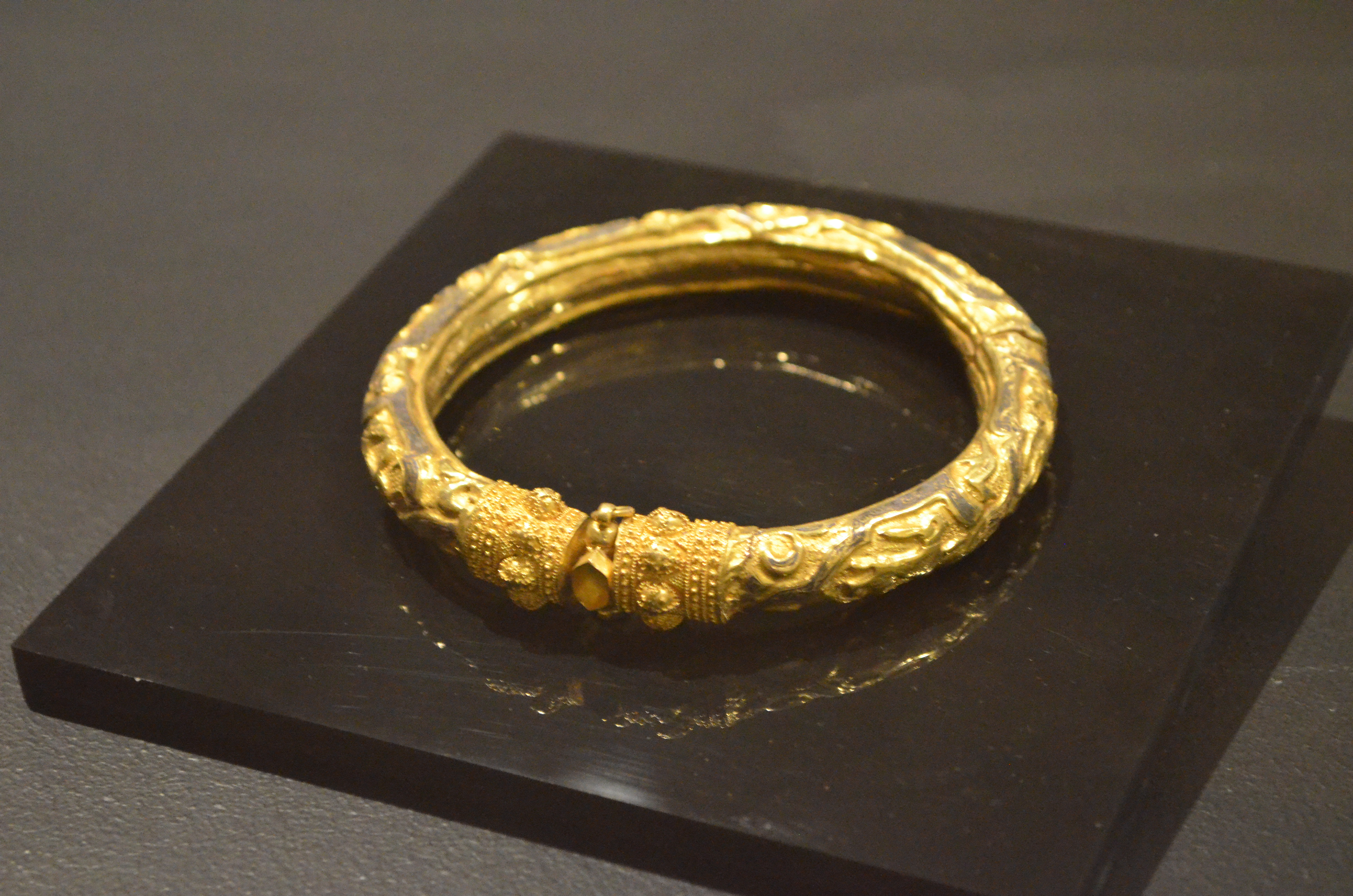

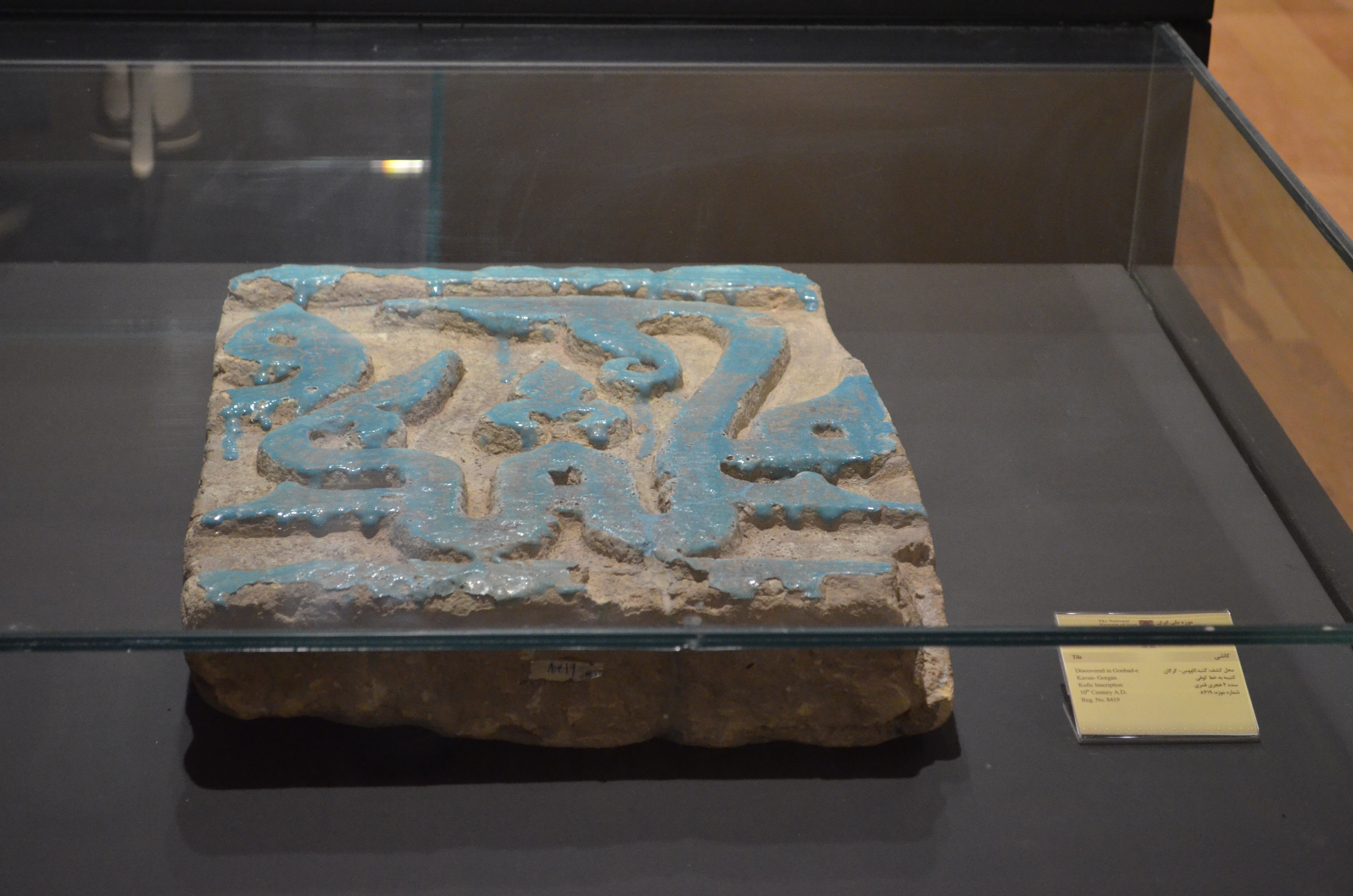

== See also ==
- Tehran Peace Museum
- Reza Abbasi Museum
- Mahmoud Hessabi museum
- Iranian National Museum of Medical Sciences History
- Abgineh Museum of Tehran
