= Mahmoud Hessabi Museum =

Museum in Tehran, Iran

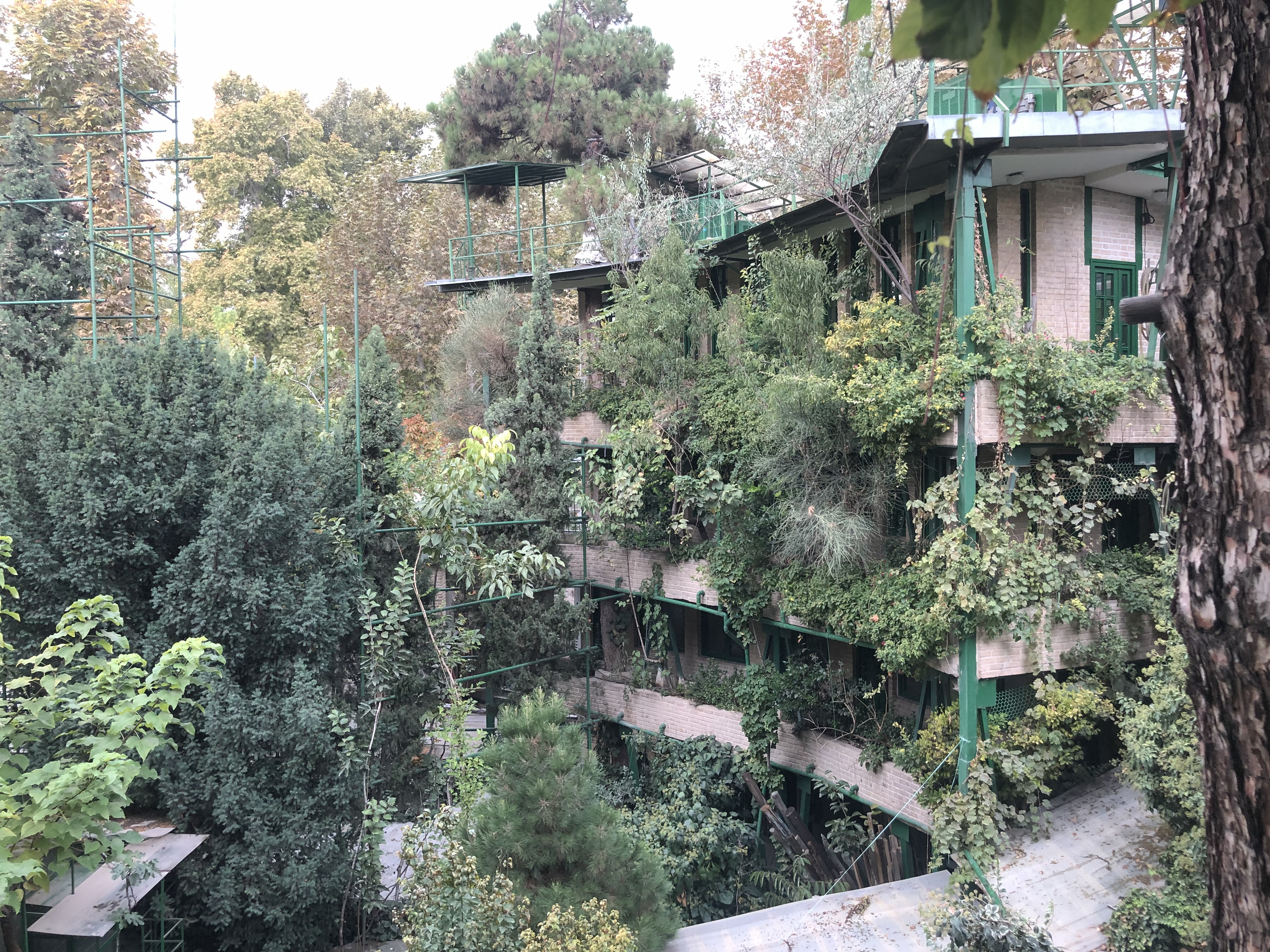
- Location: Tehran, Iran
- Coordinates: 35°47′57″N 51°25′31″E
- Type: biographical museum house
- Director: Iraj Hessabi
- Location of Mahmoud Hessabi Museum

The Mahmoud Hessabi Museum (Persian: موزه محمود حسابی) is located on a street of the same name in Tajrish neighborhood, Tehran, Iran. The museum is also known as the "Mahmoud Hessabi Cultural Center".

== History ==
The Mahmoud Hessabi Museum was founded for recognition of Mahmoud Hessabi's life and work.

== See also ==
- Museum of the Islamic Era
