= David Stronach =

British archaeologist (1931–2020)

David Brian Stronach OBE FSA (10 June 1931 – 27 June 2020) was a Scottish archaeologist of ancient Iran and Iraq who became an expert on the city of Pasargadae and an emeritus professor at the University of California, Berkeley.

Born in June 1931, Stronach was the son of Ian David Stronach FRCSE and his wife Marjorie Jessie Duncan Minto, and was educated at Gordonstoun School and St John's College, Cambridge, from which he graduated Master of Arts in 1958.

From 1961 to 1963, Stronach directed the British Institute of Persian Studies' excavations at Pasargadae, where Iranian archaeologist Parvin Barzin joined the expedition as the official representative of Iran's Archaeological Department. In the 1990s, he excavated several parts of Nineveh. His scholarship earned him several honours and awards, including the invitation to deliver endowed lectures at Harvard and Columbia.

During his time in Iran, he met Ruth Vaadia (1937–2017), an Israeli archaeologist who was also working in Iran, and married her in 1966. They have two daughters, Keren and Tami. The family left at the time of the 1979 Iranian Revolution. He became Professor of Near Eastern Studies in the Graduate Division, University of California, Berkeley, in 1981 and retired in 2004. Stronach's daughter Tami played the role of "The Childlike Empress" in the 1984 film The NeverEnding Story.

He died on 27 June 2020.

== Honours ==
- Officer of the Order of the British Empire, 1975
- Fellow of the Society of Antiquaries of London
- Archaeological Institute of America Gold Medal for "Distinguished Archaeological Achievement", 2004
