= Tami Stronach =

American actor and filmmaker (born 1972)

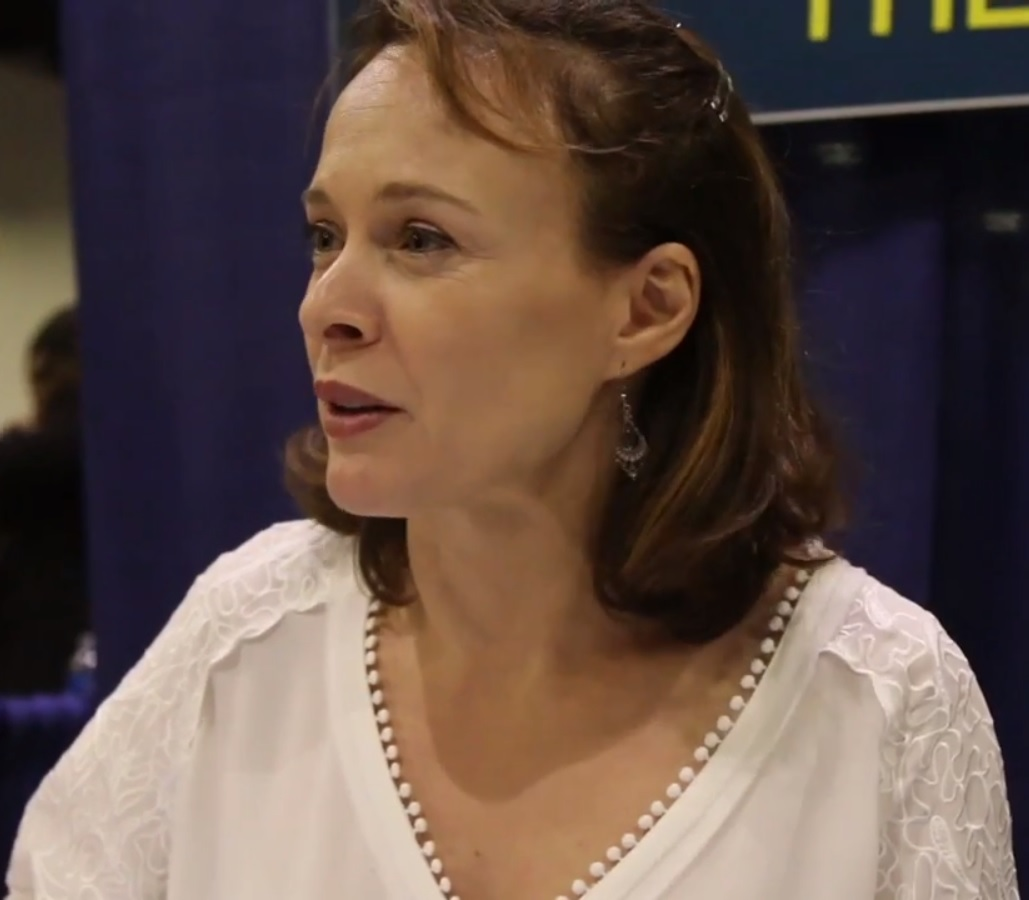
- Stronach at Rhode Island Comic Con
- Born: July 31, 1972 (age 54); Imperial State of Iran
- Occupations: Actor; dancer; filmmaker; professor
- Years active: 1983–present
- Notable work: The Childlike Empress in The NeverEnding Story
- Spouse: Greg Steinbruner
- Children: 1 daughter
- Father: David Stronach

Tamara "Tami" Stronach (born July 31, 1972) is an Iranian-born Israeli-American actor, dancer, filmmaker, and professor. She is best known for her role as the Childlike Empress in the 1984 fantasy film The NeverEnding Story.

A childhood performance as the Childlike Empress in the 1984 film The NeverEnding Story led to a record deal and music video in Germany. After receiving inappropriate attention as a young star, Stronach pivoted to dancing. As an adult, she has branched into teaching, producing dance performances, filmmaking, and supporting child performers.

== Personal life ==
Her father David Stronach was a Scottish Christian (1931–2020). After winning the lottery, he moved to Tehran, Iran, to pursue archaeology. There, he met Ruth Vaadia, an Israeli Jew (1937–2017). They married after a 48-hour romance.

Tami Stronach was born to David and Ruth on July 31, 1972, in the Imperial State of Iran. Tami Stronach, her sister Keren, and their parents fled the Iranian Revolution to Tel Aviv, where they briefly lived with Ruth's parents. They moved again to the United Kingdom, and then finally to Berkeley, California in 1981 to allow David to teach at the University of California, Berkeley.

By late 2014, Stronach and her daughter Maya (born 2010 or 2011) lived in Brooklyn; Stronach was married to Greg Steinbruner as of mid-2020. She speaks English, Hebrew, and Persian.

== Career ==
In addition to her artistic projects, Stronach also followed in her father's footsteps, becoming a professor in New York City.

=== Acting ===
As a child, Stronach studied musical theatre in Berkeley. While portraying Piglet in a San Francisco stage adaptation of Winnie-the-Pooh, she was approached by the casting director for The NeverEnding Story and asked to audition for the role of the Childlike Empress. After three auditions, Stronach beat Heather O'Rourke to star in the 1984 film. What Vice described as "the Empress' quasi-British accent [...] of indeterminate origin", was actually Stronach's natural accent, a result of having lived in Iran, Israel, the UK, and the US.

Ruth Stronach lived with her daughter in Bavaria for the three-month film shoot, and afterwards declined a sequel contract for her daughter, worried about lacking the wherewithal to "help her daughter navigate the turbulent waters of childhood stardom in the film industry". After The NeverEnding Story became a success, the Stronachs claimed to have become besieged with unwanted attention: their home and telephone were stalked, adults proposed to the eleven-year-old with engagement rings, and she received "offers from Hollywood to play roles featuring scenes (with nudity) completely inappropriate for someone her age".

Stronach returned to acting in 2002 with a physical theatre company, and by 2006 had performed in Chambre at La MaMa Experimental Theatre Club and was continuing to study acting with Laura Esterman.

=== Singing ===
During the junket for The NeverEnding Story, Stronach appeared on a German talk show and was asked how much German language she had learned; after explaining she only knew the lyrics to "99 Luftballons", she agreed to sing live on TV. The next day, a music producer offered a record deal. With only three days left in the country, the Stronachs agreed to the contract, songs were written, Stronach recorded them and starred in a music video, and she eagerly performed one of the songs—"Fairy Queen"—on two German TV shows, all before returning to the US. She later said of the whirlwind experience: "It was insane, [...] And then literally that was it. We didn't change the ticket."

=== Dancing ===
Switching her focus from acting to professional dancing after The NeverEnding Story, Stronach devoted herself to that study for ten years (through her twenties) in New York City. In 1996, Stronach began dancing with Neta Pulvermacher and Dancers, though she has also exhibited her own productions at Dixon Place, Washington Square Park, and the Galapagos Art Space.

=== Production ===
By the 2010s, Stronach had co-founded a theatre company called Shoehorn Theater; in 2012, they began creating a new play, Light: A Dark Comedy ("a group generative effort where everyone is involved in every step of the creation").

Steinbruner and Stronach created The Paper Canoe Company, an entertainment business that focused on "children's theatre, film, and education". After the TV series Stranger Things used "The NeverEnding Story" and renewed interest in Stronach and the 1984 film, the couple began making their own 1980s-styled fantasy film. Man and Witch: The Dance of a Thousand Steps stars Shohreh Aghdashloo, Sean Astin, Michael Emerson, Christopher Lloyd, Rhea Perlman, Stronach herself (as the Witch), and her daughter, Maya. In February 2023, the film was in post-production. It was released on July 28, 2024.

=== Credits ===
Year	Medium	Title	Role	Citation(s)
1983	Theatre	Winnie-the-Pooh	Piglet	
1984	Film	The NeverEnding Story	Childlike Empress	
2002	Theatre	Signals of Distress	Dog	
2024	Film	Man and Witch: The Dance of a Thousand Steps	The Witch & producer	
