= Man and Witch: The Dance of a Thousand Steps =

- U.S theatrical release poster
- Directed by: Michael Hines
- Written by: Greg Steinbruner
- Produced by: Greg Steinbruner; Tami Stronach; Angela Murray
- Starring: Tami Stronach; Greg Steinbruner; Sean Astin; Bill Bailey; Eddie Izzard; Jennifer Saunders; Michael Emerson; Shohreh Aghdashloo; Christopher Lloyd
- Cinematography: Simon Vickery
- Edited by: Victoria Boydell
- Music by: Geoff Zanelli
- Production company: Paper Canoe Studio
- Distributed by: Fathom Events
- Release date: 28 July 2024 (United States)
- Running time: 94 minutes
- Country: United Kingdom
- Language: English

Man and Witch: The Dance of a Thousand Steps is a 2024 British fantasy adventure comedy film directed by Michael Hines, written by Greg Steinbruner, and starring Tami Stronach, Steinbruner, Sean Astin, Bill Bailey, Eddie Izzard, Jennifer Saunders, Michael Emerson, Shohreh Aghdashloo and Christopher Lloyd. It was released in the United States on 28 July 2024.

== Cast ==
- Tami Stronach as Witch
- Sean Astin as Dog
- Christopher Lloyd as Alchemist
- Michael Emerson as Evil Wizard
- Greg Steinbruner as Goatherd
- Maya Stronach as Cupid
- Jennifer Saunders as Goose
- Eddie Izzard as Sheep
- Bill Bailey as Donkey
- Shohreh Aghdashloo as The Wisewoman
- Pauline McLynn as The Mother
- Daniel Portman as Captain of the Guard
- Reginald D. Hunter as The Neighbor
- Stuart Bowman as King
- Martha West as Princess
- Giovanni Pernice as Dance Master

== Production ==
In July 2020, it was announced that Stronach, Astin, Perlman, Lloyd and Emerson were cast in the film, then titled Man & Witch, with Rob Margolies as director.

In July 2021, it was announced that many others were cast in the film and that filming wrapped after a six week shoot in Los Angeles and Scotland.

In February 2024, it was announced that Fathom Events acquired American distribution rights to the film.
