= Mahmoud Hessabi =

Iranian nuclear physicist (1903–1992)

Seyyed Mahmoud Hessabi
- محمود حسابی

Minister of Culture and Higher Education
- In office 6 May 1951 – 16 July 1952
- Prime Minister: Mohammad Mosaddegh
- Preceded by: Karim Sanjabi
- Succeeded by: Mehdi Azar

Senator from Tehran
- In office 22 January 1950 – 9 May 1961
- Appointed by: Mohammad Reza Pahlavi

Personal details
- Born: 23 February 1903 Tehran, Sublime State of Iran
- Died: 3 September 1992 (aged 89) Geneva, Switzerland
- Resting place: Tafresh, Iran
- Education: American University of Beirut, Sorbonne, École Superieure d'Electricité
- Occupation: scientist

Mahmoud Khan Mirza Hessabi (or Hessaby, Persian: محمودخان میرزا حسابی; 23 February 1903 – 3 September 1992) was an Iranian nuclear physicist and senator. He was the minister of education in the cabinet of Prime Minister Mohammad Mosaddegh from 1951 to 1952.

== Life ==
Hessabi was born in Tehran to the family of Abbas and Goharshad Hessabi. His family's hometown is Tafresh, Markazi province, Iran. His family moved to Beirut in 1907 when his father was appointed consul at the Iranian embassy. There Hessabi attended primary school. He was still in secondary school when World War I started prompting the closure of his school, so Hessabi continued his education at home and in 1922, he earned a degree in road engineering from the American University of Beirut. After briefly working for the Ministry of Roads, Beirut, Hessabi travelled to Paris for further education, where he was awarded a degree in electrical engineering at the École Superieure d'Electricité and later a doctorate degree in 1927. In Paris, he worked with Aime Cotton.

In Tehran, Hessabi was affiliated with the University of Tehran and organized the science and engineering faculties of the university. He was the teacher of Alenush Terian while she studied at the university. In June 1951, Hessabi was appointed to a three-man provincial board of the Iranian oil company, the designated successor of the Anglo-Iranian Oil Company. Dr. Hessabi led the nationalisation of the company and became its first CEO. In December 1951, he replaced Karim Sanjaby as minister of education. Between 1961 and 1969, Hessabi was Iran's representative on the Scientific and Technical Subcommittee of the United Nations Committee on the Peaceful Uses of Outer Space.

During the congress honoring "60 Years of Physics in Iran," his services were celebrated, and he was dubbed "the father of modern physics in Iran."

== Museum ==
In 1992, his house changed to a museum to for recognition of his life. The Mahmoud Hessabi Museum is located in the Tajrish neighbourhood in Tehran.

The Hessabi family is part of Iran's Muslim elite. One of the capital's avenues is named after them, leading to a square with a statue of Dr. Hessabi. Mahmoud Hessabi had a son and a daughter. His son, an engineering graduate, is head of the Dr. Hessabi Institute (2015). Today, the majority of the family lives outside Iran, particularly following the 1979 Iranian Revolution.

== Selected works ==
- Hessaby M. (1947). "Continuous Particles". Proceedings of the National Academy of Sciences of the United States of America. 33 (6): 189–194. Bibcode:1947PNAS...33..189H. doi:10.1073/pnas.33.6.189. PMC 1079021. PMID 16588741.
- Hessaby M. (May 1948). "Theoretical Evidence for the Existence of a Light-Charged Particle of Mass Greater than That of the Electron". Phys. Rev. 73 (9=): 1128. Bibcode:1948PhRv...73.1128H. doi:10.1103/PhysRev.73.1128.

== See also ==
- Mahmoud Hessabi museum
- Physics Society of Iran
- List of contemporary Iranian scientists, scholars, and engineers
- List of Iranian senators
- Markazi province
