= Noushindokht Nafisi =

Iranian female archaeologist

Nooshindokht Naficy
- نوشین‌دخت نفیسی
- Born: 16 May 1930; Tehran, Iran
- Died: 5 May 2012 (aged 81); Tehran, Iran
- Education: University of Tehran; University of Calcutta
- Occupations: Museologist, archaeologist, researcher, university lecturer
- Father: Saeed Nafisi

Noushindokht Nafisi (Persian: نوشین‌دخت نفیسی; 16 May 1930 – 5 May 2012), also known as Nouchine Naficy, was an Iranian museologist, archaeologist, researcher and university lecturer. She worked for fifteen years at the National Museum of Iran and contributed to the establishment of the Abgineh Museum of Tehran.

== Early life and education ==
Nafisi was born on 16 May 1930 in Tehran. She was the eldest child of Saeed Nafisi, an Iranian literary scholar, historian and writer, and a granddaughter of Ali-Akbar Nafisi, known as Nazem al-Atebba, a physician and lexicographer of the Qajar period. She received her primary and secondary education at Tehran's Razi schools.

She graduated in archaeology from the University of Tehran in 1952; and conitued to study in India, where she studied history and civilisation at the University of Calcutta. She also studied French language and civilisation in Paris , as well as a course in public relations in Britain.

== Museum career ==
Following her return to Iran, Nafisi joined the Ministry of Culture and Arts and worked at the Museum of Ancient Iran, where she remained there with the museum for approximately fifteen years.

The catalogue of the travelling exhibition 7000 Years of Iranian Art, organised by the Smithsonian Institution in 1964–1965, lists her under the name "Nouchine Naficy" as assistant curator of the Islamic section of the Archaeological Museum in Tehran.

Nafisi later served as head of the museum's library and as deputy director of Iran's General Directorate of Museums.

One of the principal museum projects associated with Nafisi was the establishment of the Glassware and Ceramic Museum of Iran, known as the Abgineh Museum of Tehran which was opened in 1980.

== Teaching and Publications ==
Alongside her museum work, Nafisi taught archaeology, art history, museology and the history of writing at several Iranian higher education institutions such as the University of Tehran, Farabi University, and the University of Art, as well as other universities in Iran

Nafisi published several book and articles about museum curatorship, history and archaeology comissioned by Iranian Cultural Heritage Organisation, SAMT (the Organisation for Researching and Publishing University Textbooks in the Humanities) as well as other publications.

She also collaborated with her father, Saeed Nafisi, on the Persian translation of Walter J. Fischel's work Ibn Khaldun and Tamerlane, published in 1960.

== Death ==
Nafisi died in Tehran on 5 May 2012, aged 81, following a stroke.

On 20 June 2012, the Iranian Academy of Arts held a memorial ceremony marking the fortieth day after her death. The event was attended by scholars, former students, colleagues and members of the Nafisi family.
