= Museum of Ancient Iran =

Museum in Tehran, Iran

- موزهٔ ملی ایران; Muze-ye Melli-ye Irān
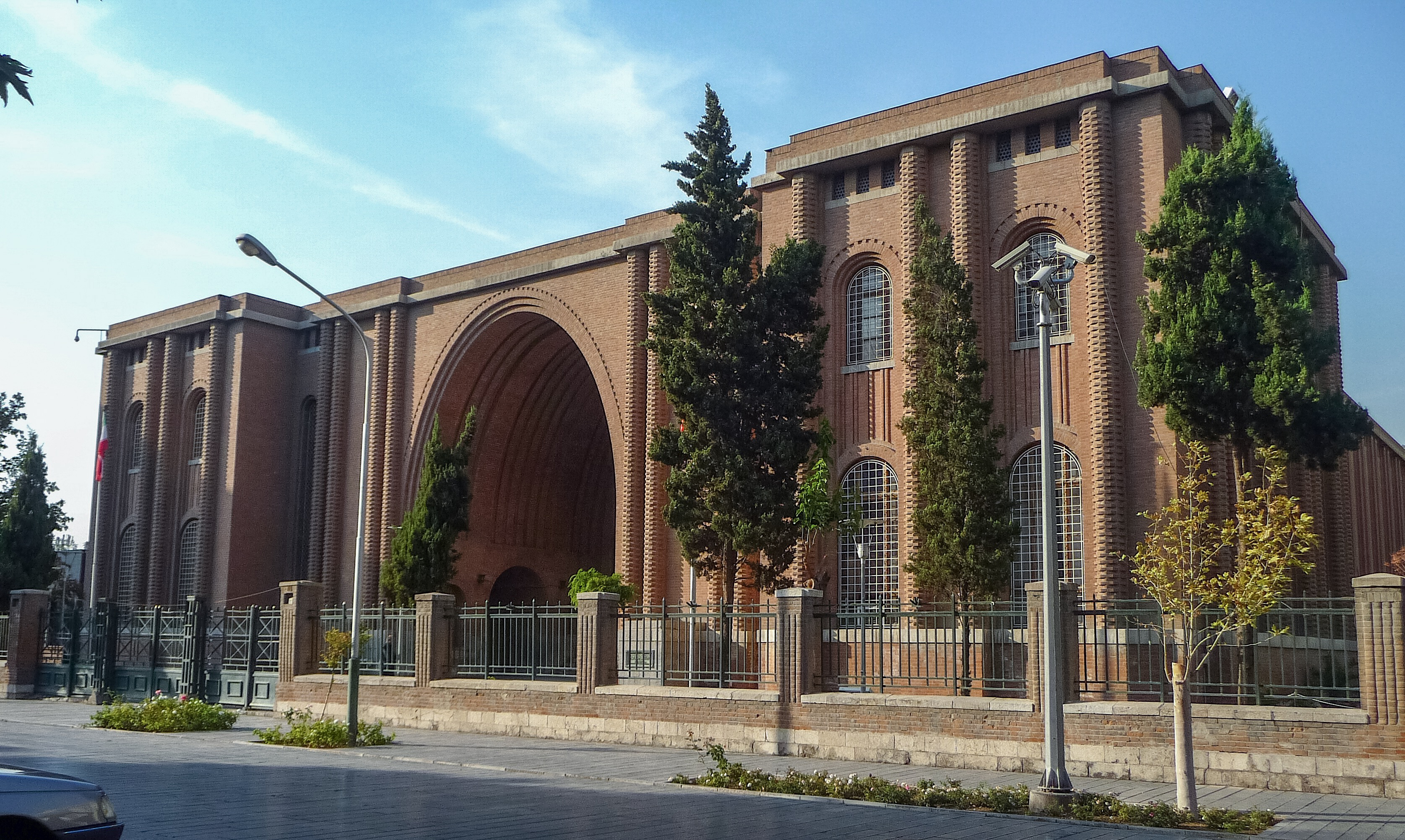
- Museum of Ancient Iran
- Established: 1937; 86 years
- Location: Tehran, Iran
- Type: Archaeology museum
- Director: Jebrael Nokandeh
- Architect: André Godard
- Owner: ICHTO
- Website: irannationalmuseum.ir

The Museum of Ancient Iran is located at the western part of Mashhq Square in Tehran, Iran. It was designed by André Godard by the order of Ali-Asghar Hekmat, then Minister of Education of Pahlavi Iran. Two Iranian master builders, Ostad Morad Tabrizi and Abbas Ali Memar, constructed the building. Construction of the museum was started in 1934 and was completed in 1937. It was subsequently opened for the public.

The land allocated to this museum is 5,500 square meters, of which 2,744 square meters is used for the foundation of the museum. The Museum, along with the adjacent Museum of the Islamic Era, make up the National Museum of Iran.

== The building ==
The museum encompasses an area of about 11,000 square meters, with its main building built in three floors. Its architects, André Godard, along with Maxime Siroux, were French architects whose designs were inspired from the Palace of Kasra in the ancient city of Ctesiphon of the Sasanian era.

The construction of the museum was started in 1934 on the order of Minister of Education Ali-Asghar Hekmat. Iran's then ruler Reza Shah agreed to Hekmat's proposal for establishing a museum and designated a section of a former military compound as its location. The aforementioned Godard designed the structure, but he assigned two Iranian master builders, Ostad Morad Tabrizi and Abbas Ali Memar, to construct it. The building was officially opened in 1937. Primarily, the first floor of the museum was dedicated to pre-Islamic history of Iran and the second floor to the post-Islamic era.

When designing the museum, Godard employed the egg-shaped Sasanian vaulted iwan adorned with intricate brickwork for the entrance. Specifically, the design of the entrance arch drew inspiration from the renowned Ctesiphon arch, albeit on a smaller scale. These egg-shaped arches, with their symbolic name, were utilized to span large areas in various Iranian buildings spanning different historical periods. Godard, in his essay "Neyriz mosque," recounted encountering facades reminiscent of Ctesiphon in recently constructed houses near Yazd and Semnan, highlighting the prevalence of such architectural forms and techniques in contemporary Iran.

Incorporating historical elements into contemporary construction methods, Godard exclusively utilized locally sourced bricks. Adorning the upper section of the museum's entrance arch with marble, a poem celebrating the architectural prowess and Reza Shah adorned the facade. Crafted in the Tholth style by Amir AlKottab Kurdestani, a renowned calligrapher of the era, the poem was the creation of Mohammad-Taqi Bahar (also known as Malek osh-Sho'arā Bahār) a distinguished literary figure. Following the 1979 Islamic revolution, this inscription was replaced with verses from the Quran. Godard emphasized the reliance on domestic materials, stating that only display cases and certain metal components were sourced from abroad.

While Godard undertook the architectural design, Siroux was tasked with creating the garden layouts for both the museum and the Iran National Library. Drawing inspiration from the precise geometry of Iranian gardens, central pools, and fountains, along with the placement of cypress trees along the garden perimeters, characterized the design. Historian Abbas Amanat suggests that contemporary Iranian public structures of that period often incorporated subtle nods to Persian architectural heritage. For instance, Amanat notes that both the Ancient Iran Museum and the Iran National Library were conceived with tasteful elements inspired by Sasanian architecture. However, Talinn Grigor critiques Godard's approach, labeling the Ancient Iran Museum as a "re-creation," while acknowledging its influence on subsequent architects, as evidenced by projects like Hossein Amanat's 1971 Shahyad Aryamehr Tower, which echoes the outline of the Ctesiphon vault in western Tehran. Despite such criticisms, Grigor acknowledges Godard's role in advocating for the utilization of historical motifs in shaping modern Iranian architecture.

The museum building was originally intended to be an anthropology museum. But after the Islamic Revolution, with the establishment of the Cultural Heritage Organization and the concentration of ancient objects in the Museum of Ancient Iran, it was suggested that the museum be renamed to the National Museum of Iran and another museum named the Museum of Islamic Art be added to it. Eventually, in 1996, with the official opening of the Islamic Museum, the whole complex of the Museum of Ancient Iran and the Museum of the Islamic Era was officially named as the National Museum of Iran. The works of the Islamic era were officially separated from the Museum of Ancient Iran and moved to the adjacent building, which had been built in 1958.

== Collection ==
The oldest part of the museum, built by hand is made of quartz stones found in the Kashafrud Basin east of the city of Mashhad. From the Middle Paleolithic period, which coincides with the emergence of Neanderthals in Iran, also remains of interesting tools made of pyrite or remains of animal fossil fountains, found in caves in Zagros Mountains and central Iranian Plateau like the caves of Bisotun and Khorramabad which are put on display in the museum.

In the New Paleolithic period, which corresponds with the expansion of modern human intelligence in Iran, the construction of a blade of tools became common place. The oldest human remains discovered in Iran are seen in this section, which is known for its tooth. This tooth is the oldest remains of human fossils in Iran, which was discovered in a cave near Kermanshah called Wezmeh. This small Asian tooth, which is related to a nine-year-old child, dates back 20–25 thousand years ago and was discovered by gamma-ray spectroscopy.

In the new Paleolithic period, making bone tools and using personalized decorations such as pillow pendants, animal teeth, and flowers were also common in Iran. One of the most important places of this period is the cave named Yafteh in Lorestan province which displays many of these objects in the museum hall. Some examples of hybrid instruments, the application of stratification, and the preservation of foodstuffs from the Ali Tappeh cave in Mazandaran and Shalom cave in Ilam which are associated to the Metamorphosed Rock period can also be seen in the museum.

From the Neolithic and Romanesque art, works such as the oldest Iranian clay from the Gange Darre Hill, the oldest human and animal mud samples from the Sarab Hill, and some stone tools are shown in the hall, including Shoush (Khuzestan), Ismail-Abad and Cheshmeh Ali (Tehran), Taleyakon (Fars) from the most important sites in the 5th and 4th millennium BC. Copper and stones in Iran, with samples of their pottery are painted and seen in the hall.

Vessels of Jiroft and Shahdad with diverse designs such as the battle of man with mythological beasts and the pattern of geometric, animal and plant elements are typical examples of these vessels displayed in showcases. Another important work of this period in the museum is the flower of Shahdad, which shows a naked man with his hands on the chest, probably in prayer mode. Containers, war devices, decorative objects, human and animal buildings, including the metal objects of the late Bronze Age and the beginning of the Iron Age, are shown in the hall. A number of objects displayed in the prehistoric art section of the hall belong to the Ilam civilization.

Of all the periods in Ilam, many works of art have survived. Chogha Zanbil Temple is one of the most important architectural remnants of this period, with works such as a cow's statue with inscriptions, glass tubes, bricks and clones on it, are featured in the hall.

The works in the museum hall attributable to the Medes are from the ancient places of Nowshajan, Hasanlu, Godin, and Babajan. During this era, the construction of iron objects expanded, including the objects of Hasanlu, which is one of the most prominent examples in the hall. Glazed pottery was also created, a notable example of which is the glaze of Zivia, showing two goats on the two sides of a Lotus flower.

== Gallery ==
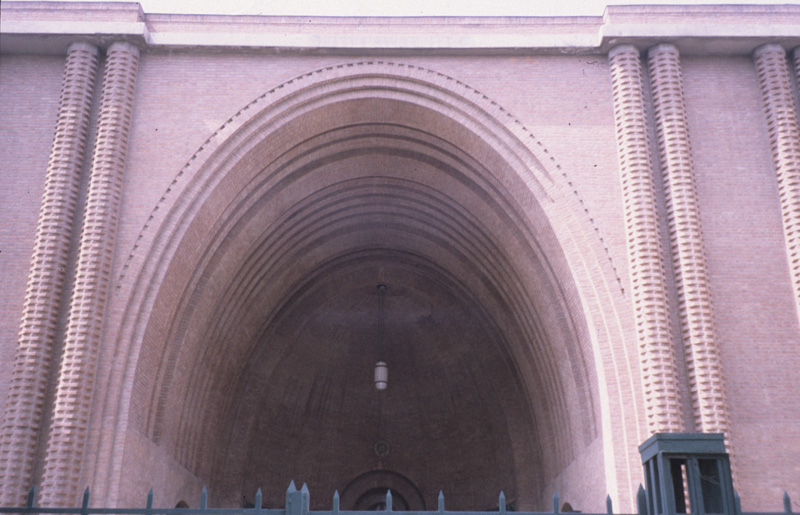
Museum entrance

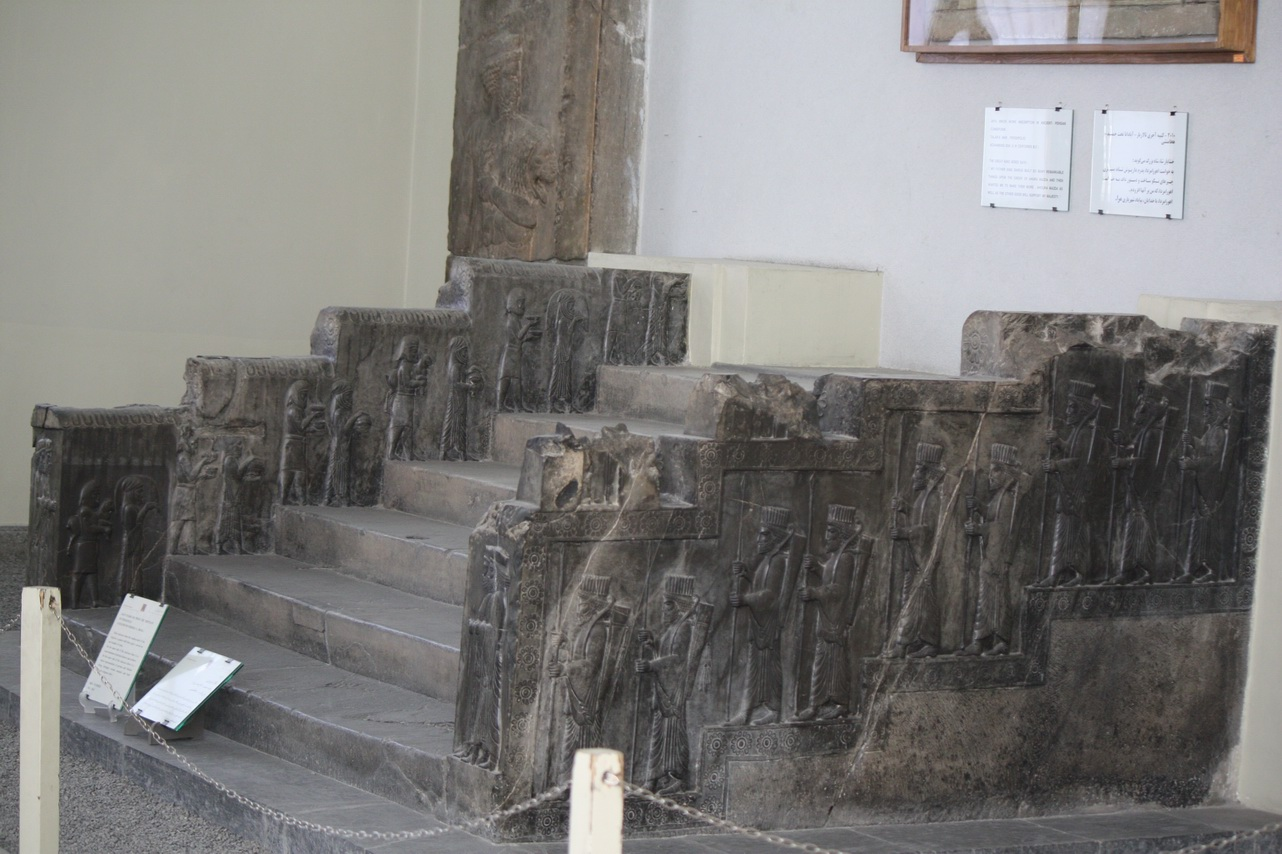
Stairs from Persepolis

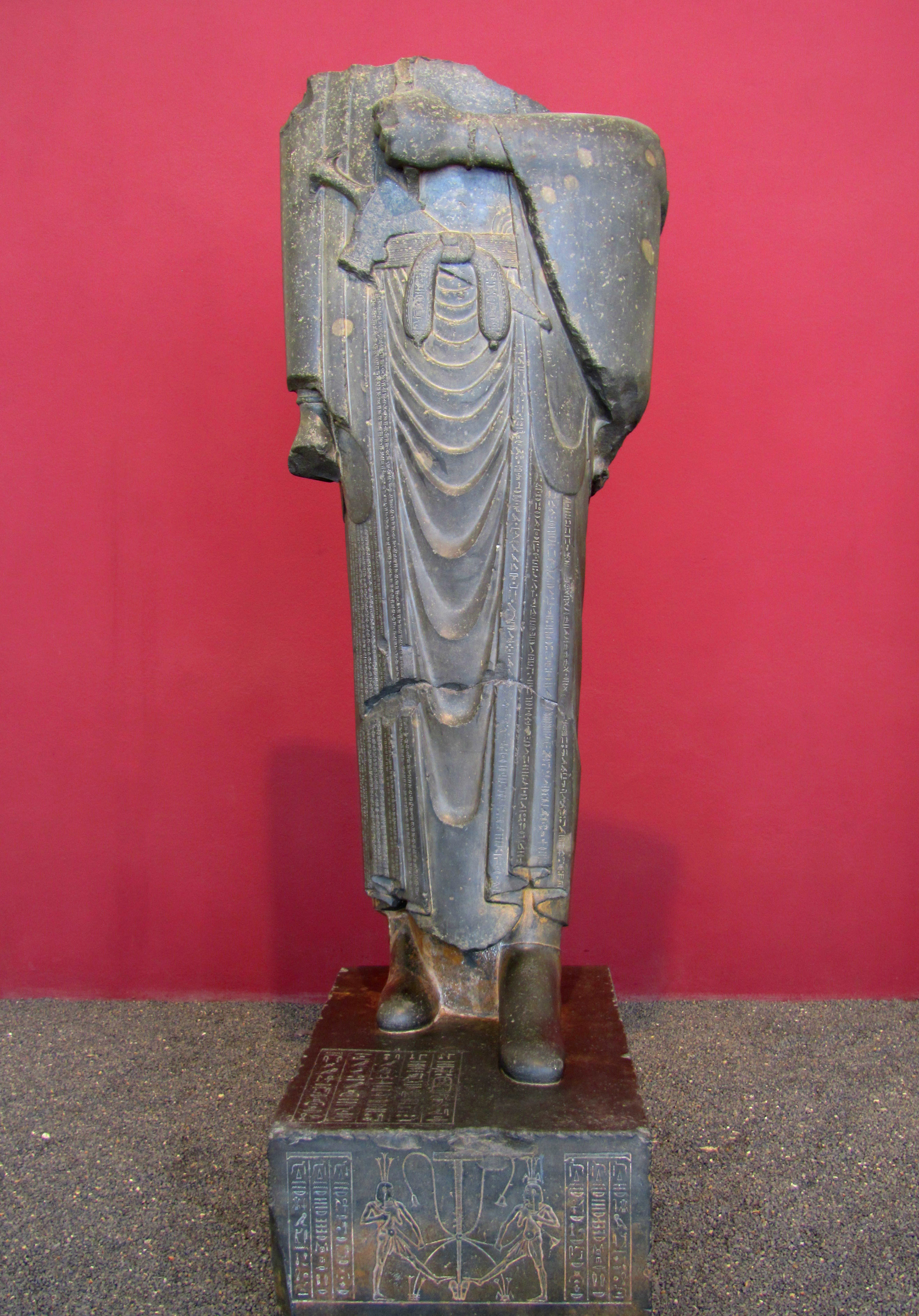
Egyptian statue of Darius the Great

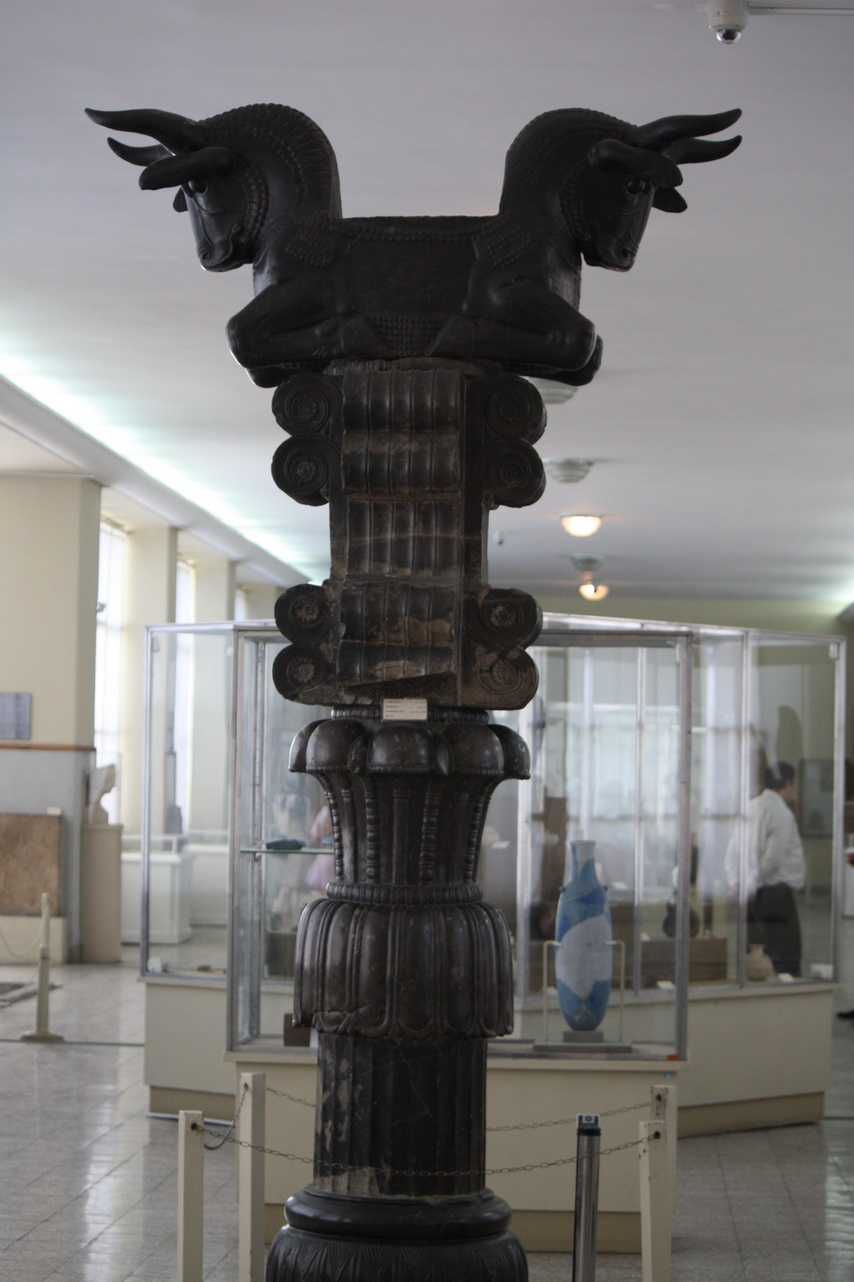
Persepolis

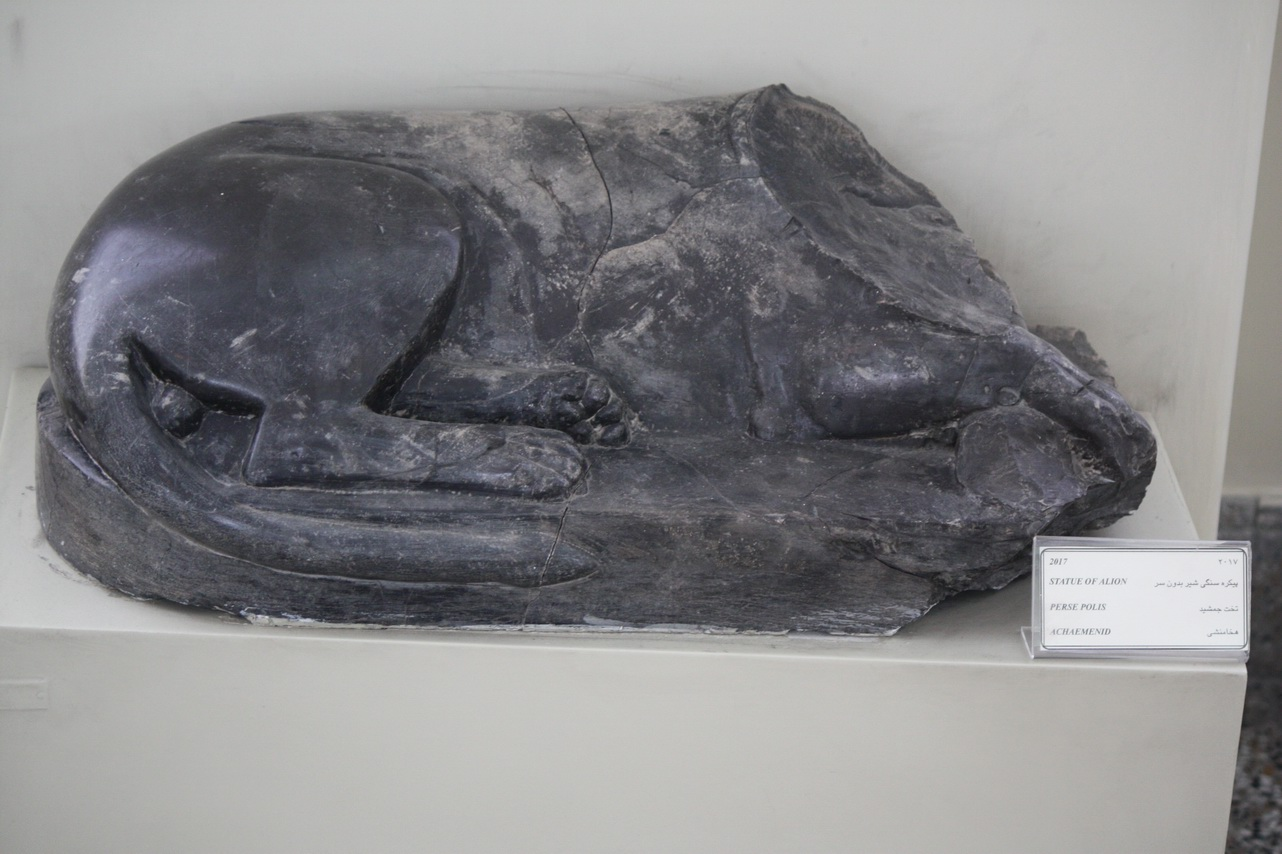
Achaemenid era Lion statue without its head

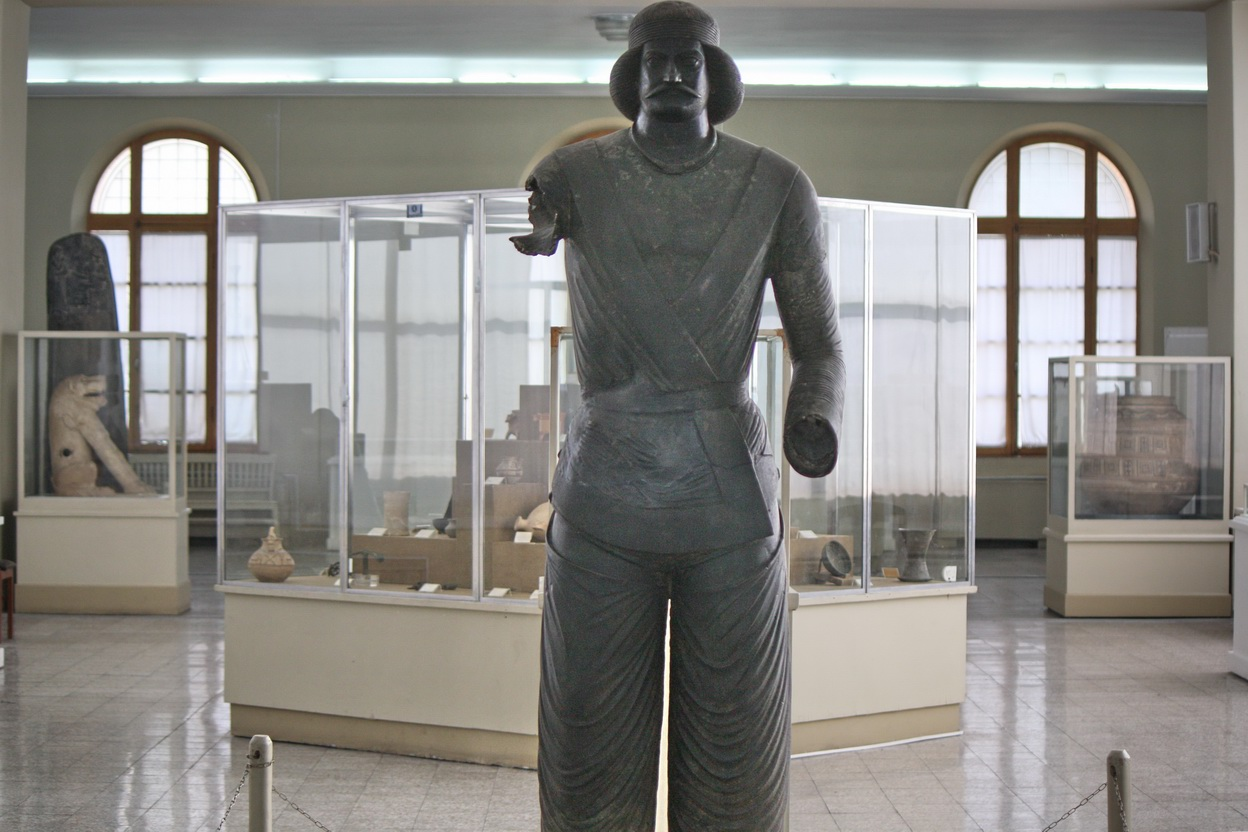
Shami statue

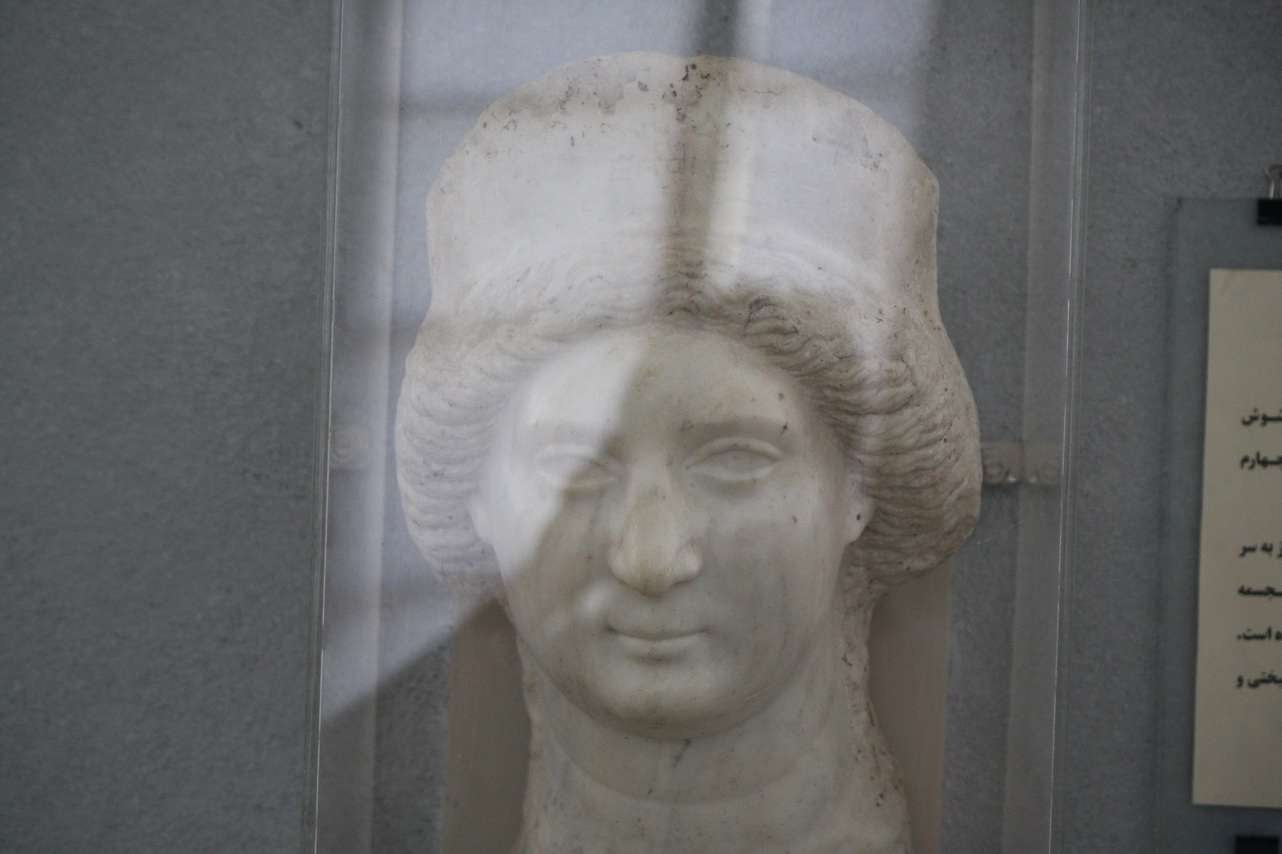
A Parthian Princess

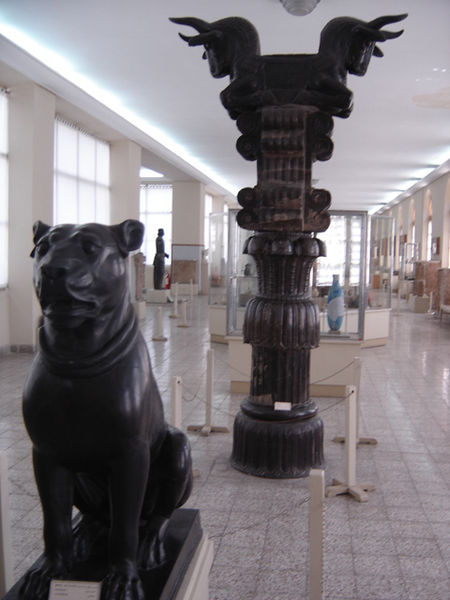
Inside the museum
