= 1880 in Iran =

- Decades
- See also: Other events of 1880; Years in Iran

The following lists events that happened during 1880 in Qajar era.

== Incumbents ==
- Monarch: Naser al-Din Shah Qajar

== Births ==
- October 3 – Amineh Pakravan, Iranian historian.
- October 12 – Mirza Kuchik Khan, Iranian revolutionary.
- December 20 – Haydar Khan Amo-oghli, Iranian revolutionary.
- ? – Ali Akbar Bahman, Iranian diplomat and politician.
- ? – Gregory Yeghikian, Armenian playwright.
- ? – Hajj Mohammad Nakhjavani, Iranian businessman, scholar, and collector of manuscripts.
- ? – Malek Mansur Mirza Shoa as-Saltaneh, Iranian politician.
- ? – Mohammad Khiabani, Iranian politician.
- ? – Vahid Dasgardi, Iranian poet, literary and journalist.

== Deaths ==
- ? – Mohammad Hasan Afshar, Qajar Persian court painter.
