= 1879 in Iran =

- Decades
- See also: Other events of 1879; Years in Iran

The following lists events that happened during 1879 in Qajar era.

== Incumbents ==
- Monarch: Naser al-Din Shah Qajar

== Births ==
- December 3 – Sheyda Gerashi, Iranian poet.
- ? – Ali Monsieur, Iranian politician.
- ? – Ali-Akbar Dehkhoda, lexicographer, linguist and satirist.
- ? – Aziz al-Soltan, Iranian royal page.
- ? – Esmail Momtaz od-Dowleh, Iranian politician.
- ? – Hajj Mohammad Nakhjavani, Iranian businessman, scholar, and collector of manuscripts.
- ? – Hossein Ardabili, Iranian politician.
- ? – Mohammad Ali Modarres Khiabani, Iranian author, mojtahed and scholar.
- ? – Muhammad Hossein Gharavi, Iraqi-Iranian faqih and poet.
