= Ministry of Cultural Heritage, Tourism and Handicrafts =

Government ministry of Iran

Ministry of Cultural Heritage, Tourism and Handicrafts of Iran
- وزارت میراث فرهنگی، گردشگری و صنایع دستی ایران; Vezârat-e Mirâs-e Farhangi, Gardeshgari va Sanâye'-e Dasti-ye Irân
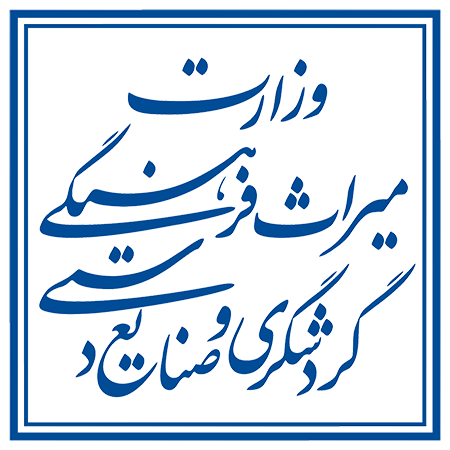
- Original logo from 2019

- Flag of the Ministry of Cultural Heritage, Tourism and Handicrafts of Iran

Agency overview
- Formed: 1985
- Preceding agencies: Touring and Tourism Organization (1991 to 2003); Deputy of Touring and Pilgrimage in Ministry of Islamic Guidance (1979 to 1991); Ministry of Intelligence and Tourism (1974 to 1979); Office of Tourism (1954 to 1963); Touring Council (1941 to 1954); Office of Tourists and publicity (1935 to 1941)
- Jurisdiction: Government of the Islamic Republic of Iran
- Headquarters: Tehran, Iran
- Employees: 7,200 (2013)
- Annual budget: 375 billion toman (2014)
- Agency executive: Reza Salehi Amiri
- Website: www.mcth.ir

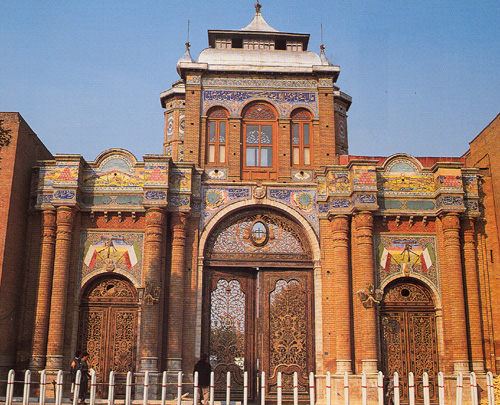
The gates of Bagh Melli, where some offices of ICHTO are located. The gates were constructed during the Qajar era.

The Ministry of Cultural Heritage, Tourism and Handicrafts of Iran (Persian: وزارت میراث فرهنگی، گردشگری و صنایع دستی ایران, romanized: Vezârat-e Mirâs-e Farhangi, Gardeshgari va Sanâye'-e Dasti-ye Irân) is an educational and research institution overseeing numerous associated museum complexes throughout Iran. It is administered and funded by the Government of Iran.

It was first established in 1985 through legislation from the Majlis merging 11 research and cultural organizations. In 2019, the Iranian Cultural Heritage, Handicrafts and Tourism Organization (ICHHTO) was converted into the Ministry. The current Minister has been Reza Salehi Amiri since 21 August 2024.

== Locations ==
Select list of notable museums and palaces overseen by ICHTO, listed in alphabetical order.

- Abgineh Museum of Tehran (Glassware and Ceramics Museum of Iran)
- Arg-e Bam
- Carpet Museum of Iran
- Golestan Palace
- Iranian National Museum of Medical Sciences History
- Malek National Museum of Iran
- Naqsh-e Jahan Square
- National Car Museum of Iran
- National Museum of Iran
- Niavaran Palace Complex
- Pars Museum of Shiraz
- Pearl Palace (Morvarid Palace)
- Reza Abbasi Museum
- Sa'dabad Palace Complex

== Select ICHTO archeological projects ==
- Masooleh Historical Town
- Haft Teppe
- Ayapir
- Chogha Zanbil
- Soltaniyeh
- Behistun
- Takht-e Soleyman / Adur Gushnasp
- Arg-e Bam
- Persepolis and Pasargadae

ICHTO has branches in all provinces of Iran that administer and operate local projects, sites and museums.

== See also ==
- Tourism in Iran
- Iranian art
- Culture of Iran
- History of Iran
- Architecture of Iran
- Economy of Iran
- Society for the National Heritage of Iran
