= 1873 in Iran =

- Decades
- See also: Other events of 1873; Years in Iran

The following lists events that happened during 1873 in Qajar era.

== Incumbents ==
- Monarch: Naser al-Din Shah Qajar

== Births ==
- March 29 – Ali Mojuz, Iranian Azerbaijani poet.
- ? – Hossein Agha Malek, Iranian philanthropist.
- ? – Mohammad Hasan Mamaqani, leading mujtahid of Najaf in the 19th century.

== Deaths ==
- April 2 – Malek Jahan Khanom, Regent of Persia, Qajar queen mother and princess.
