= Malek National Museum and Library =

Museum and library in Tehran, Iran

Malek National Library and Museum
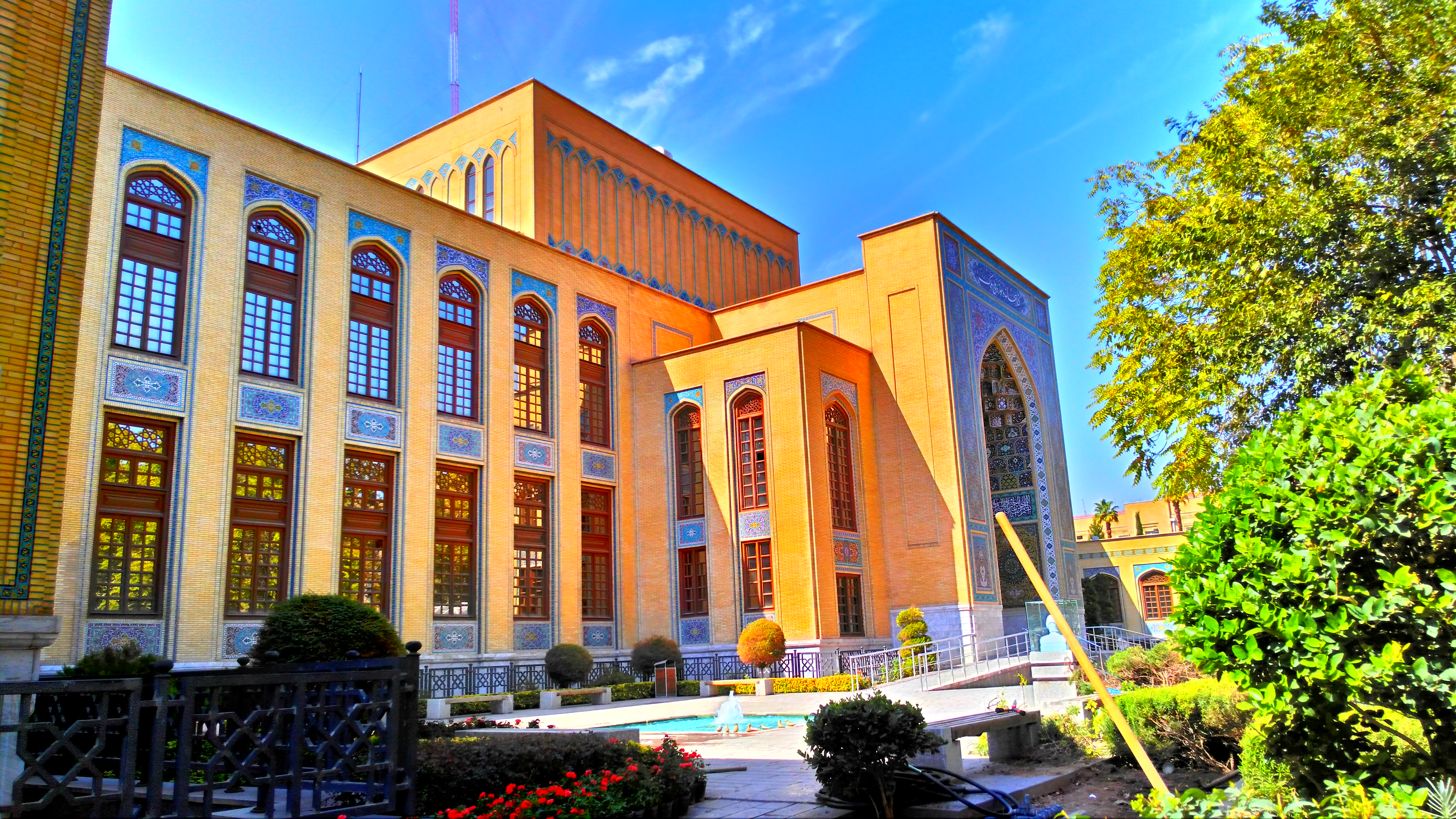
- 35°41′13″N 51°24′55″E
- Location: National Garden, Tehran, Iran
- Type: National library, Public library, National Museum
- Established: 1996
- Branch of: Astan Quds Razavi

Collection
- Size: 19,000 manuscripts 70,000 books
- Criteria for collection: Manuscripts, Historical Artworks

Other information
- Director: Mohammad Mojtaba Hosseini
- Website: malekmuseum.org

Malek National Museum and Library (Persian: کتابخانه و موزه ملی ملک) is a museum and national library in Tehran, Iran. The MNLMI is located in the National Garden area. MNLMI was built by Hossein Agha Malek. He built it in a traditional Persian architecture style.

== Haj Hossein Aqa Malek ==
Haj Hossein Agha Malek (1871–1972), the founder and donor of MNLM was born and died in Tehran. In 1908, Haj Hossein Aqa Malek founded a library in Mashhad, which consisted of manuscripts and printed books. MNLM is a non-profit institution aimed at expanding the knowledge among the people. He has also mentioned that his collection would be available to both Iranian and foreign addresses.

== Malek National Library and Museum ==
Besides the printed books and historical periodical documents, Malek National Library possesses manuscripts.

== The facilities and attractions of MNLM ==
In 1996, the Malek National Library and Museum was moved from Malek's house, located in the area of Tehran Grand Bazaar, to its present building in the precinct of the National Garden. This historical street is well known as the Religions' Street because of certain buildings located in it, including two churches, a fire temple, and a synagogue next to a mosque. Because of its special characteristics, this street is considered as one of the important centers of tourism in Tehran for its daily, domestic, and international visitors.

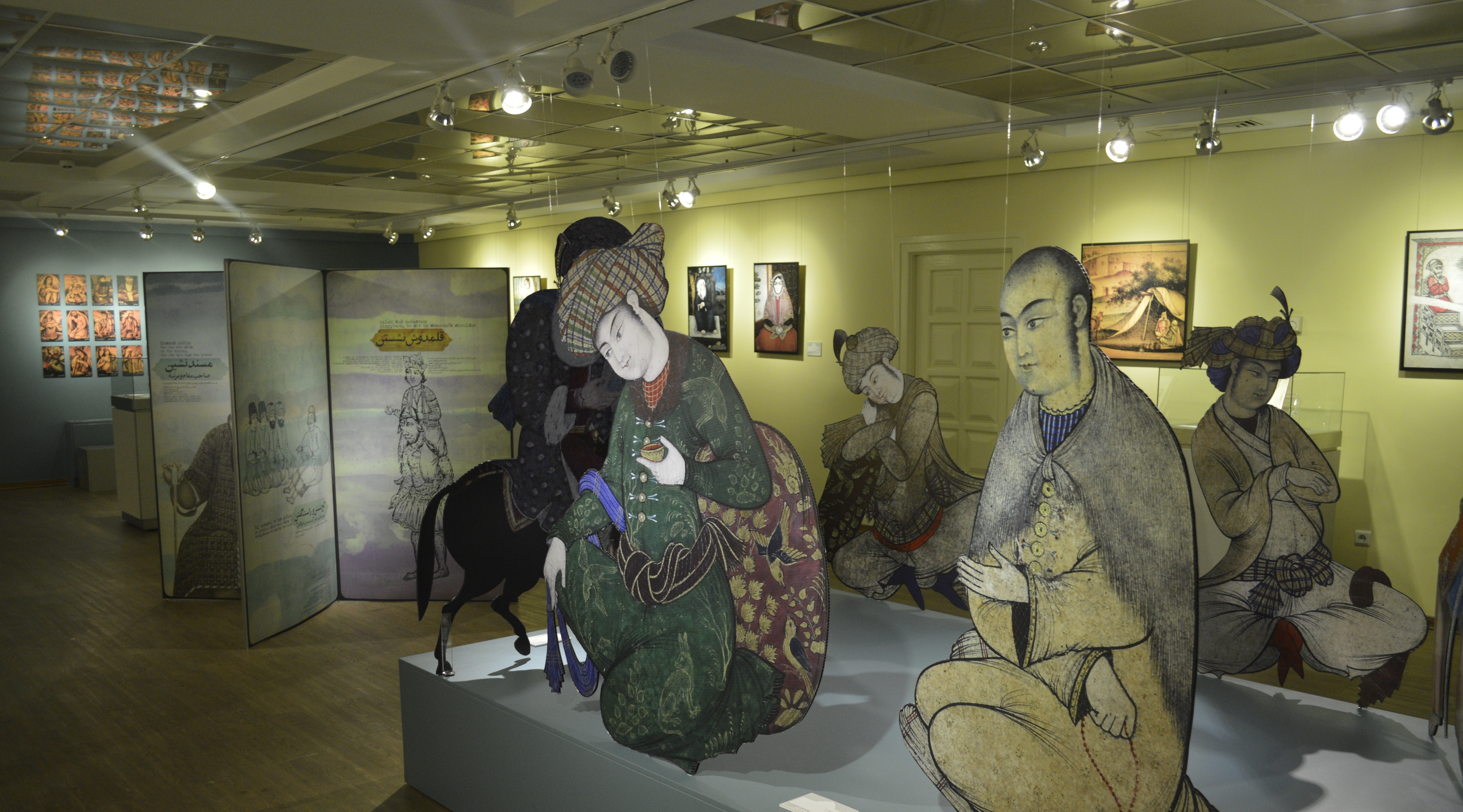

== See also ==
- Safir Office Machines Museum
- National Library and Archives of Iran
- Ministry of Cultural Heritage, Tourism and Handicrafts
- Qajar dynasty
- Hossein Agha Malek
- List of libraries in Iran
- List of museums in Iran
