= National Garden, Tehran =

Historic site in Tehran, Iran

The National Garden
- Meydān-e Mashq (Persian)
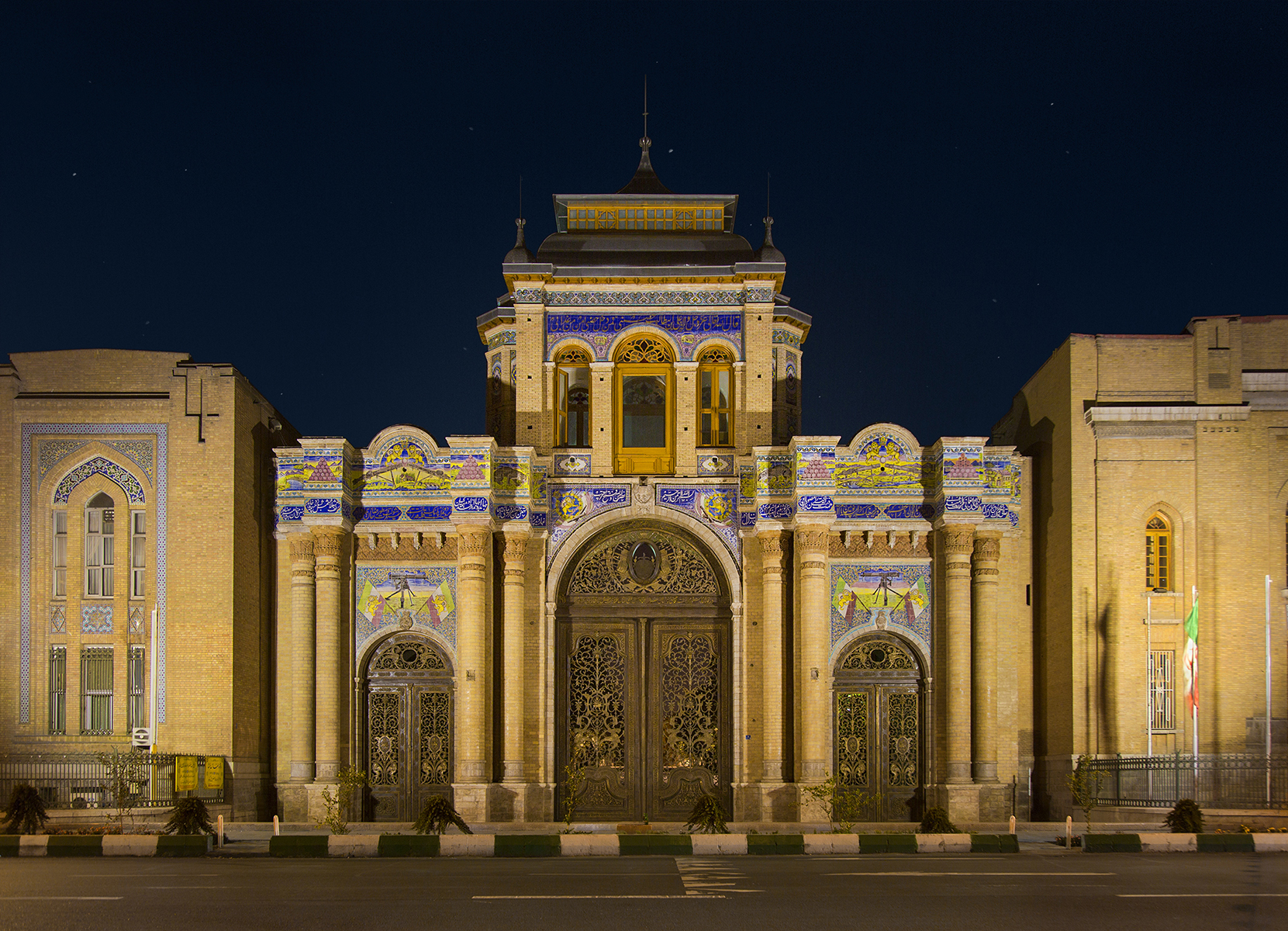
- Gate of the National Garden
- Interactive map of The National Garden
- 35°41′14″N 51°25′01″E
- Type: Governmental compound
- Location: Tehran, Iran

History
- Built: During Fath-Ali Shah Qajar's reign
- Original use: Military shooting range

Site notes
- Current use: Ministry of Foreign Affairs, Museum of Ancient Iran, Malek National Museum and Library, Post and Telegraph museum of Iran
- Owner: Government of Iran

The National Garden (Persian: باغ ملی, romanized: Bāq-e Melli) or Ministry of Foreign Affairs Gate is a historical and governmental compound in Tehran, Iran.

Formerly referred to as the Parade Square (میدان مشق, Meydān-e Mashq; میدان رژه, Meydān-e Rezhe), it used to be a military shooting range during the Qajar era. It was then turned into a public park for a short period, and eventually important governmental offices and museums were built around it.

Building number 9 of the Ministry of Foreign Affairs (formerly the "Police House"), the University of Art (formerly the "Cossack House"), Malek National Museum and Library, Post and Communication Museum, and the National Museum are situated in the compound.

== History ==
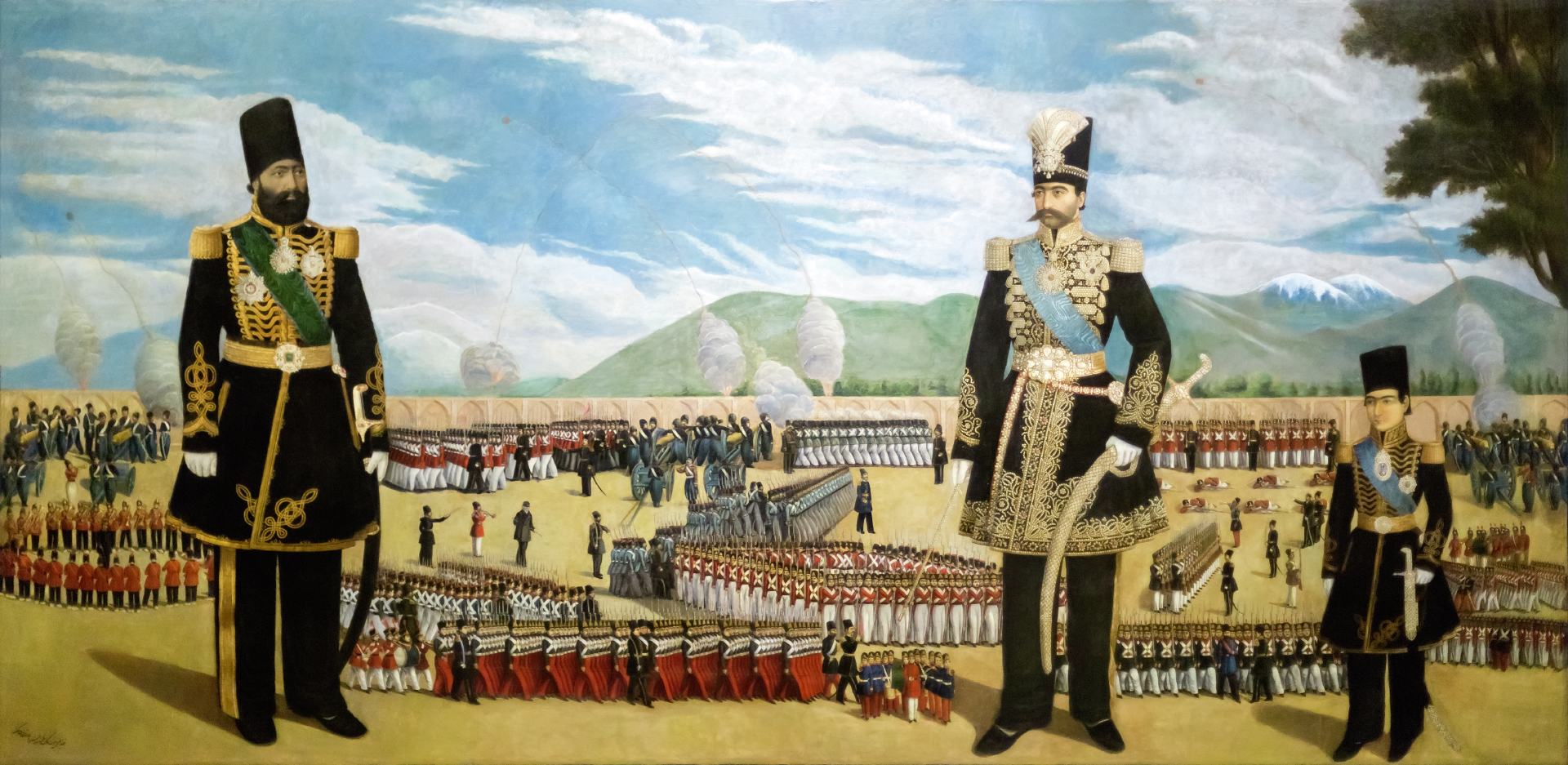
Naser al-Din Shah Qajar (centre) and Mirza Mohammad Khan Sepahsalar (left) at Mashq Square, by Mohammad Hasan Afshar, mid 19th century

The field was first constructed as a shooting practice range, during the Qajar era. It was used for the military garrison, and the Persian Cossack Brigade practiced military parade in it. During the reign of Naser al-Din Shah Qajar, the range was developed with a new building named the Cossack House, which was later somewhat transformed during the reign of Mozaffar ad-Din Shah Qajar.

During the Pahlavi era and during the rule of Reza Shah, the range was turned into a modern public park for a short period, and the famous gate of the compound was built by Mirza Mehdi Khan Shaghaghi (Momtahen od-Dowleh) before World War II. Eventually, important governmental buildings were built around the compound; such as the "Police House" (or the "Shahrbani House") which was built for the Shahrbani, an organization responsible for maintaining security in the city.

== Gallery ==
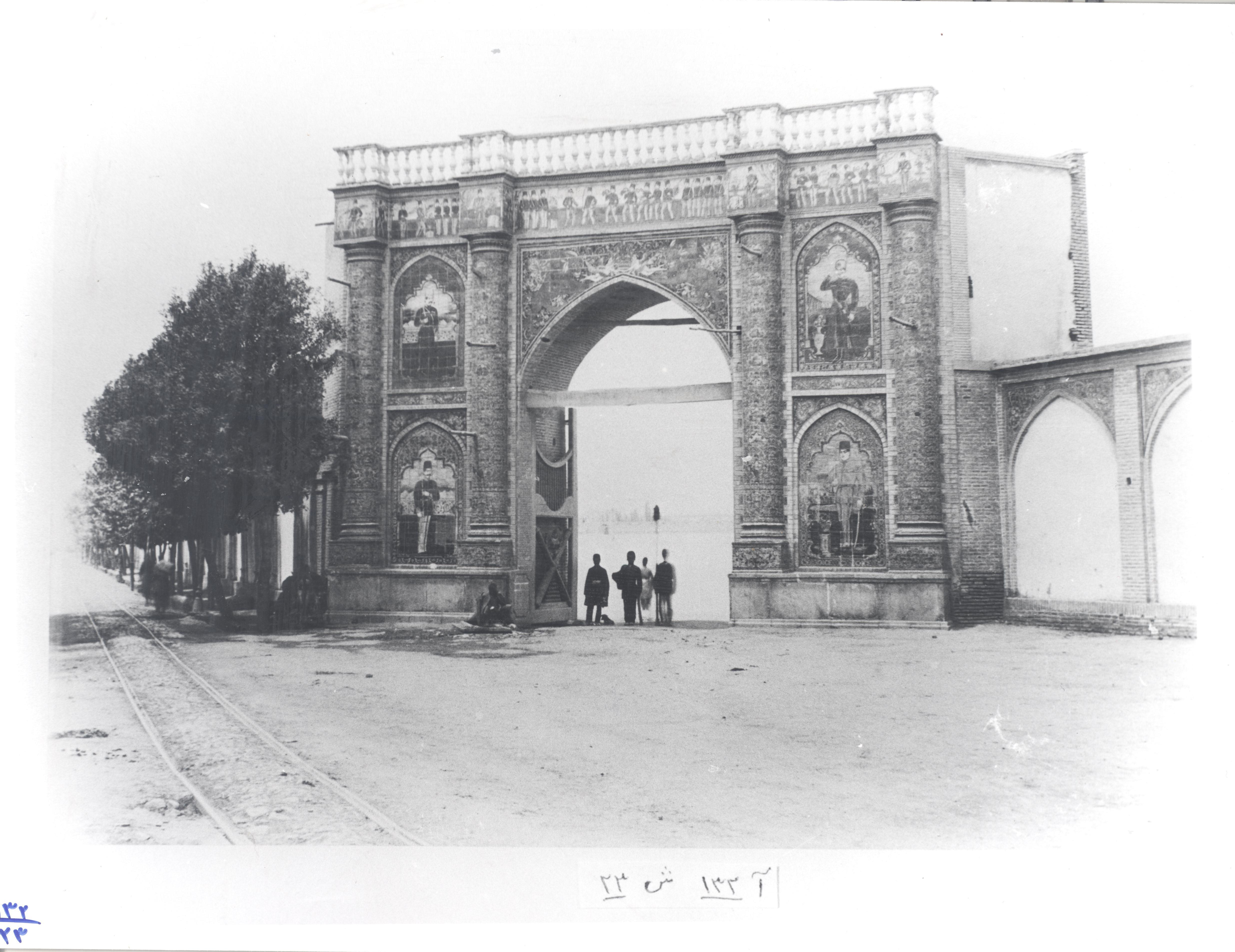
The old gate of Mashq Square, by Antoin Sevruguin

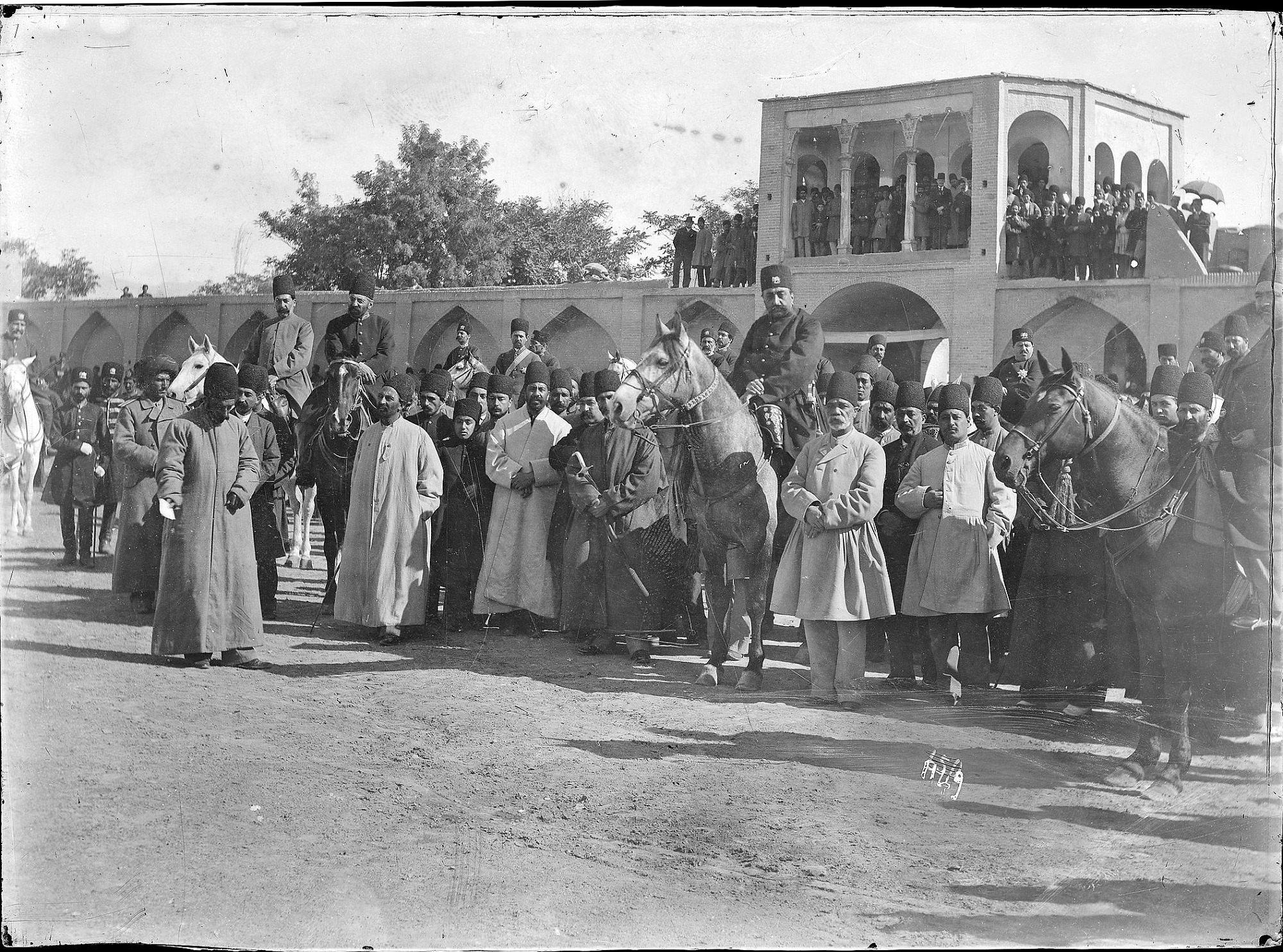
Mozaffar ad-Din Shah Qajar at Mashq Square, turn of the century

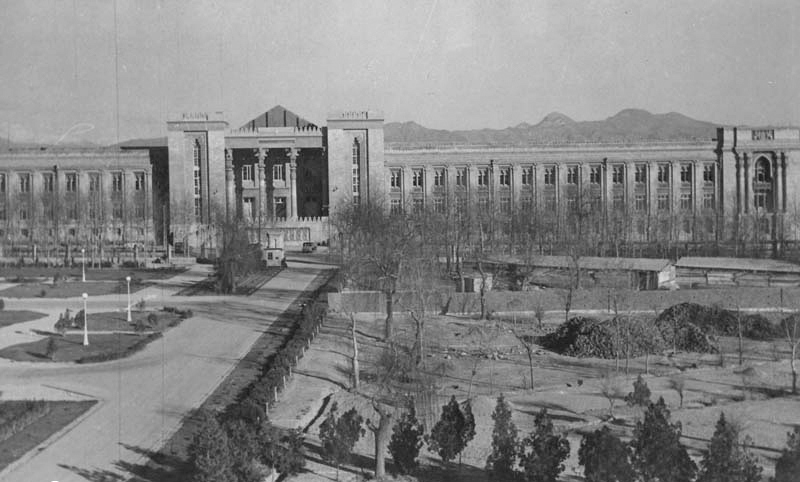
Shahrbani House, 1940s

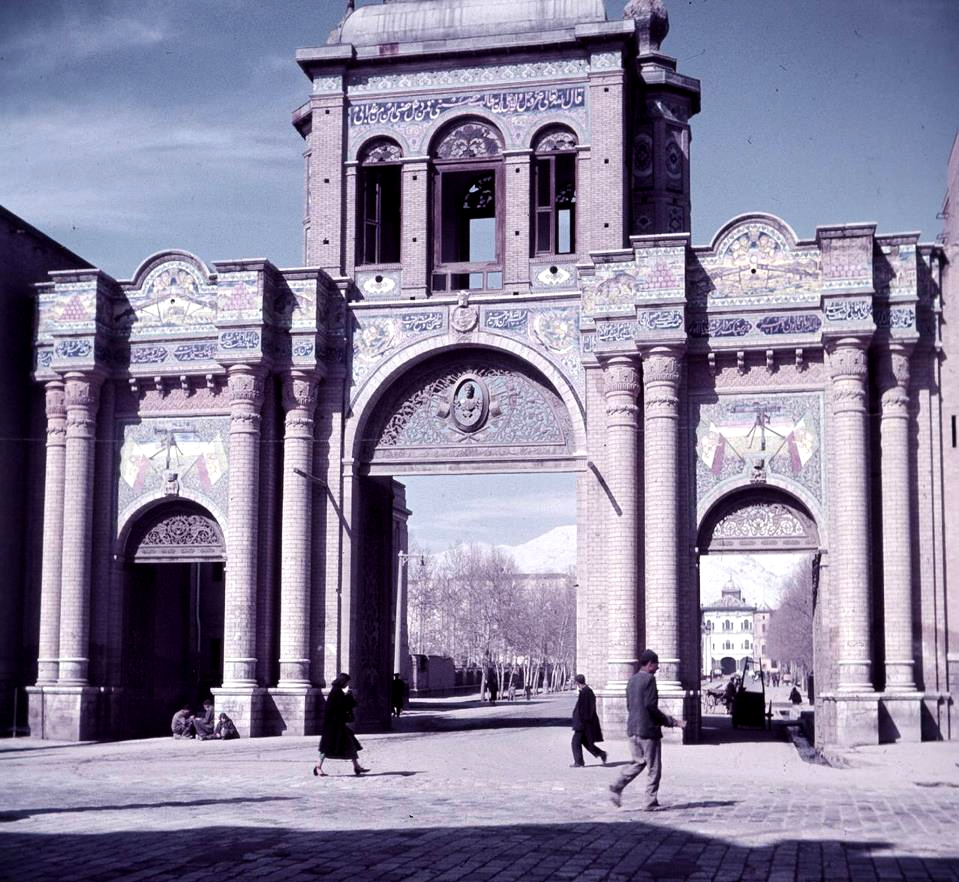
The National Garden in the 1960s

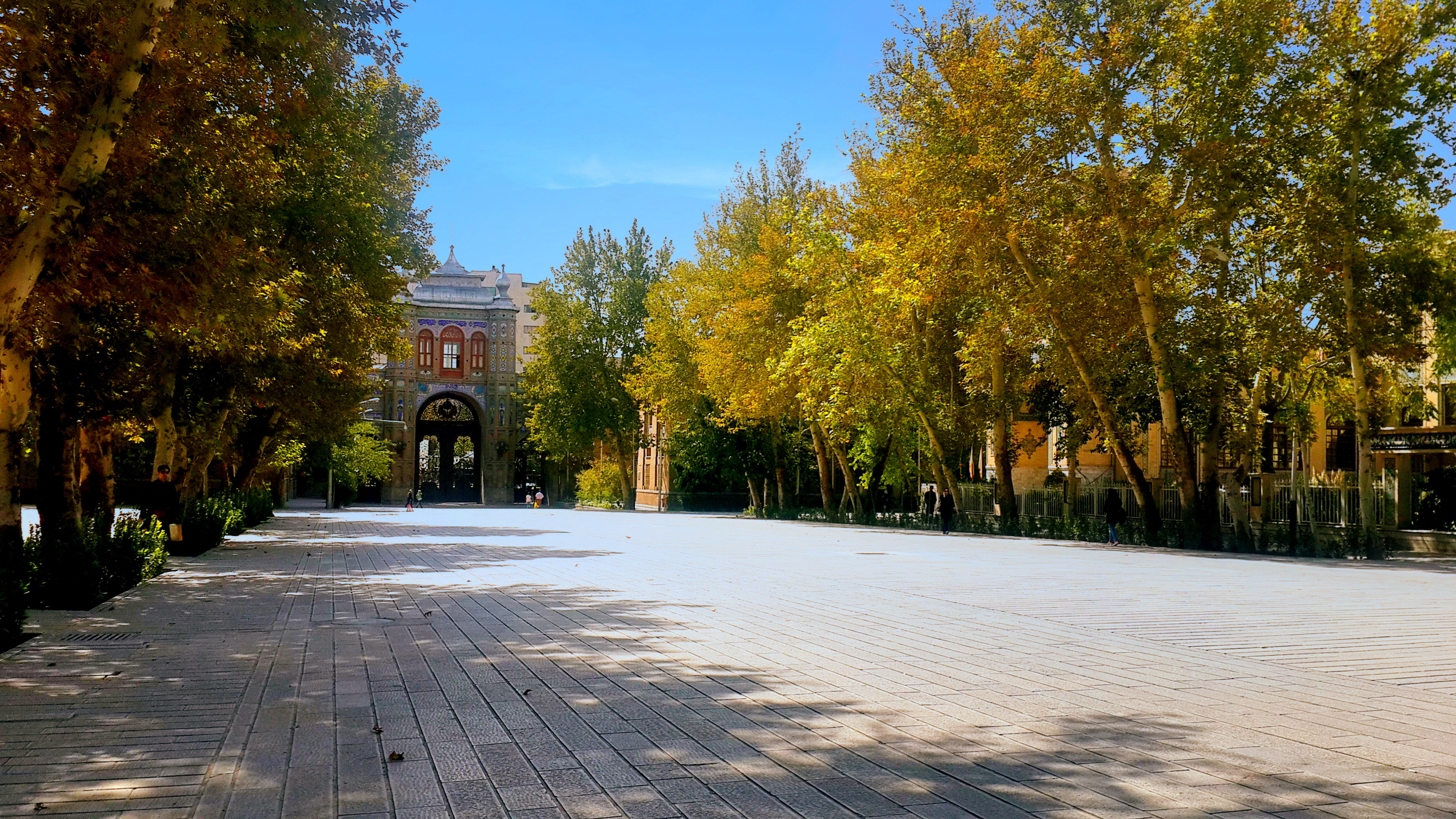
The area in front of the gate

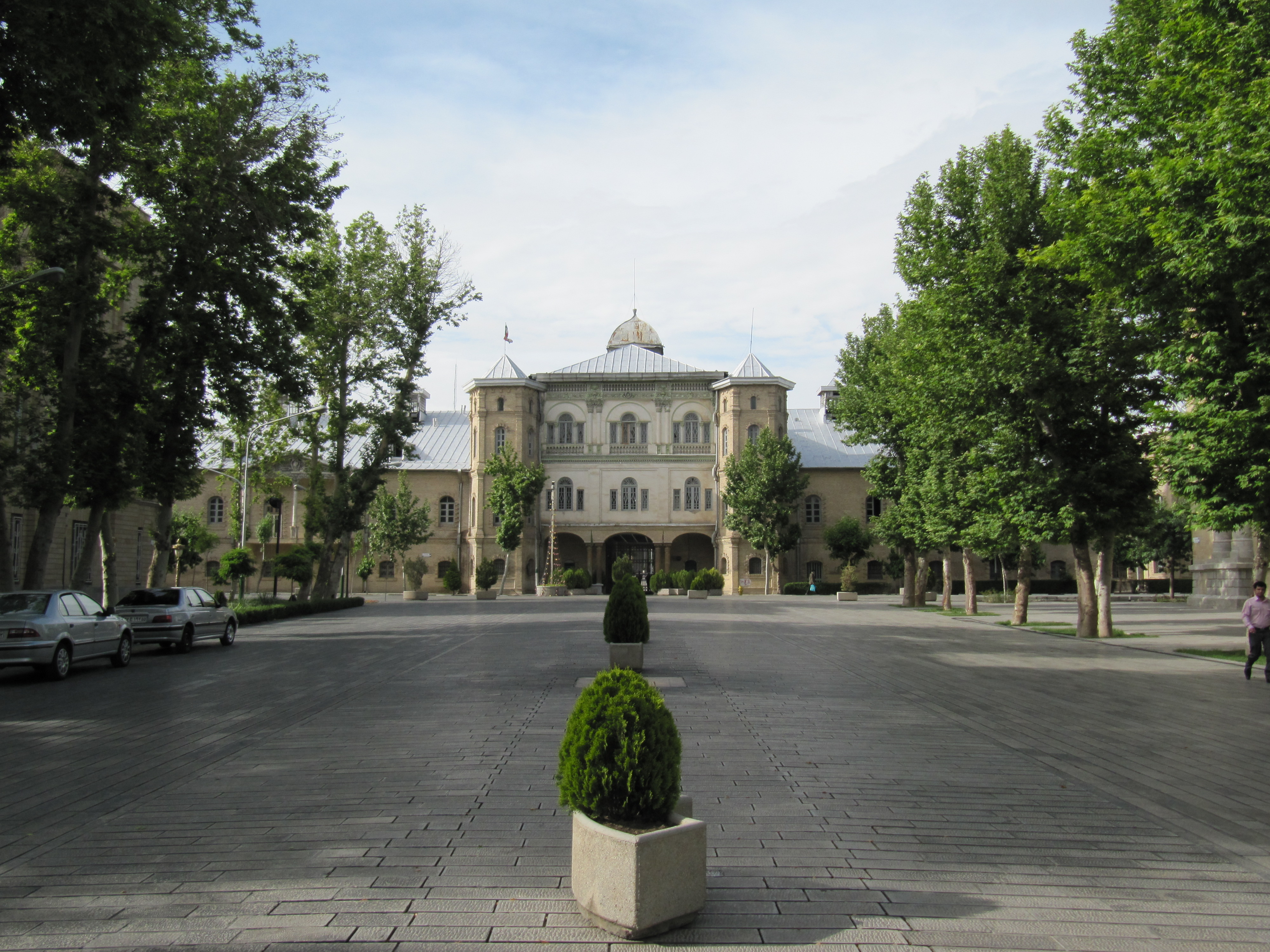
University of Art
(formerly the "Cossack House")

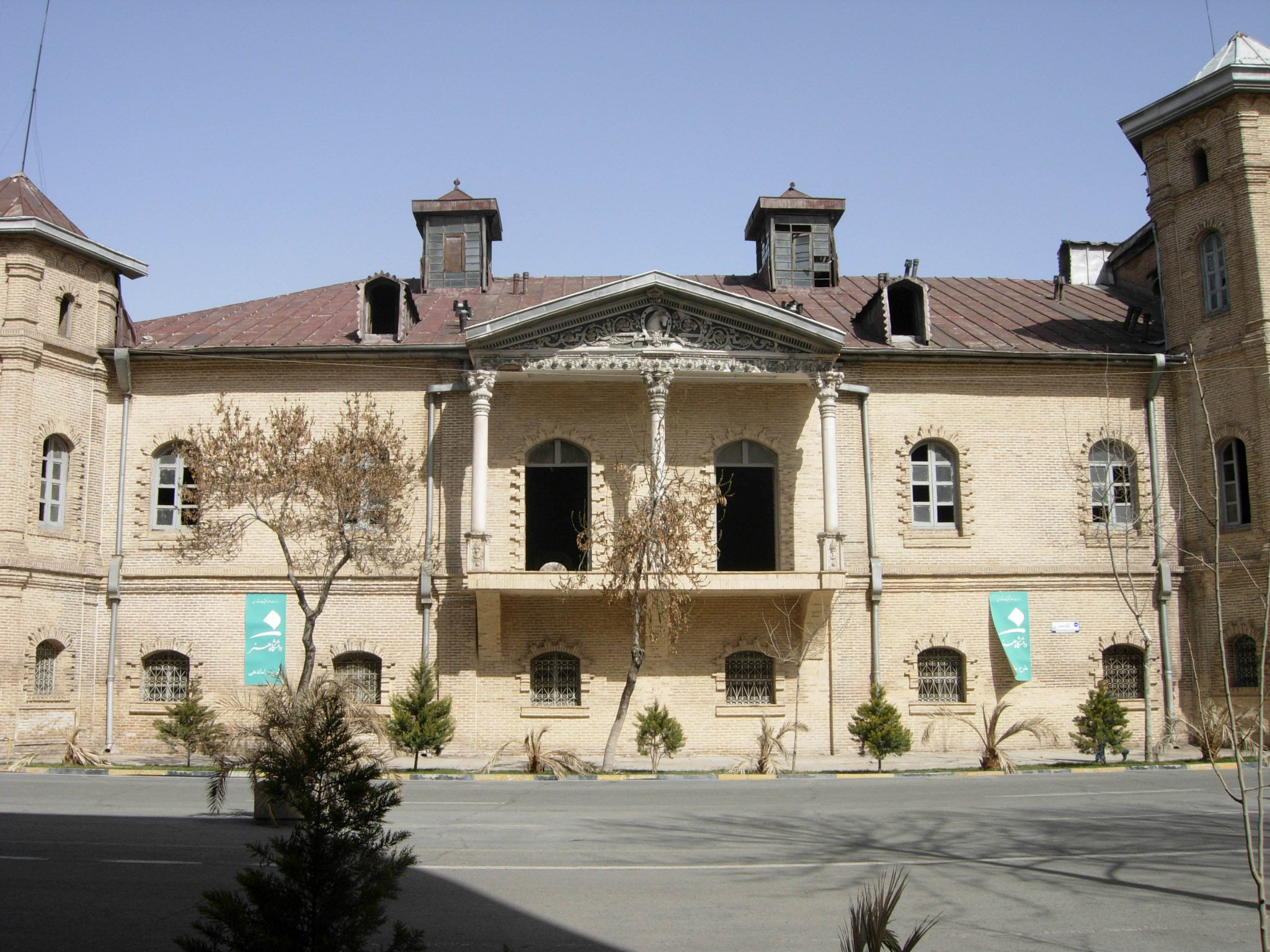
Part of the complex of the former "Cossack House"

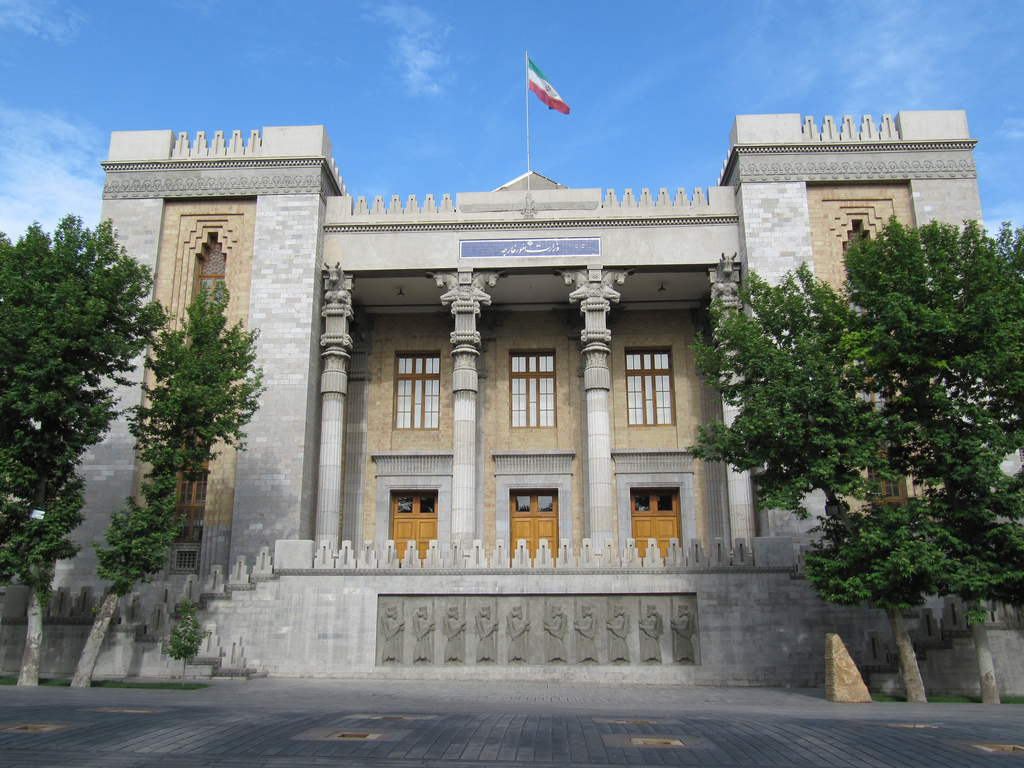
Ministry of Foreign Affairs
(formerly the "Police House")

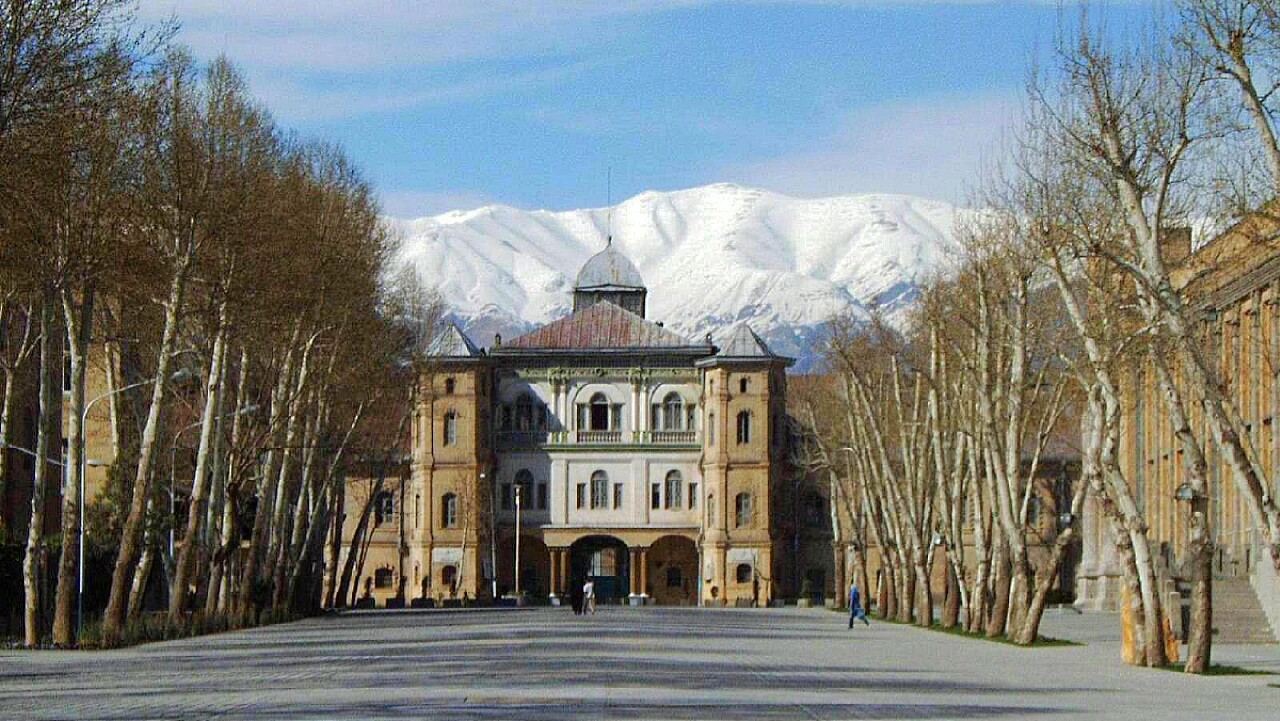
Compounds of the Foreign Ministry

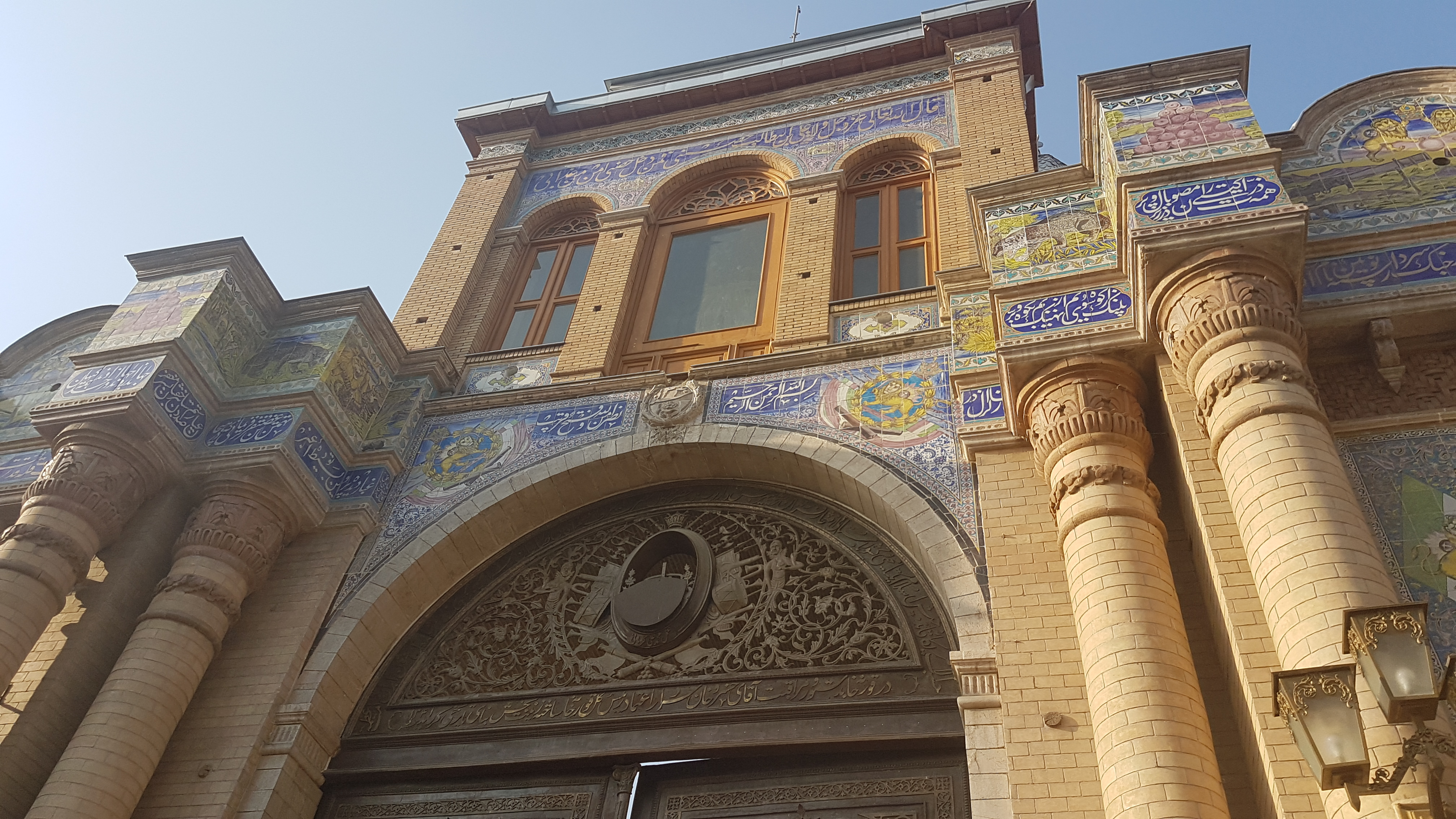
National Garden gates

== See also ==
- National Museum of Iran
- Sa'dabad Complex
- Museum of the Qasr Prison
- Ferdows Garden
