= Hossein Ardabili =

Iranian politician

Hossein Ardabili (born 1297 Hijri in Ardabil, died 20th of Ramadan 1336 hegria) was an Iranian politician.

He and completed his primary education with professor Mirza Mohammad Ali Mirakhor Oghlu in Ardabil. He went to Mashhad via Ghafghaz and acquainted with its liberals and was one of the gifted students in Mashhad.

There, he founded Khorasan magazine which was first published in 1372 hegria. The magazine became a rallying point of the Mashhad youth including Mohammad Taghi Bahar. The people of Khorasan chose Sayyid Hossein as their deputy of the majlis (parliament) in the second course of election for deputy of the national council majlis.

During his stay in Tehran, he became familiar with liberals and politicians of Iran. Meanwhile, he accepted the editorship of Iran Magazine and became successful in promoting its liberal goals.
