= Vahid Dasgardi =

Poet and orator of Iran (1880–1942)

Vahid Dasgardi وحید دستگردی
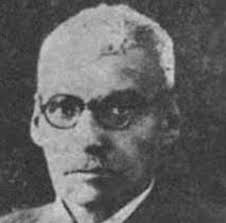
- Born: Around 1880; Isfahan
- Died: December 29, 1942; Tehran, Iran
- Occupations: Poet, writer and journalist
- Known for: He founded the newspaper "Derafsh Kaviani"

Vahid Dasgardi (Persian:وحید دستگردی), nicknamed "Vahid" was one of the poets and orators of Iran in the late 19th and early 20th centuries. He had been given the title of "The king of poets" by Ahmad Shah Qajar. He is also recognized as the founder of the former newspaper "Derafsh Kaviani"

== Background ==
Vahid Dasgardi was born around 1880 in a village near Isfahan. According to the local custom of that time, he studied the preliminary lessons privately with a teacher from the villagers. When he was about 15 years old, he went to Isfahan and lived in a boarding school. In this school, in addition to Persian literature, he learned the basics of Arabic language.
He later joined the struggle for freedom at the beginning of the Persian Constitutional Revolution and published poems and articles on this subject in Isfahan newspapers. In addition to collaborating with several newspapers at the time, Vahid Dasgardi published the "Derafsh Kaviani" newspaper in Isfahan at the beginning of the First World War.

There is no exact information about the date of his marriage. As much as he got married and had three children. His eldest son was killed in the bombing incident in the office of the Prime Minister of Iran in 1981 in Tehran.
