= Hossein Agha Malek =

Iranian philanthropist (1871–1972)

Hajj Hossein Malek
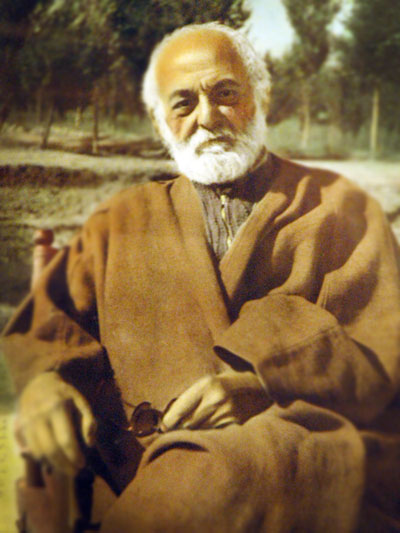
- Hossein Agha Malek in 1960
- Born: حسین آقا ملک; 31 May 1871; Tehran, Sublime State of Iran
- Died: 26 July 1972 (aged 101); Tehran, Imperial State of Iran
- Burial place: Imam Reza shrine, Mashhad, Iran
- Known for: philanthropy

Hajj Hossein Malek (Persian: حسین آقا ملک; 31 May 1871 – 26 July 1972) was an Iranian philanthropist.

Malek was born of a Georgian mother and a Tabrizi father. He was the son of Hadj Mohammad Kazem Malek-ol-Tojjar, (the king of all merchants) a title given to his father by Naser al-Din Shah Qajar due to his importance as a tâjer in the commerce in Tabriz and also between Iran and Russia. His father also constructed the first road from Astara to Moscow.

Malek studied Persian and Arabic under the tutelage of Sheikh Massih Taleghani and later Mirza Abolhassan Jelveh, the most prominent scholars of the period. From a very early age he became interested in books and fascinated by literature, history, Islamic law and religion as well as numismatics and art.

He was fascinated by rare books and started collecting from a very early age. This interest led to the creation of an incredible collection of manuscripts and printed books. It eventually became the Malek National Library and Museum, one of the most important cultural institutions in West Asia. The library holds a notable collection of over 20,000 and 42000 volumes of printed books from the early Islamic period to the present. Malek was also interested in other media and collected paintings, prints, farmans and decrees, penboxes, lacquer, metalwork, coins, stamps, carpets and textiles.

Malek built hospitals, orphanages and schools for the people of Khorasan. An enormous amount of agricultural land, property and wealth was given as waqf (وقف, lit. '"religious donation"') in 1937 to the Imam Reza shrine in Mashhad, the Astan Quds Razavi. This was mainly for the upkeep and the development of the collection and the museum which was to remain under his supervision until his death in 1973 and then to pass on to the Astan Quds for public use. His waqf is considered the most important in Iran in size, value, and importance. Where other waqfs were devoted to mosques or religious institutions, his was devoted to education and art. Despite his amazing wealth, he is more known for his considerable philanthropy.

Before his passing he asked his daughters to keep watch over the museum, a few of whom are still present today. Although scattered, they all still hold strong their roles as moderators and take part in many of the annual events.
