= Hajj Mohammad Nakhjavani =

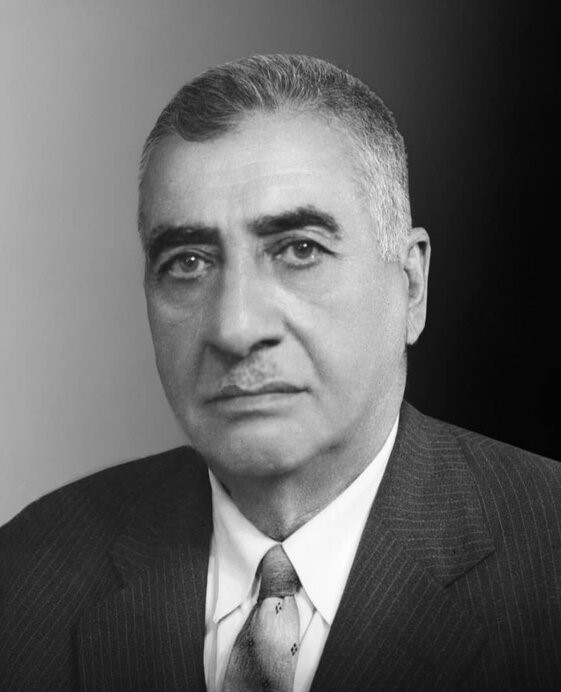
Portrait of Hajj Mohammad Nakhjavani

Hajj Mohammad Nakhjavani (Persian: حاج محمد نخجوانی; 1880 – 1962) was an Iranian businessman, scholar, and collector of manuscripts. Born in Tabriz, he received his education at the Talebiya school, where he was taught Arabic and Persian grammar and literature. He followed his father career as a merchant in the bazaar of Tabriz, simultaneously growing an interest in gathering rare manuscripts.

== Sources ==
- Ettehad, Hushang (2009). "Naḵjavāni, Ḥājj Moḥammad". Encyclopædia Iranica, online edition. New York.
