= Mohammad Hasan Afshar =

Qajar Persian court painter (fl c. 1835–1865)

- محمد حسن افشار
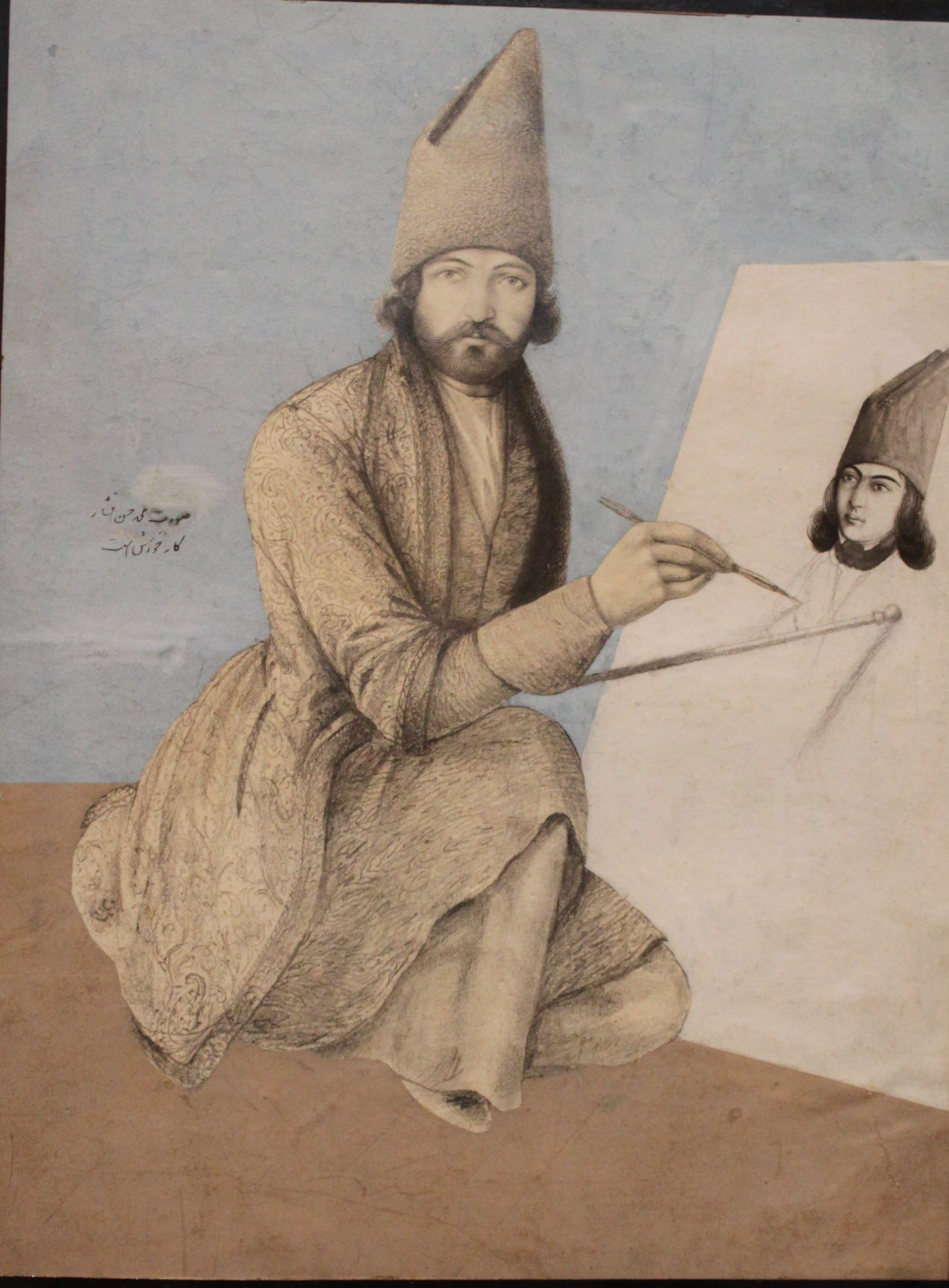
- Self-portrait of Mohammad Hasan Afshar, dated 1840–1860
- Died: c. 1880
- Other names: Muhammad Hasan Afshar
- Occupation: Persian court painter

Mohammad Hasan Afshar (Persian: محمد حسن افشار; fl c. 1835–1865) was a Persian court painter and portraitist, serving under the Qajar shahs (kings) Mohammad Shah Qajar (r. 1834–1848), and Naser al-Din Shah Qajar (r. 1848–1896).

== Biography ==
Mohammad Hasan belonged to the Afshar tribe of Urmia. He was one of the few Iranian artists of the 19th-century who drew the praise of European observers, including the French explorer Xavier Hommaire de Hell. The modern Iranian historian Mohammad Ali Karimzadeh Tabrizi has brought out the confusion in writings surrounding Mohammad Hasan and his namesakes. Due to his congenital deafness, he has been mistaken for another Afshar painter, Abu'l-Hasan Afshar, who may have had the same condition but otherwise seemed to have been a different individual. Afshar also painted small varnished objects, such as Islamic pen boxes (Persian: فلمدان, romanized: qalamdan). Mohammad Hasan died in c. 1880.

Examples of Afshar's work

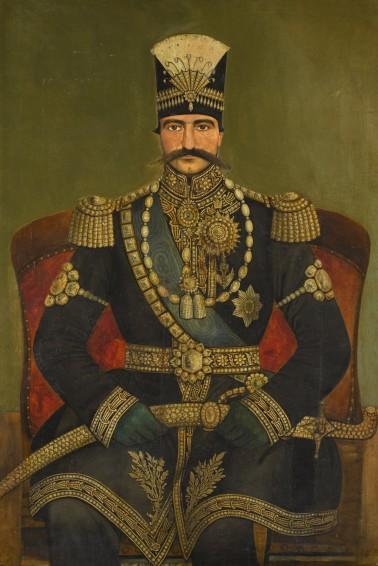
Portrait of Nasir al-Din Shah

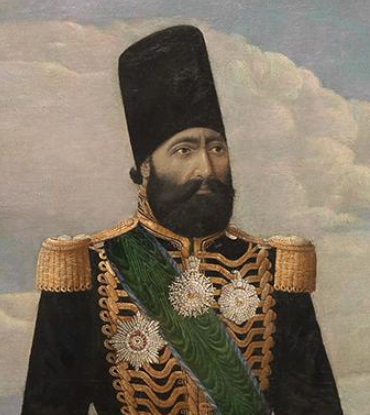
Portrait of Mirza Mohammad Khan Sepahsalar

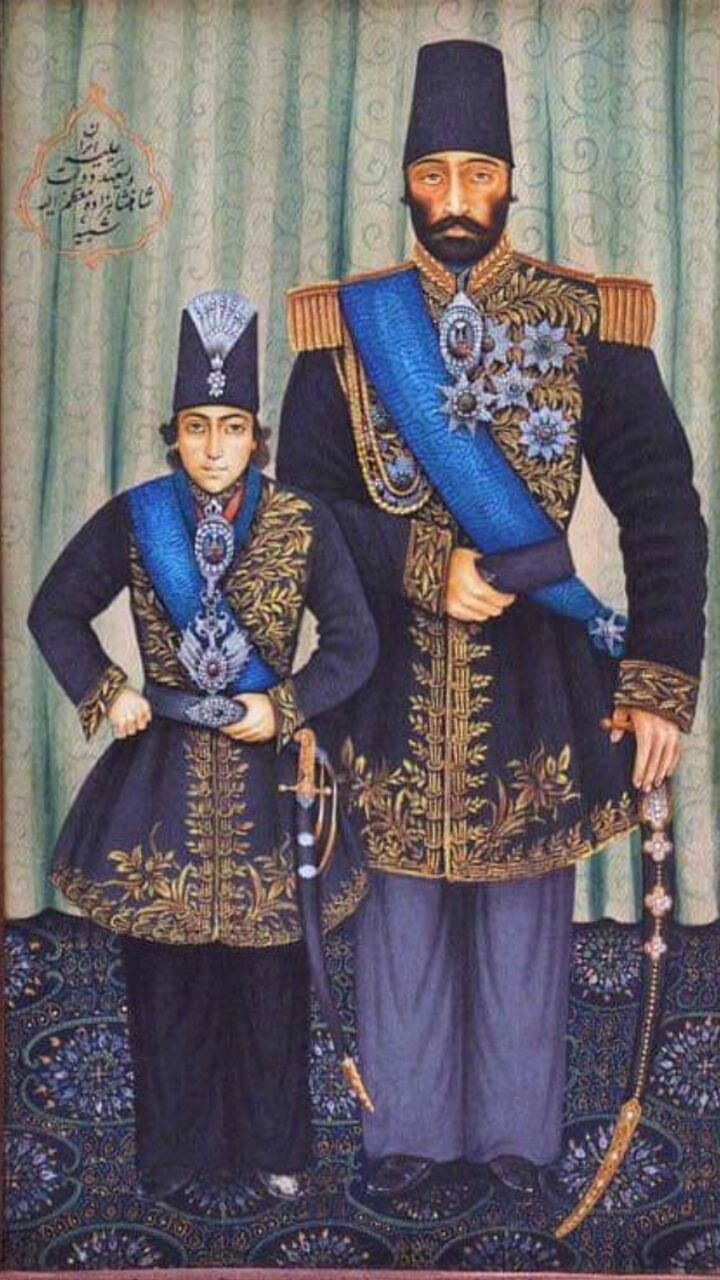
Portrait of Mozaffar ad-Din Shah and Aziz Khan Mokri

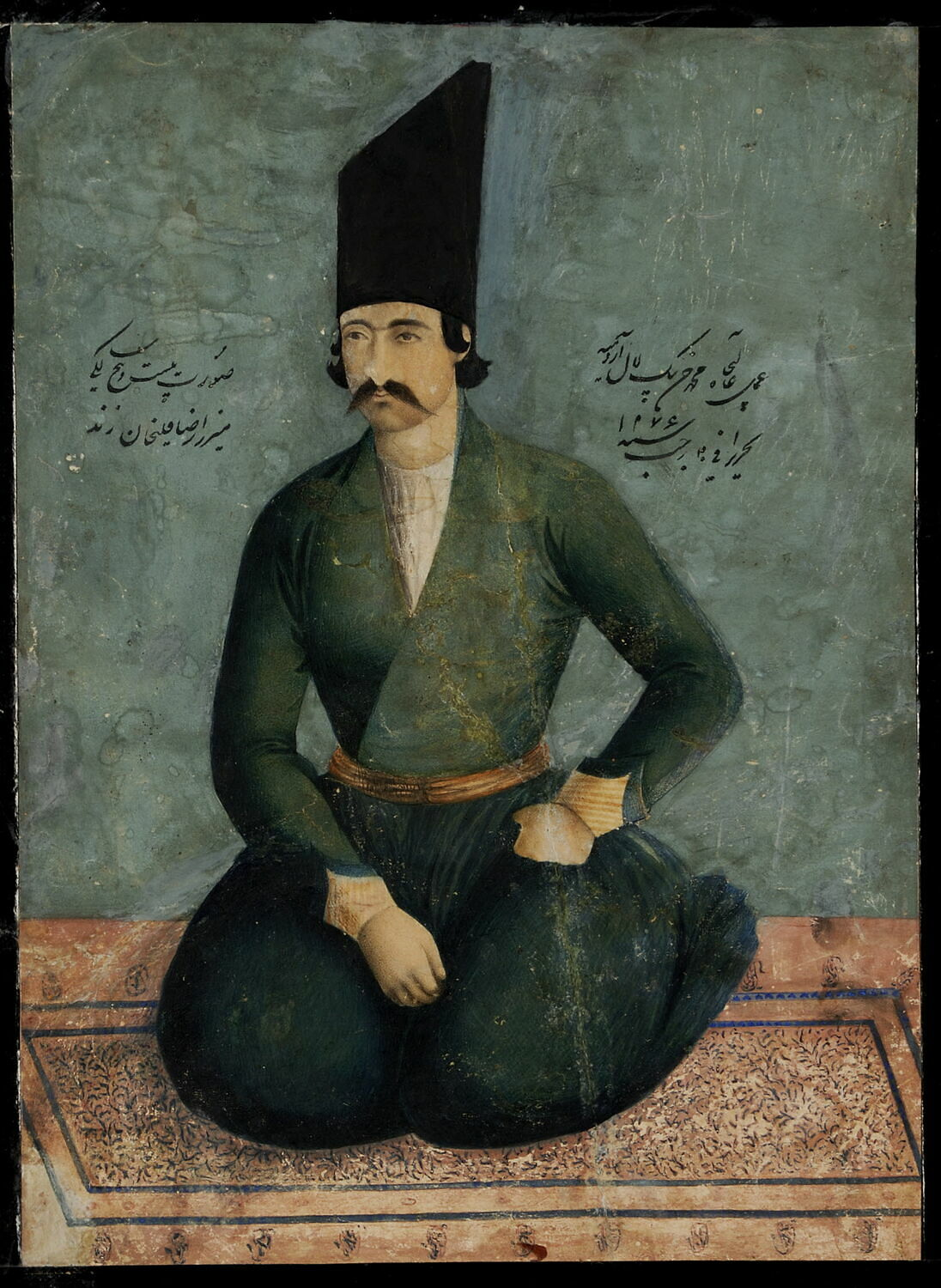
Portrait of Mirza Reza Quli Khan Zand

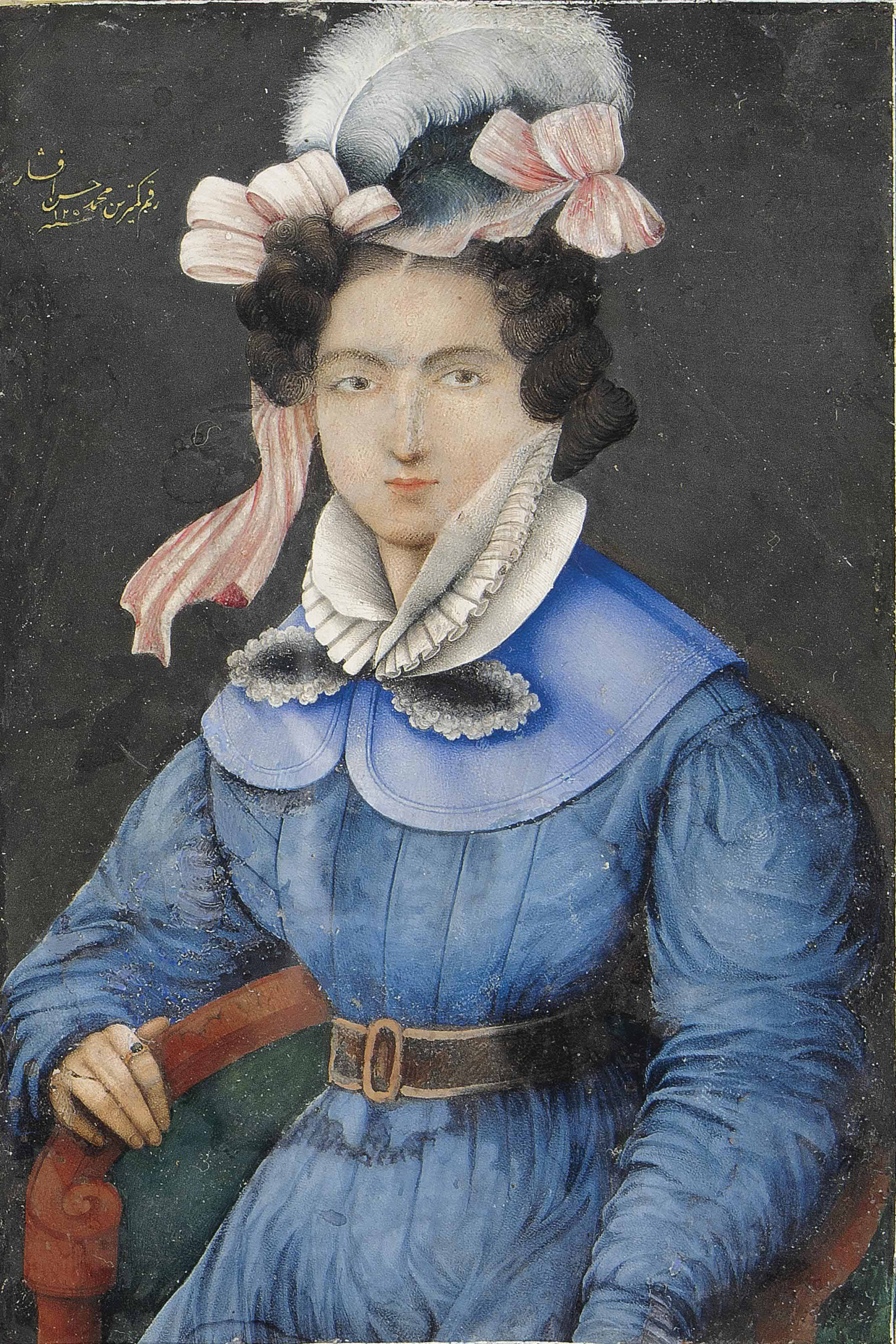
"Portrait of a young lady", dated 1838–1839

== See also ==
- Abdallah Khan, Qajar Persian court architect

== Sources ==
- Bloom, Jonathan M.; Blair, Sheila S. (2009). "Muhammad Hasan Afshar". Oxford University Press.
- Szántó, Iván (2012). "Allah-Wirdī Afšār, Court Painter of 'Abbās Mīrzā". In Jeremiás, Eva M. (ed.). At the Gate of Modernism: Qajar Iran in the Nineteenth Century. Gorgias Press. pp. 1–8. ISBN 978-6155343018.
