= Jameh Mosque of Tabriz =

Mosque in Tabriz, Iran

Jāmeh Mosque of Tabriz
- مسجد جامع تبریز

- Location of the mosque in Iran

Religion
- Affiliation: Shia Islam
- Ecclesiastical or organisational status: Friday mosque
- Status: Active

Location
- Location: Tabriz, Tabrīz County, East Azerbaijan
- Country: Iran
- Coordinates: 38°4′51.57″N 46°17′25.5″E

Architecture
- Type: Mosque architecture
- Style: Safavid
- Founder: Shah Sultan Hossein
- Completed: Safavid era

Specifications
- Length: 60 m (200 ft)
- Dome: One (maybe more)
- Minaret: Two
- Inscriptions: Two
- Materials: Bricks; marble; tiles

Iran National Heritage List
- Official name: Friday Mosque of Tabriz
- Type: Friday Mosque
- Designated: 1932
- Reference no.: 171
- Conservation organization: Cultural Heritage, Handicrafts and Tourism Organization of Iran

The Jāmeh Mosque (Persian: مسجد جامع تبریز, romanized: Masjid-e-Jāmeh Tabrīz), also known as the Jame’ Mosque of Tabriz and historically as the Kabiri Jame, (Note: Other names include: Tabriz Central Mosque, Masjid-e-Jaameh Tabriz, Tabriz Jame' Mosque, Masjid Jame Tabriz, and Friday Mosque of Tabriz.) is a large Shi'ite Friday mosque, located in Tabrīz city, in the province of East Azerbaijan, Iran. The mosque is situated in the Tabriz suburb of Bazaar, next to the Grand Grand Bazaar of Tabriz and the Constitution House of Tabriz. The mosque was built during the Safavid era.

The mosque was added to the Iran National Heritage List in 1932, administered by the Cultural Heritage, Handicrafts and Tourism Organization of Iran.

== Overview ==
The grand rectangular mosque has two entrances and a large shabestan. Its arches and domes are placed on octagonal brick columns, decorated with delicate and artistic plaster works. The mihrab is high and decorated with plaster works and its high dome is decorated with various mosaic tiles. There are two inscriptions, one of which states that the mosque built by the decree of the Shah Sultan Hossein, a Safavid ruler; and the other inscription is a dream by Shah Tahmasb I. The basement of the mosque and the old prayer hall, contain traces of colored plaster works, from the Seljuk and Ilkhanate eras. The dome was added in the late 16th century, during the reign of Uzun Hasan of the Aq Qoyunlu dynasty.

The mosque has been remodelled many times and as of March 2025, the mosque consisted of four interconnected mosques, namely the Great Hojjat al-Islam Mosque, the Small Hojjat al-Islam Mosque, the Ismail Khan Qoli Mosque, and the Alchaq Mosque, which together form the Jāmeh Mosque.

== Gallery ==
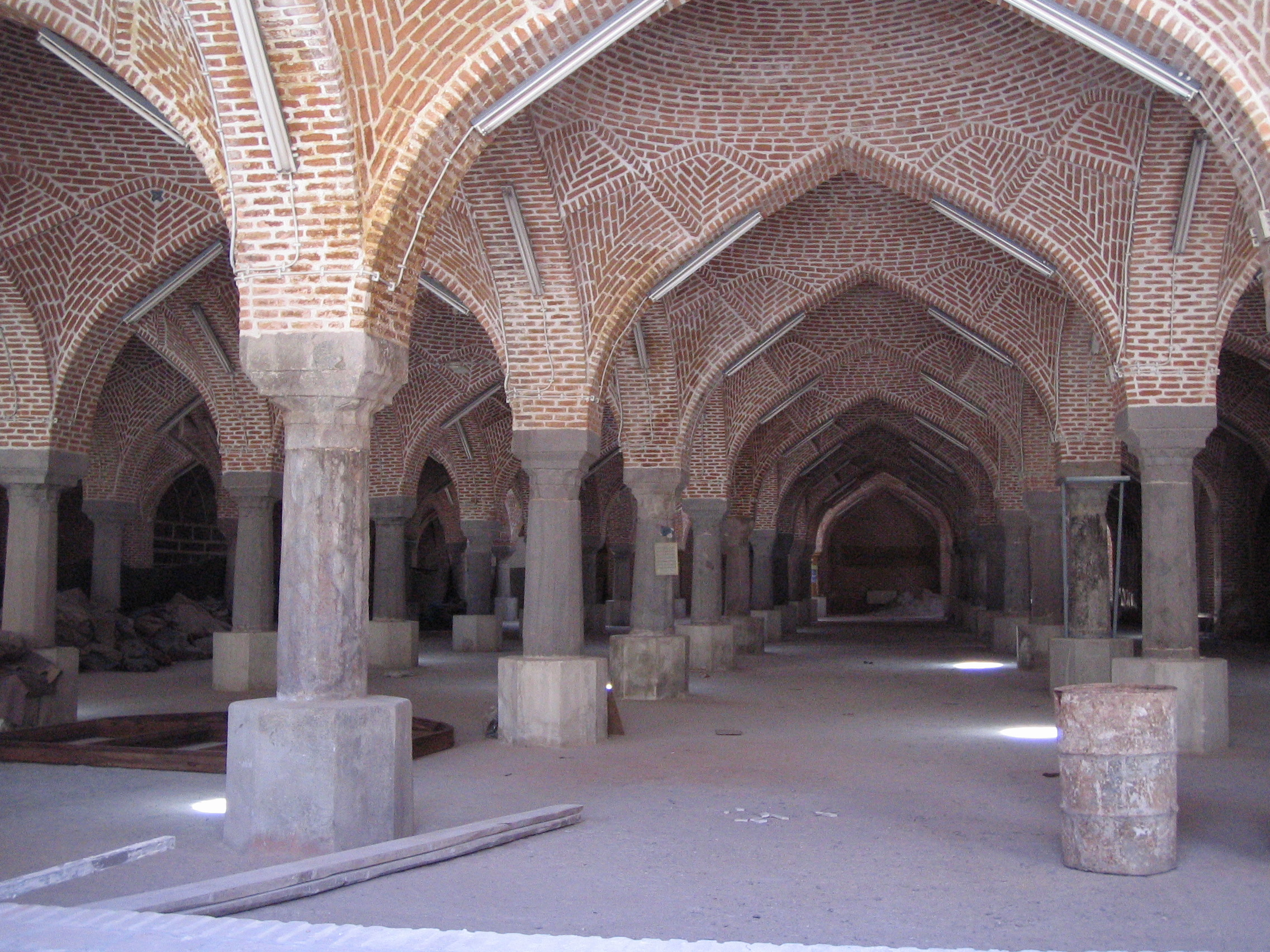
Recovery of main Shabestan

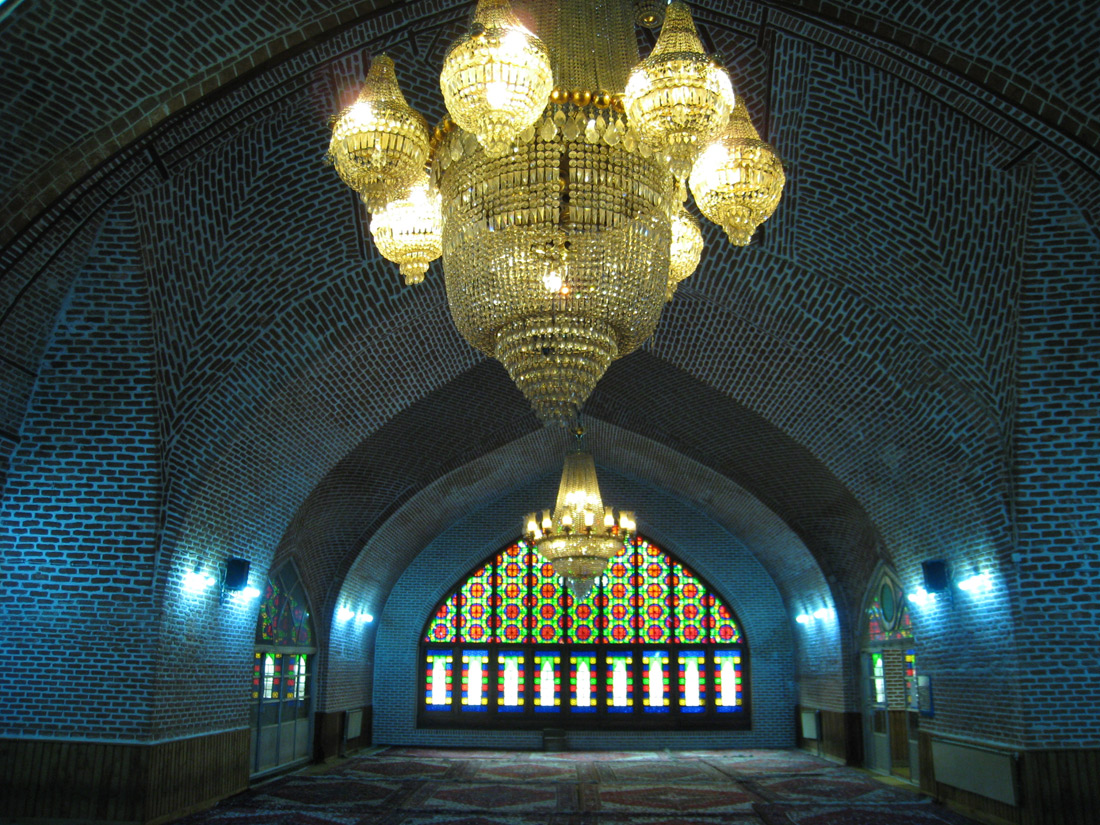
Main Shabestan after recovery

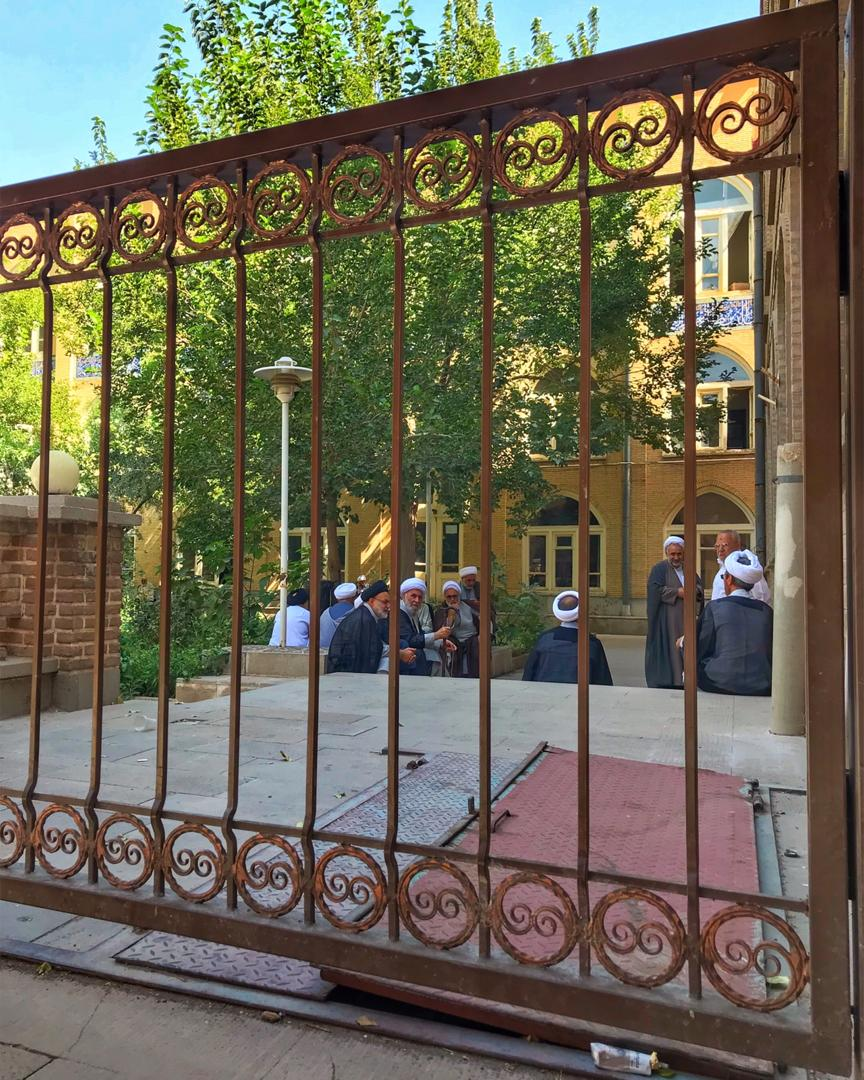
Scholars in the mosque

== See also ==
- Shia Islam in Iran
- List of mosques in Iran
