= Jameh Mosque of Dezful =

Mosque in Dezful, Iran

- مسجد جامع دزفول
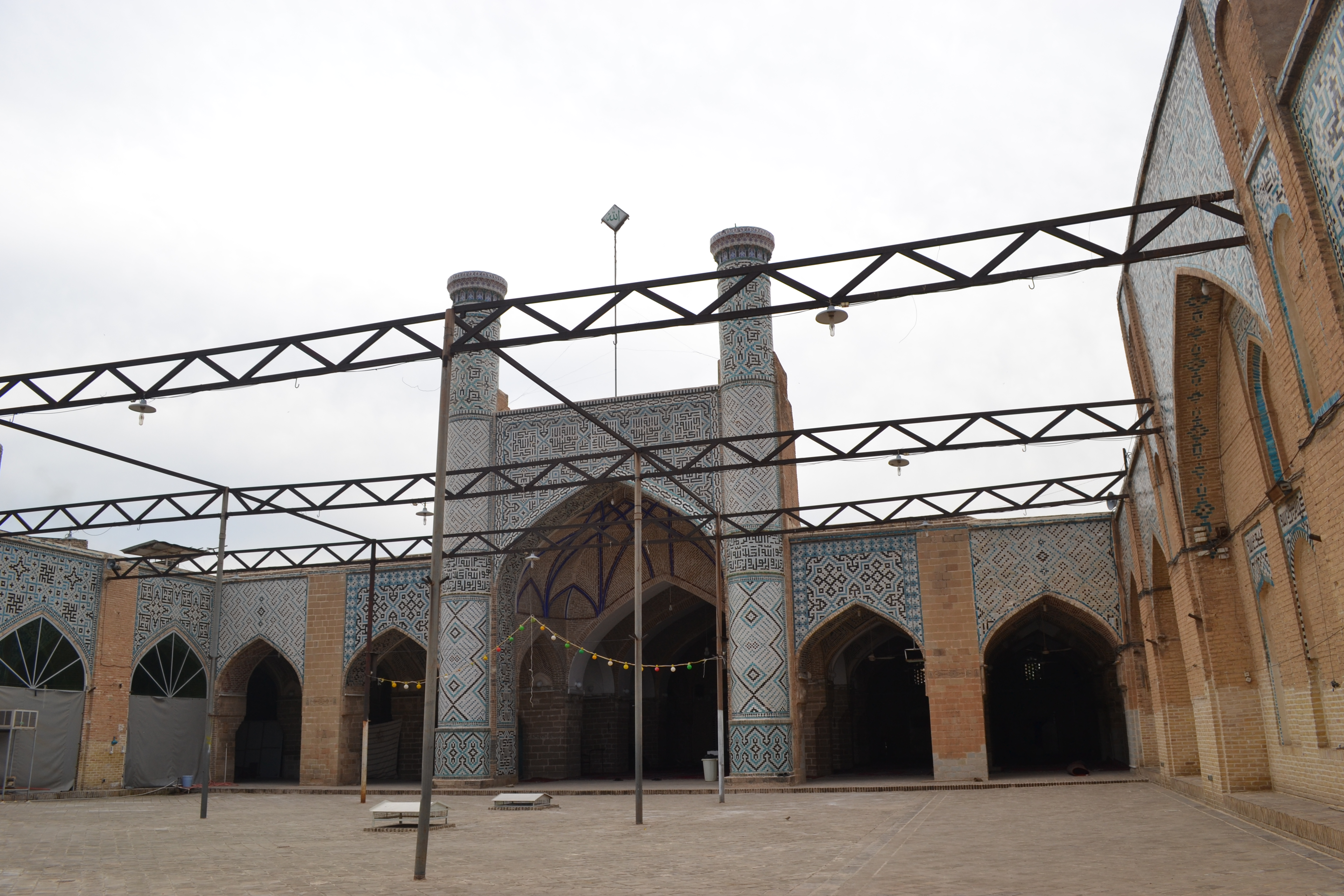
- The 12th-century AH iwan, leading to the mosque's prayer hall, in 2014

- Location of the mosque in Iran

Religion
- Affiliation: Shia Islam
- Ecclesiastical or organisational status: Friday mosque
- Status: Active

Location
- Location: Dezful, Khuzestan Province
- Country: Iran
- Coordinates: 32°23′00″N 48°23′58″E

Architecture
- Type: Mosque architecture
- Style: Sasanian; Safavid; Qajar
- Completed: c. 3rd or 4th century AH; (c. 7th or 8th centuries CE)

Specifications
- Dome: One (maybe more)
- Minaret: Two
- Materials: Stone; bricks; ceramic tiles

Iran National Heritage List
- Official name: Friday Mosque of Dezful
- Type: Friday Mosque
- Designated: 1937
- Reference no.: 287
- Conservation organization: Cultural Heritage, Handicrafts and Tourism Organization of Iran

The Jameh Mosque of Dezful (Persian: مسجد جامع دزفول), also known as the Great Mosque of Desfool, is a Shi'ite Friday mosque located in Dezful, in the Dezful County of the province of Khuzestan, Iran. Situated on Imam Khomeini Street, the mosque was completed in c. 3rd or 4th century AH (c. 7th or 8th centuries CE) in the Sasanian architecture style, and is the oldest and first mosque in Dezful, and one of the oldest mosques in Iran.

The mosque was added to the Iran National Heritage List on 20 December 1936, administered by the Cultural Heritage, Handicrafts and Tourism Organization of Iran.

== Architecture ==
The Jameh Mosque of Dezful is one of the oldest mosques in Iran, believed to have been constructed during either the 3rd or 4th centuries of the Islamic calendar, which equates to the 7th or 8th centuries in the Common Era. The mosque was restored and expanded during the 7th, 9th and 11th centuries AH, particularly during the Safavid and Qajar dynasties. More recent renovations have improved ventilation and allow for natural light to illuminate previously dark areas.

The mosque comprises a main iwan, porches, a large sahn, and Shabestans to the south and east. The mosque has four small iwans, three of which are blocked. The north-west façade and minarets date from the 12th century AH and are adorned with arches and ceramic tiles. The main part of the current mosque is its pillared Shabestan to the south, built from stone. The ceiling and brick dome of this Shabestan are erected on stone pillars. The eastern porch was constructed during the Safavid era, while the Shabestan of the mosque is its oldest segment. The northern and western side walls date from the 13th and 14th centuries AH.

The mosque's grand dome is constructed entirely of bricks. The walls are made with a mix of cob coatings and bricks, that provides excellent thermal insulation, especially during hot summers. The tile work is predominantly from the Qajar era, that are adorned with Kufic calligraphy and intricate geometric motifs. The mihrab features stucco decorations that serve religious functions and also highlight the mosque's role as a center of cultural expression and artistic achievement.

== Gallery ==
Tiled interior of the dome

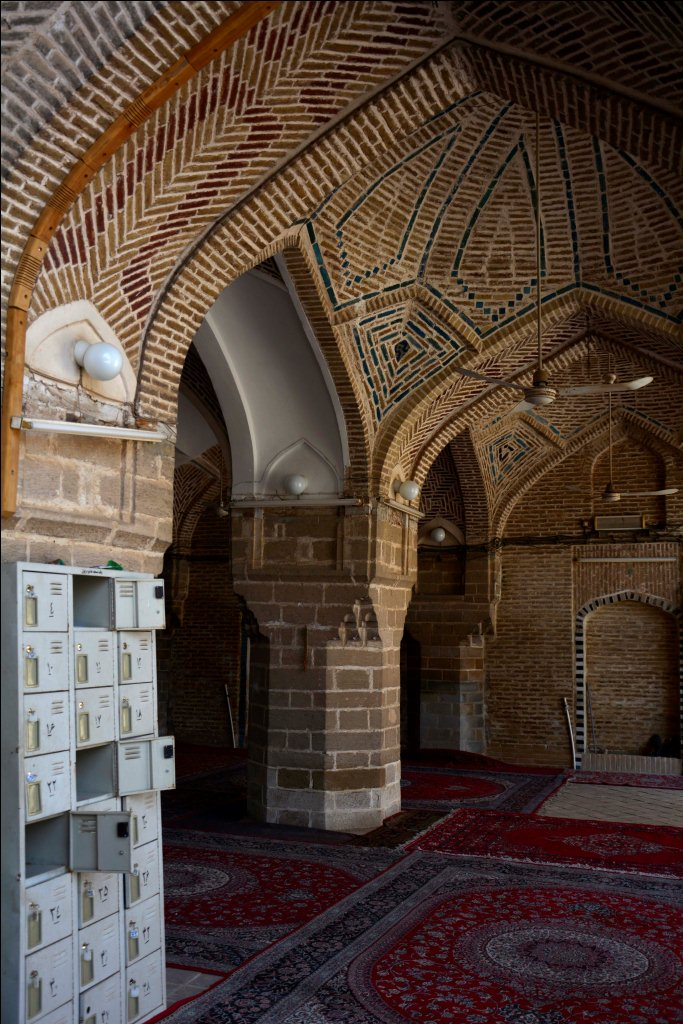
Brick interior of the arches, with modern additions

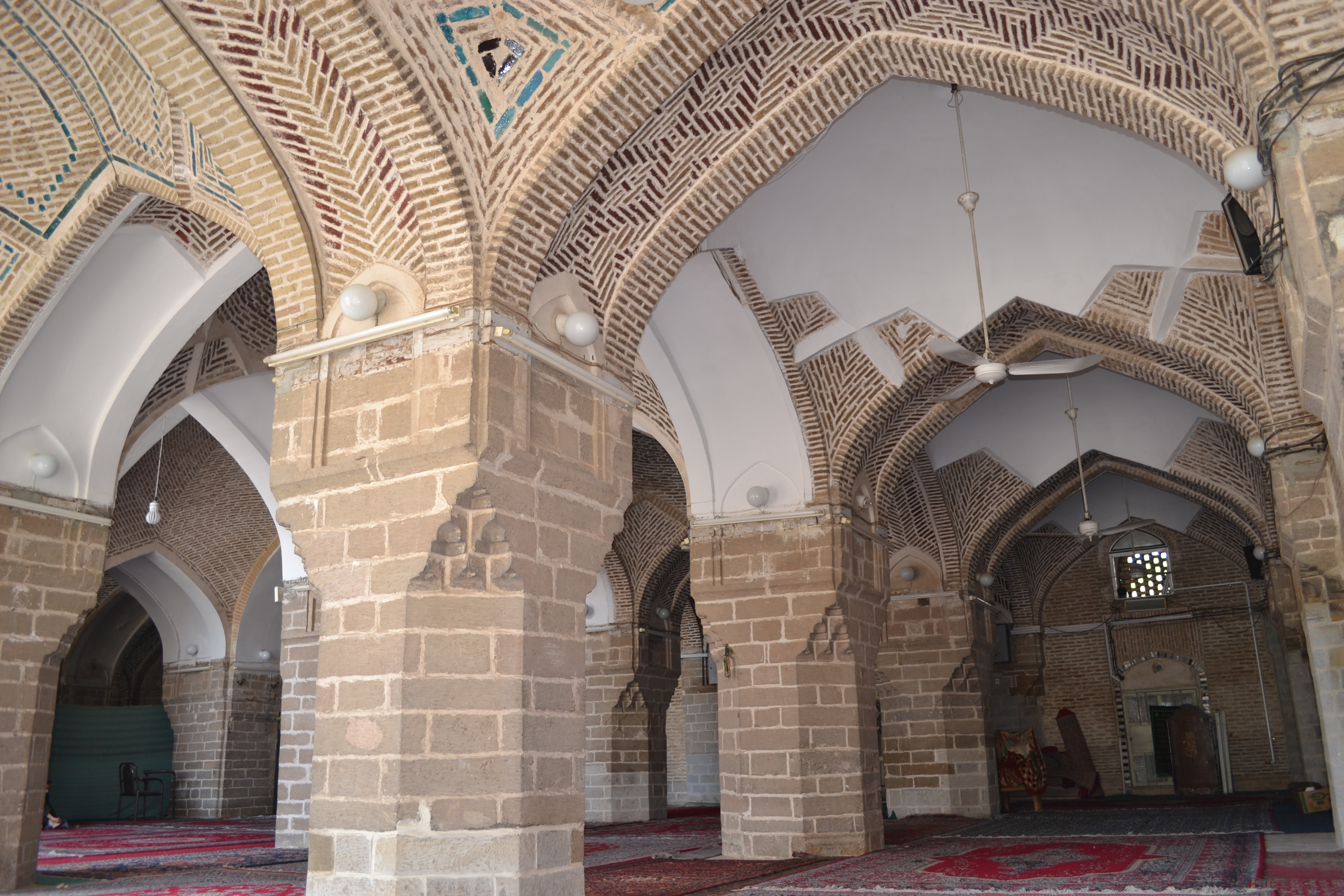
Brick interior of the Shabestan

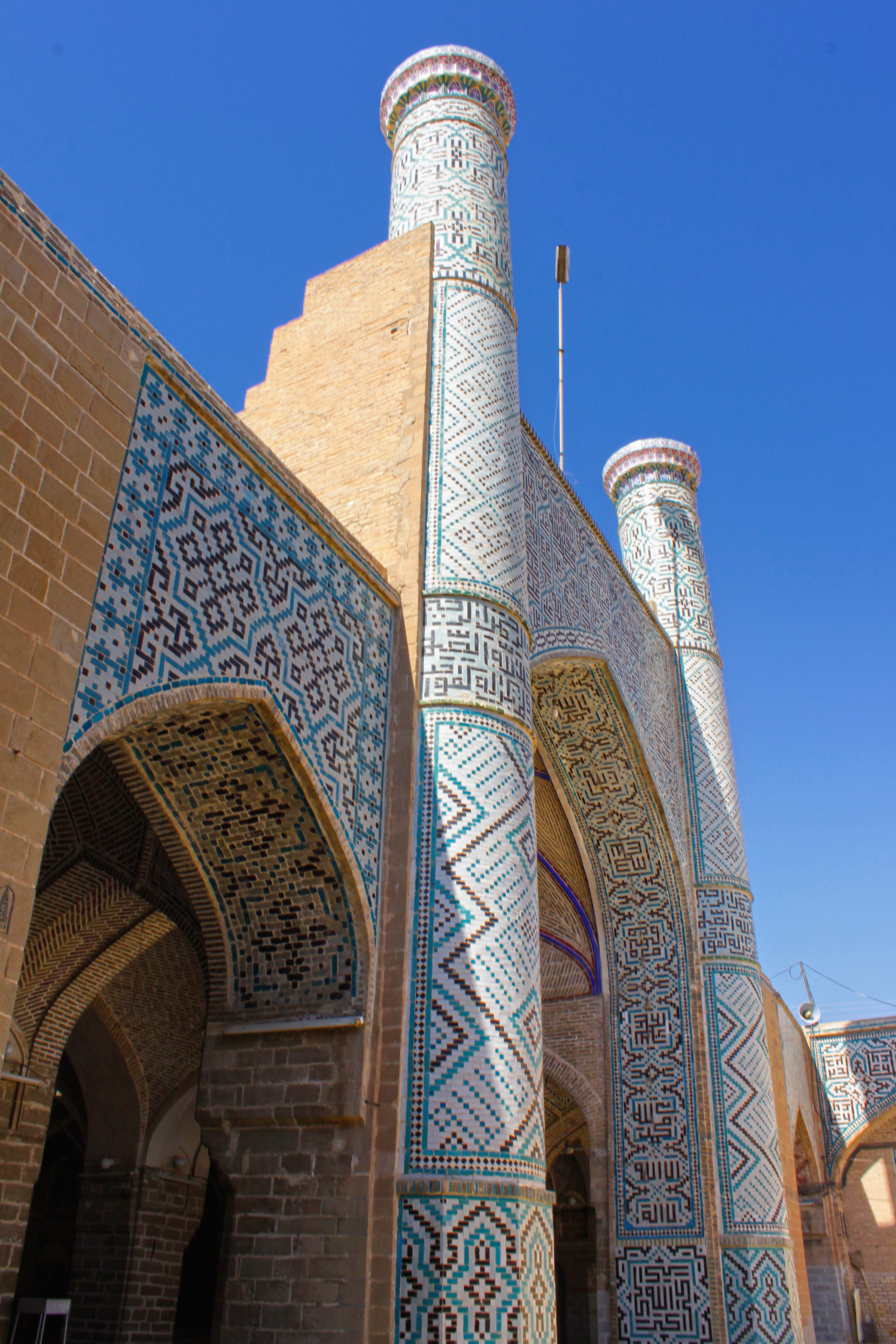
The tiled north-west iwan, with minarets

== See also ==
- Shia Islam in Iran
- List of mosques in Iran
- List of oldest mosques in Iran
