= Bazaar of Tabriz =

UNESCO World Heritage Site in Iran

Tabriz Historic Bazaar Complex
UNESCO World Heritage Site
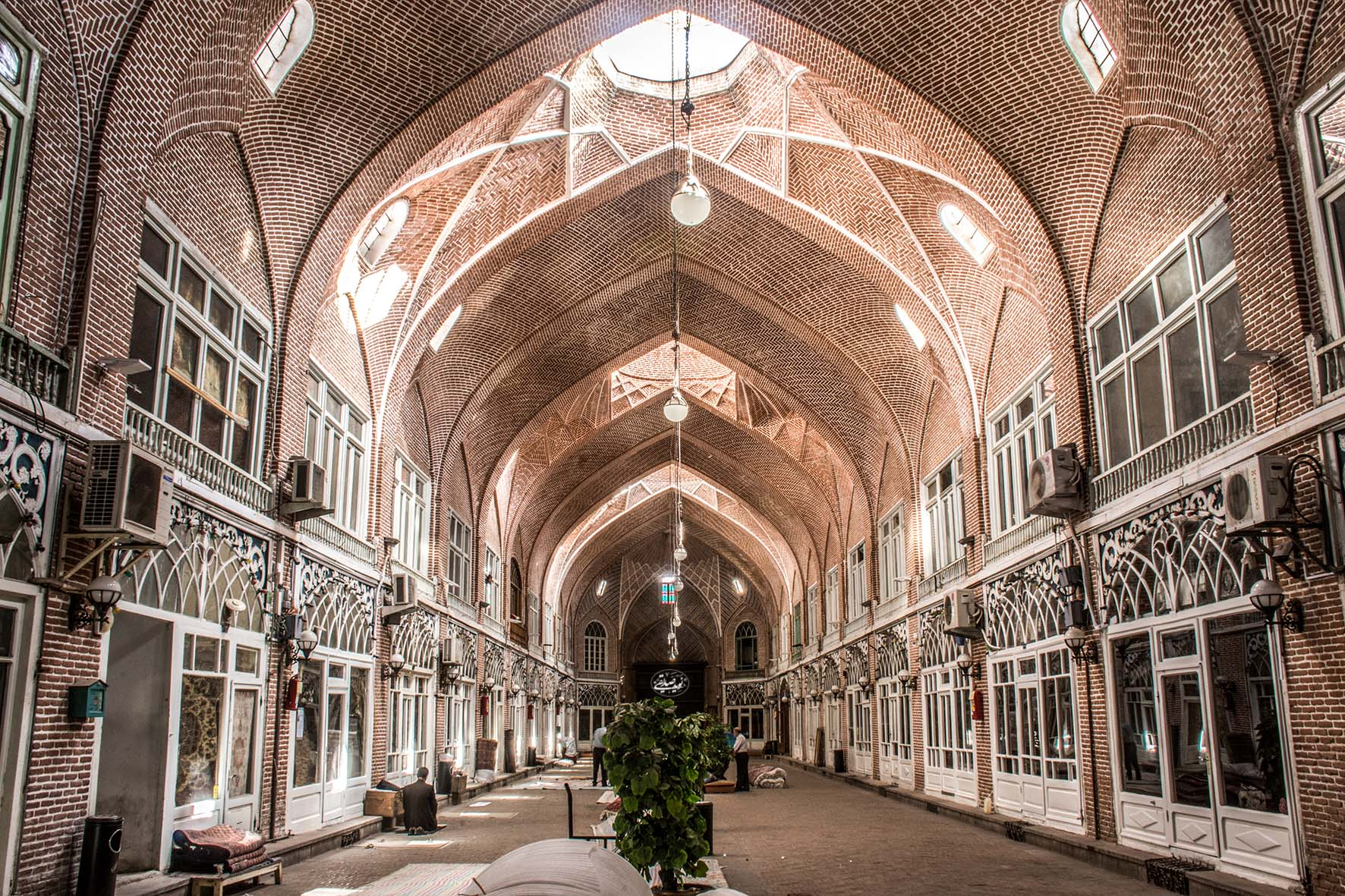
- Mozaffariyeh, Grand Bazaar of Tabriz, Iran

- Location within Iran Location within West and Central Asia
- Location: Tabriz, Iran
- Criteria: Cultural: ii, iii, iv
- Reference: 1346
- Inscription: 2010 (34th Session)
- Area: 28.9733 ha (71.595 acres)
- Buffer zone: 75.4082 ha (186.338 acres)
- Coordinates: 38°04′51″N 46°17′32″E

The Bazaar of Tabriz (Persian: بازار تبریز, romanized: Bāzār-e Tabriz) is a historic market in central Tabriz, Iran. It is one of the oldest bazaars in the Middle East and one of Iran's UNESCO World Heritage Sites.

== History ==
Tabriz has been a place of cultural exchange since antiquity. Its historic bazaar complex is one of the most important commercial centres on the Silk Road. A bazaar has existed on the same site since the early periods of Iranian urbanism following Islam. The bazaar was mentioned by the Venetian traveler Marco Polo, who claimed to have passed through it while journeying on the Silk Road.

Al-Maqdisi in 10th century, Yaqut al-Hamawi in ca. 1213 CE, Zakariya al-Qazwini in ca. 1252 CE, Marco Polo in 1271 CE, Odoric of Pordenone in ca. 1321 CE, Ibn Battuta in ca. 1330 CE, Ambrogio Contarini in 1474 CE, Hamdallah Mustawfi in around 13th to 14th century, John Cartwright in 1606 CE, Jean Chardin at the time of Suleiman I of Persia, Jean-Baptiste Tavernier in ca. 1636 CE, Giovanni Francesco Gemelli Careri in ca. 1642 CE and dozens of other explorers and historians have written about the Bazaar of Tabriz, which shows its importance and significance through the different periods of history.

Located in the center of the city of Tabriz, the structure is divided into rows, many devoted to particular categories of product. These include Amir Bazaar (for gold and jewelry), Mozzafarieh (hand woven rugs, sorted by knot size and type), Bashmakhchi Bazaar (shoes), Kiz Basdi Bazaar, and Rahli Bazaar (produce). Tabriz and its bazaar were at their most prosperous in the 16th century, when the town became the capital city of Safavid Iran. The city lost this status in the 17th century, but its bazaar has remained important as a commercial and economic hub in the region and on the silk road. Although numerous modern shops and malls have been established in recent years, Tabriz Bazaar has kept its vital role as economic hub of the city and northwestern Iran.

Nowadays, the bazaars primary visitors are Iranian Azerbaijanis.

The bazaar was inscribed as a World Heritage Site by UNESCO in July 2010.

== Ceremonies ==
The bazaar is used for some important religious ceremonies.

== Restoration ==
In 2000, the Historical Hermitages Organization of Iran begin a restoration project of the Bazaar, with the full participation of the shop owners. The rehabilitation project won the Aga Khan Award for Architecture in 2013.

== Photo gallery ==
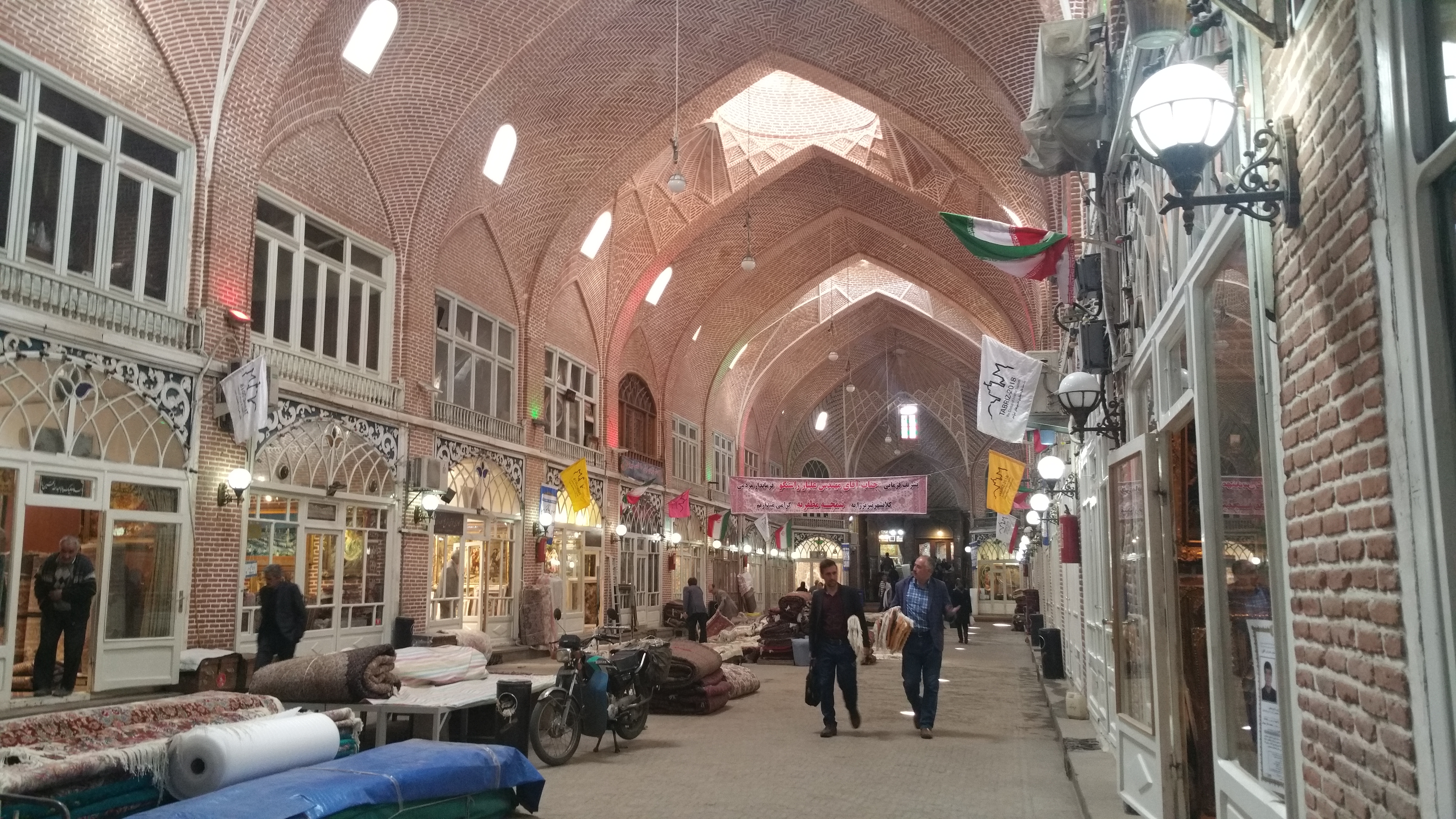
Mozaffarieh, a major row for hand woven rugs in Tabriz Grand Bazaar.

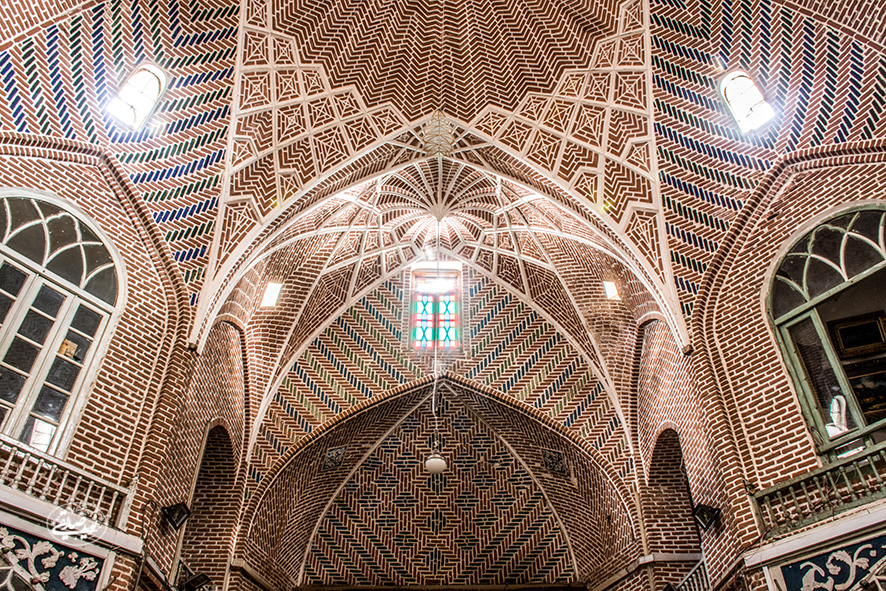
Mozaffariyeh, Bazaar of Tabriz.

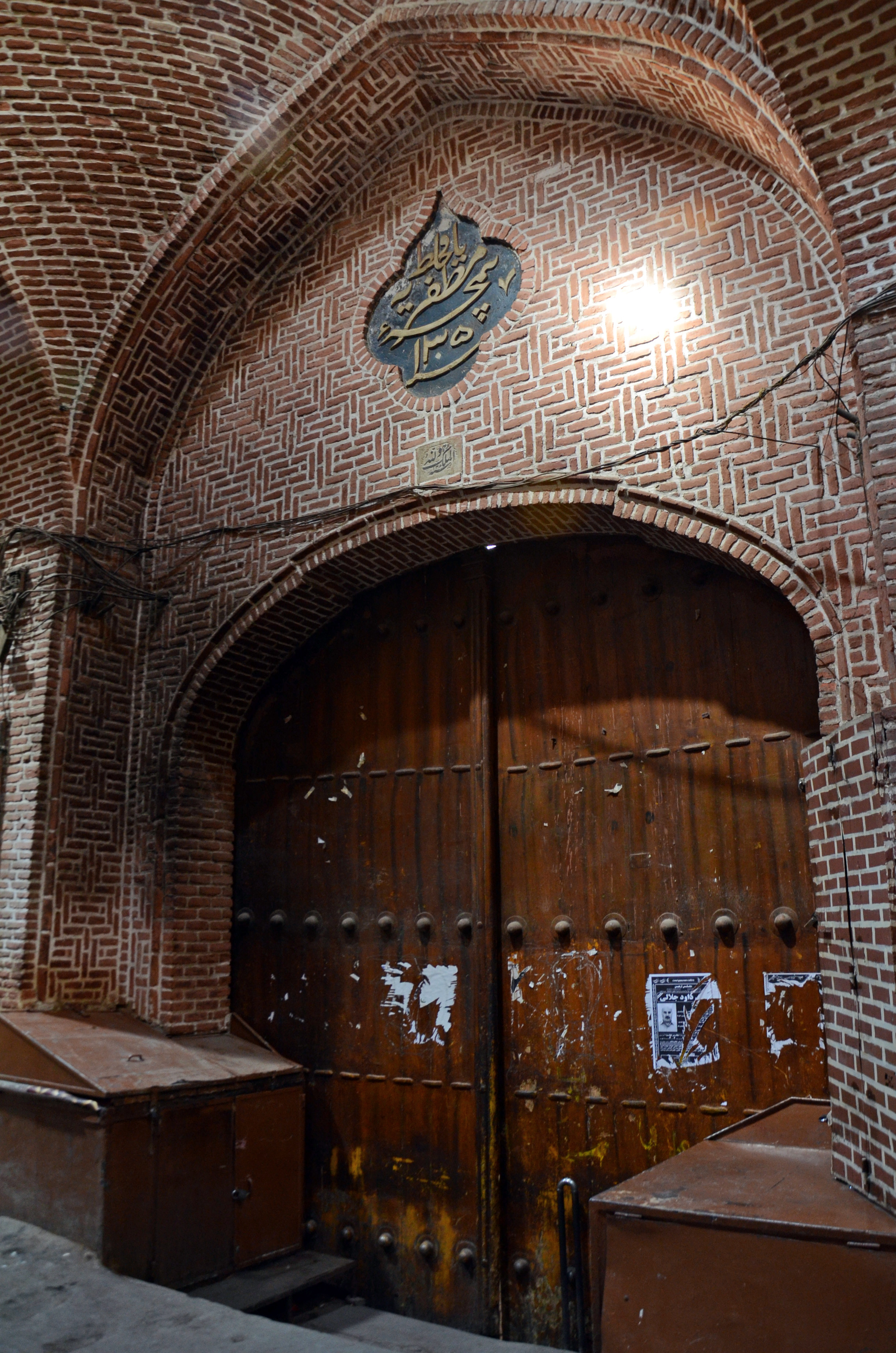
One of two entrance gates to Mozzafariyeh.

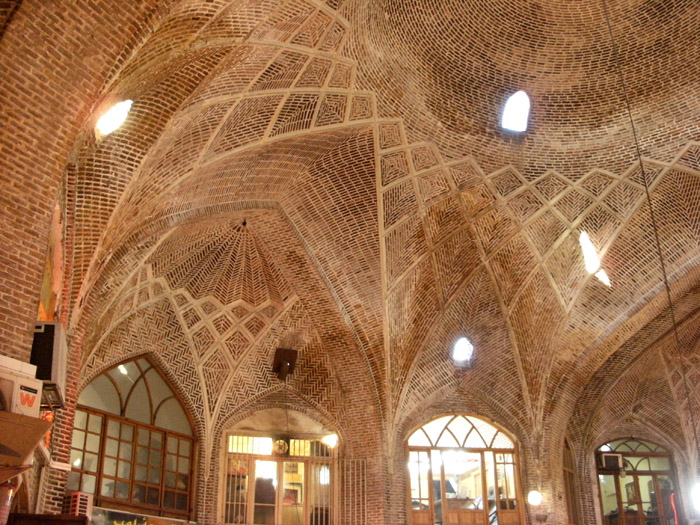
Dome in Amir row of Bazaar.

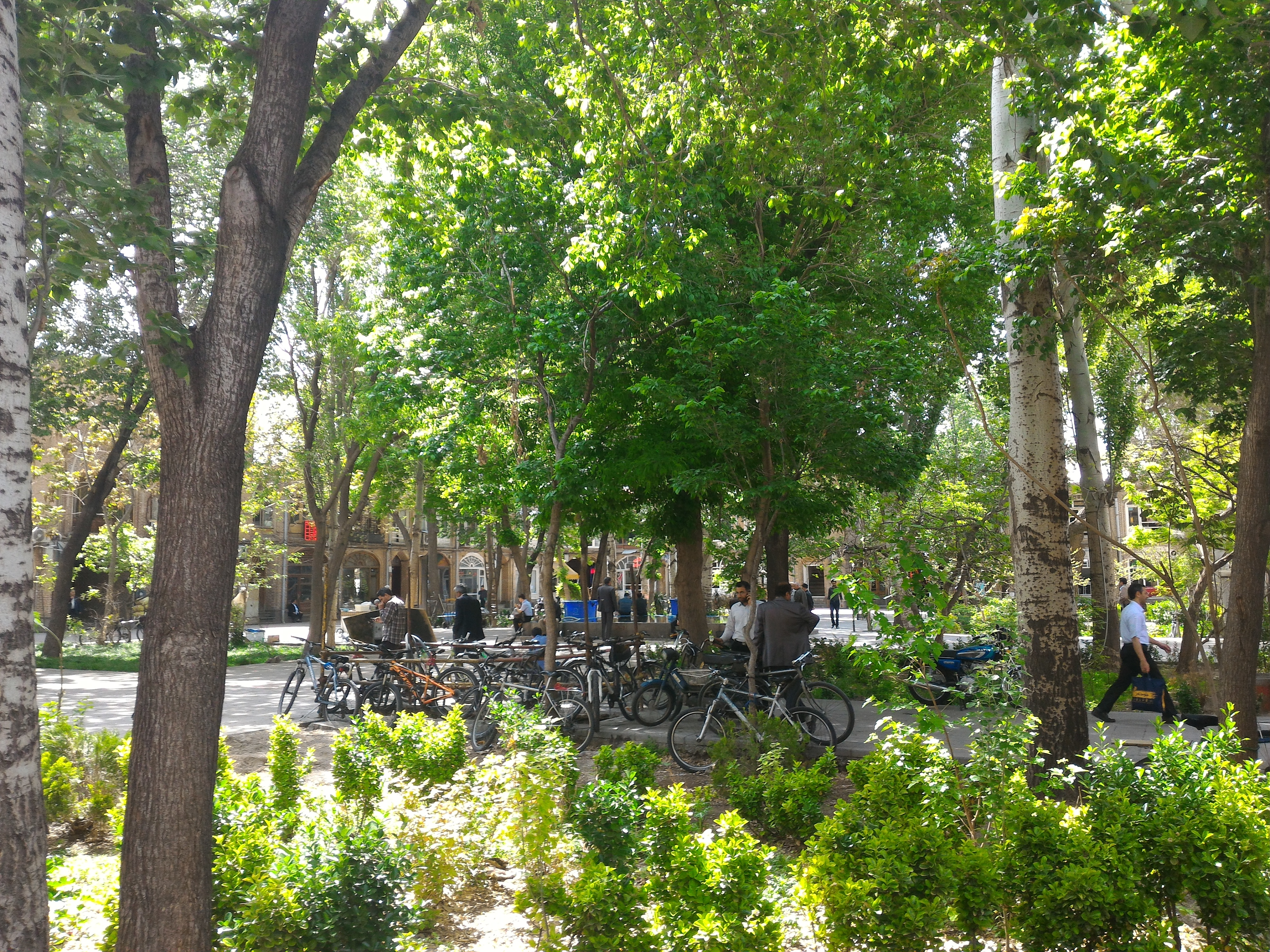
َCaravanserai near Amir row.

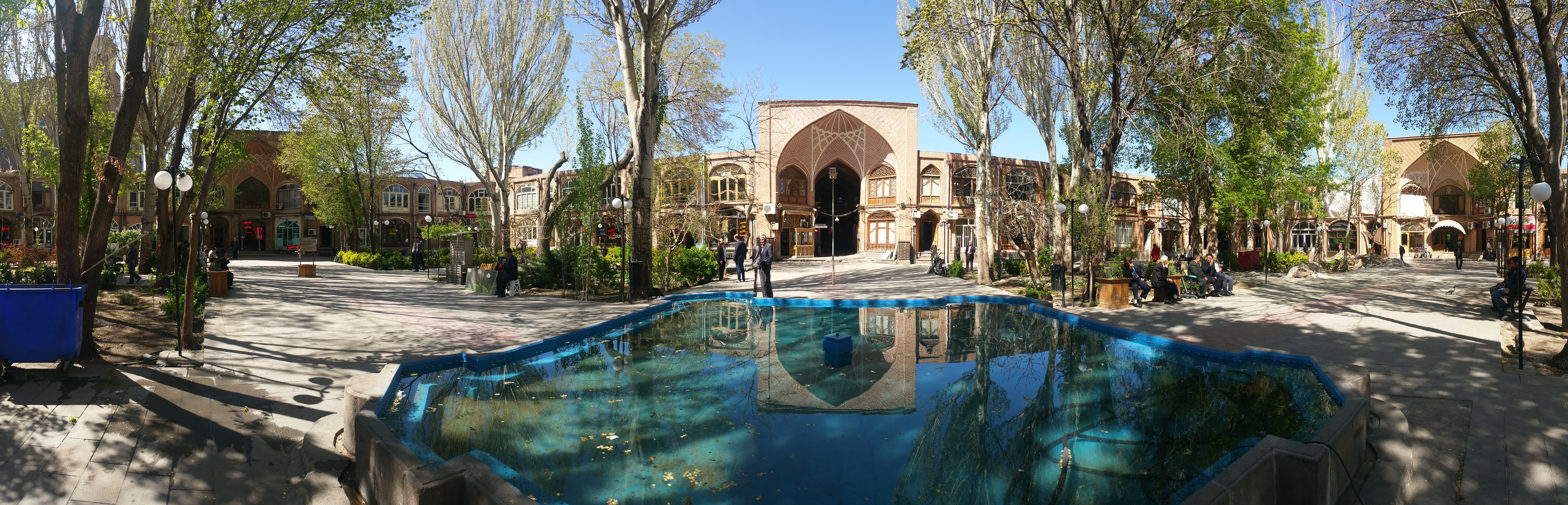
A caravanserai in the Bazaar of Tabriz.

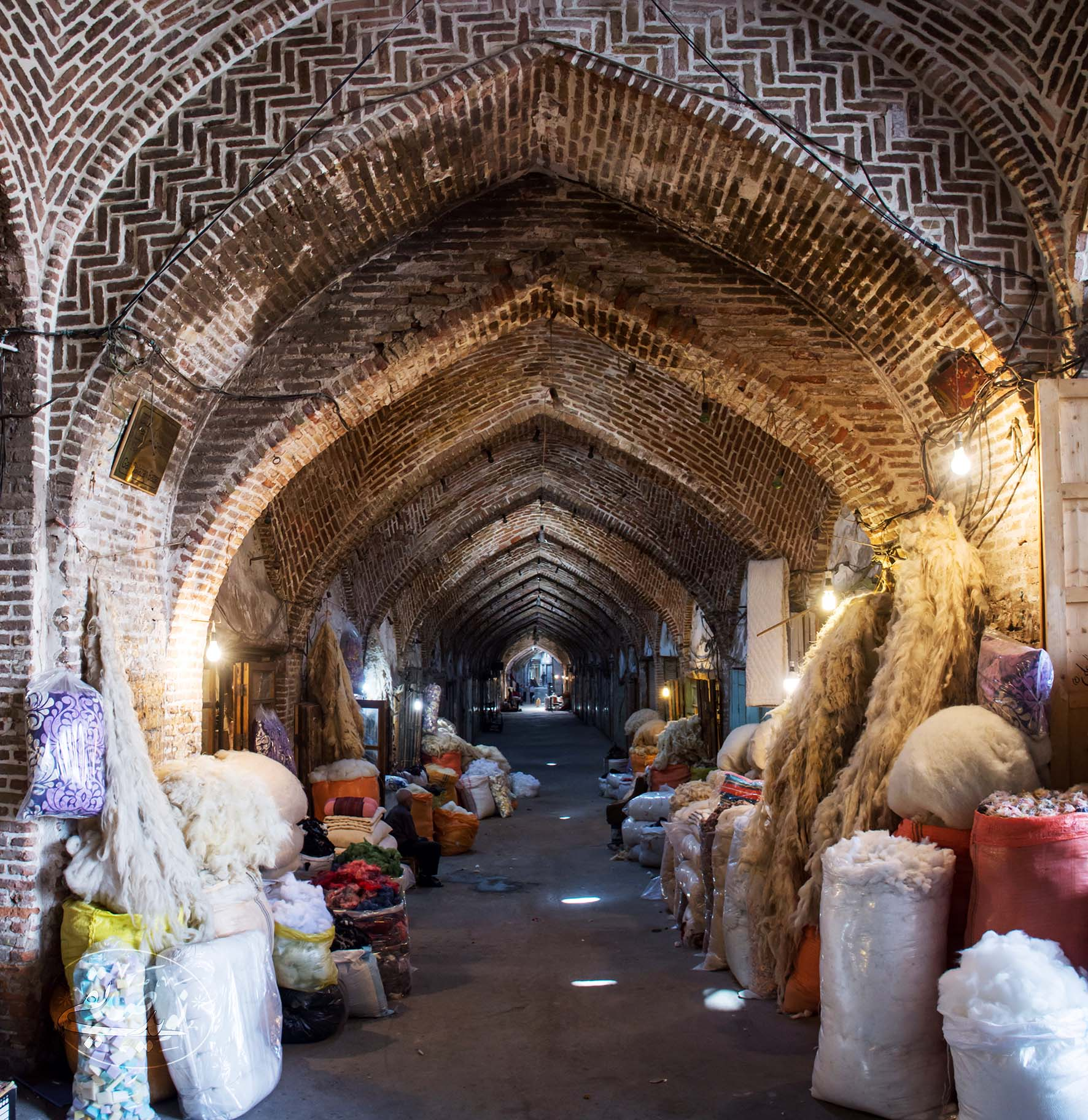
Gan Bazaar, translates to wider bazaar, a row in Tabriz Grand Bazaar.

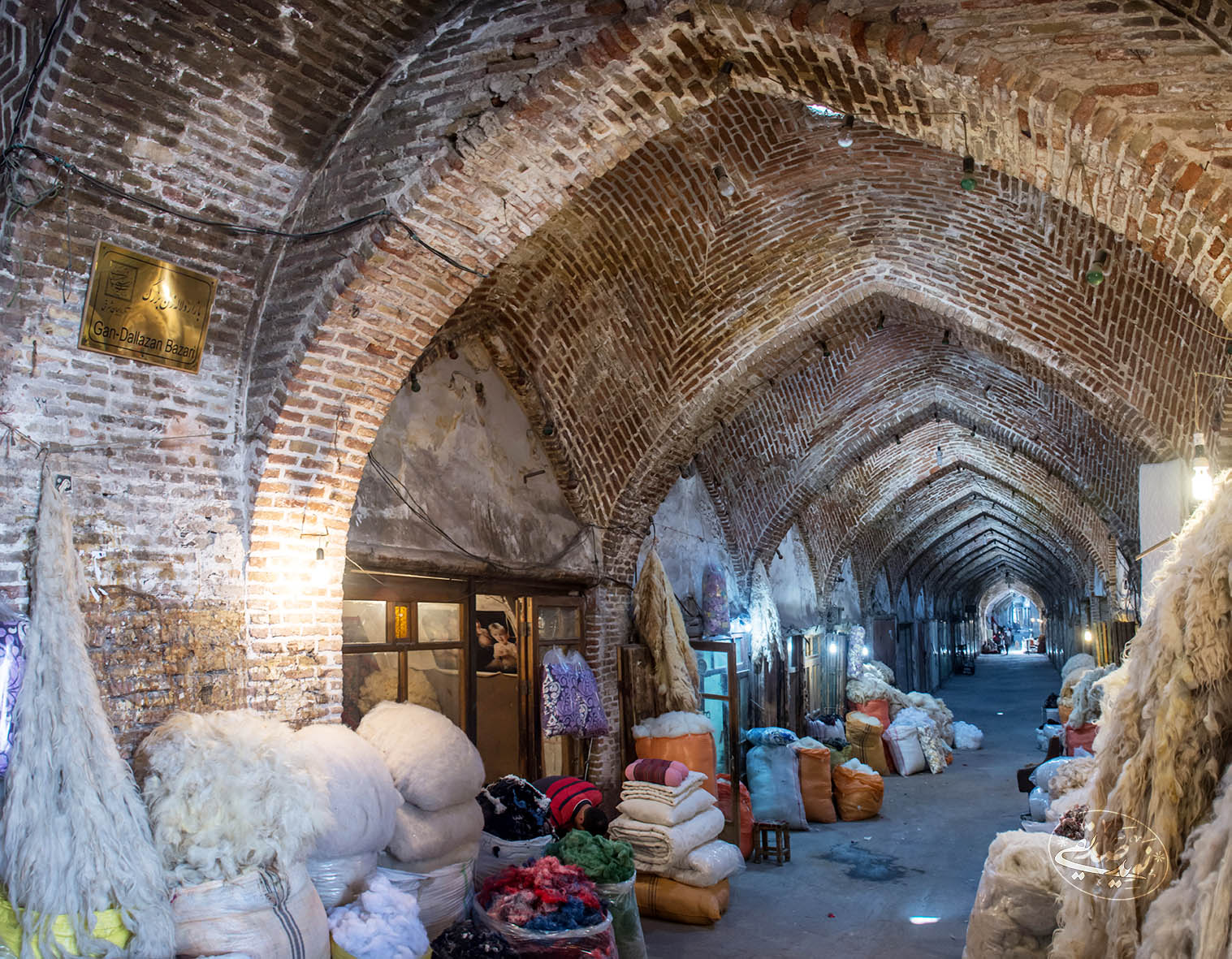
Gan Bazaar, a row in Tabriz Grand Bazaar.

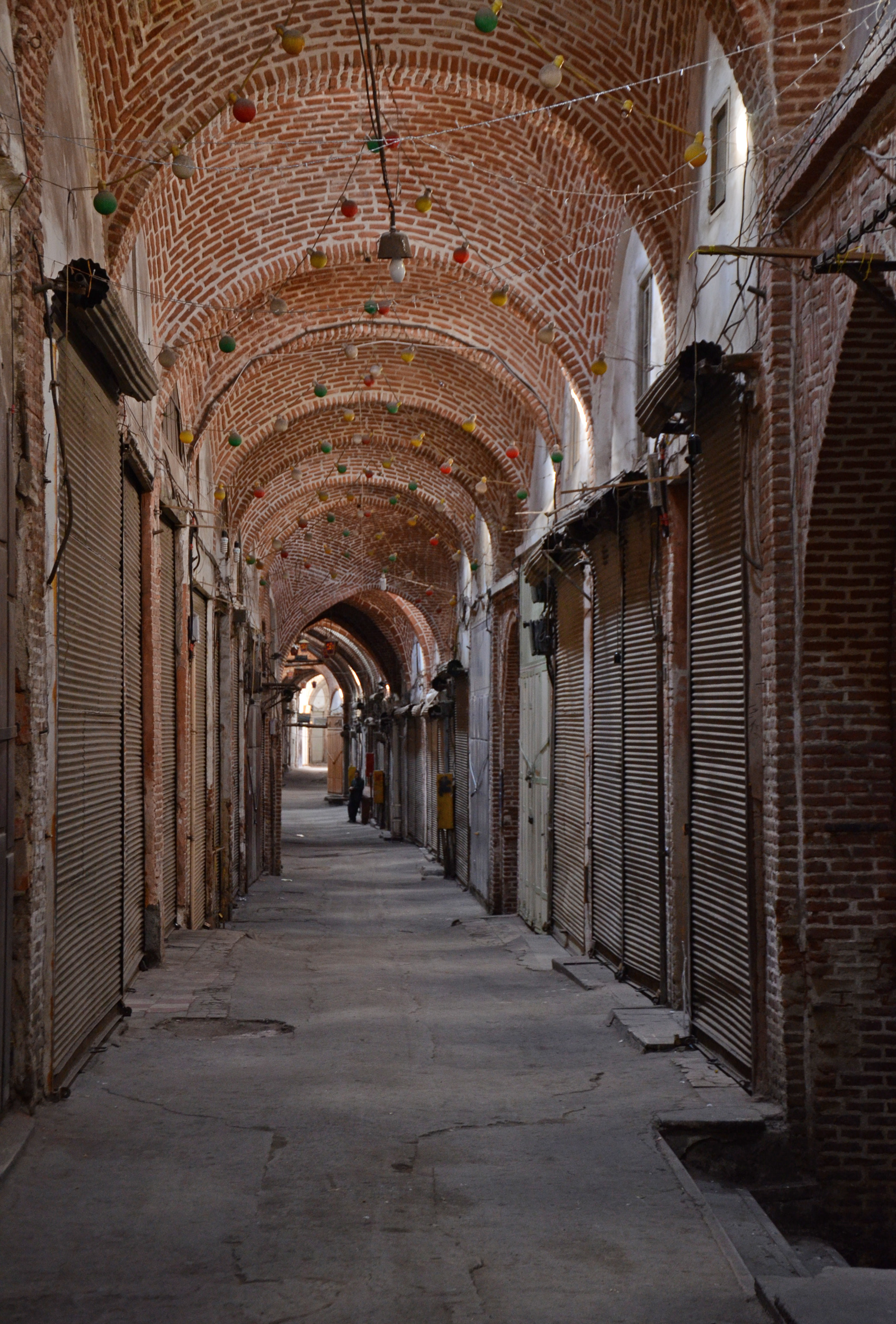

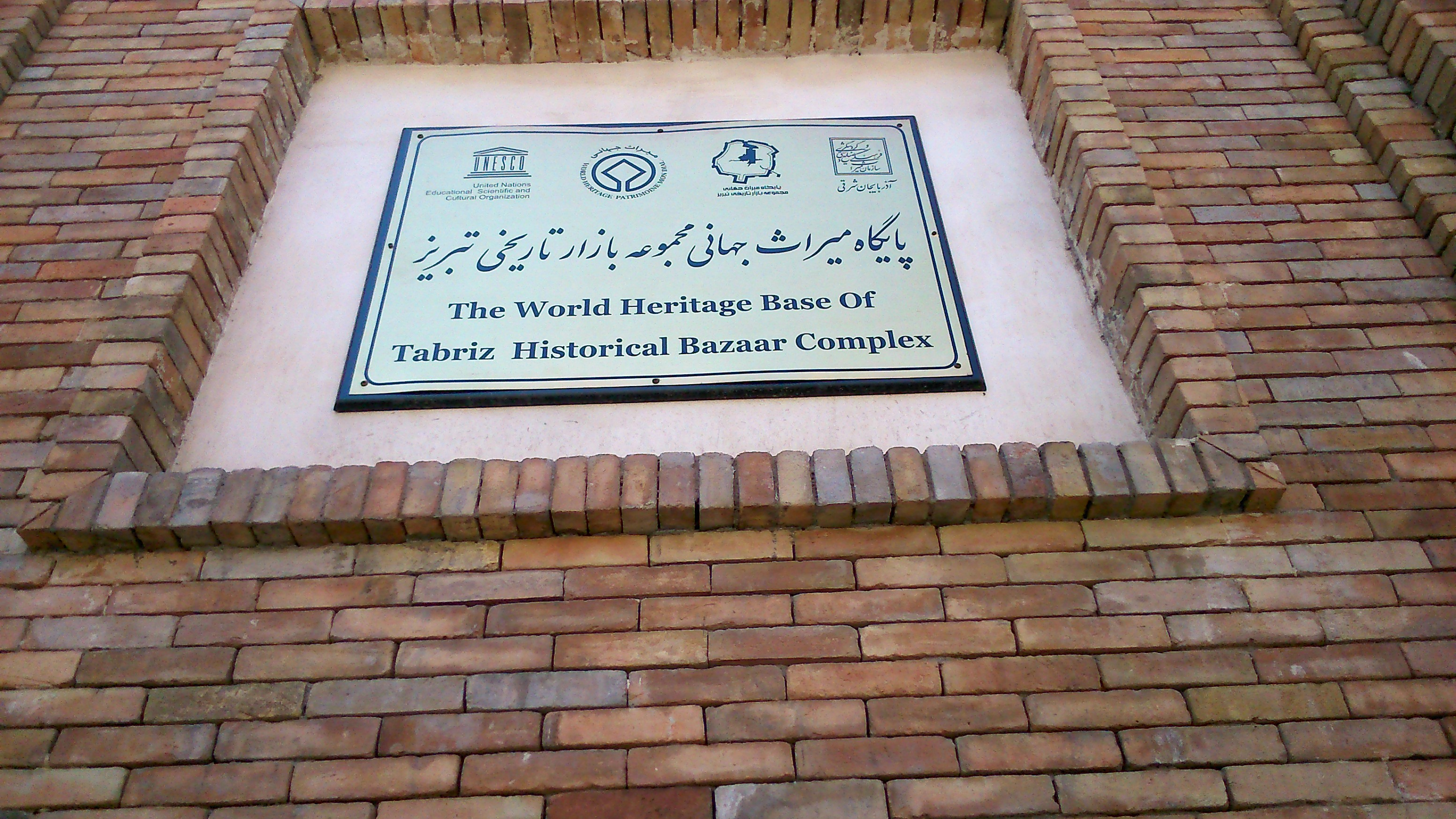

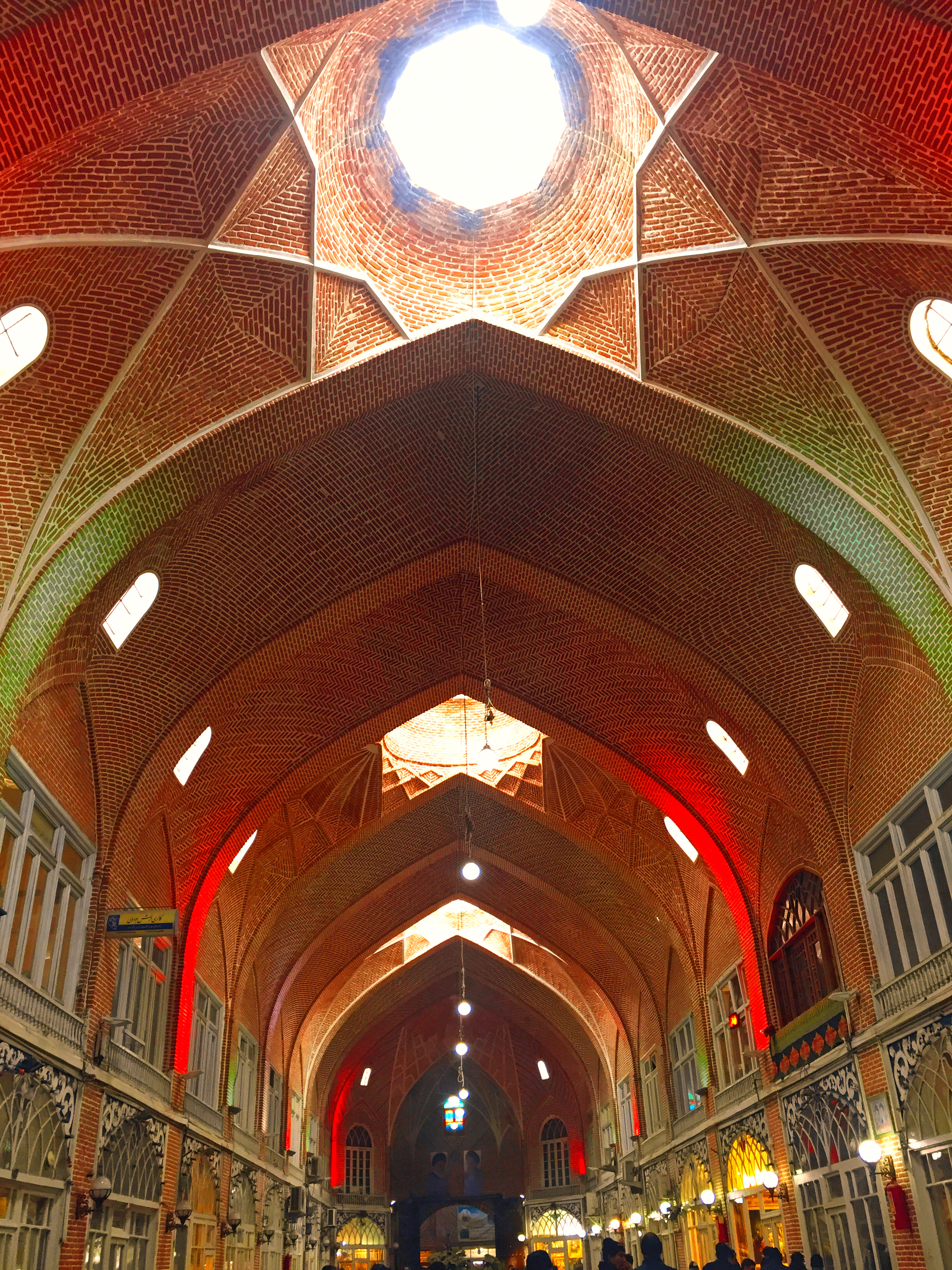

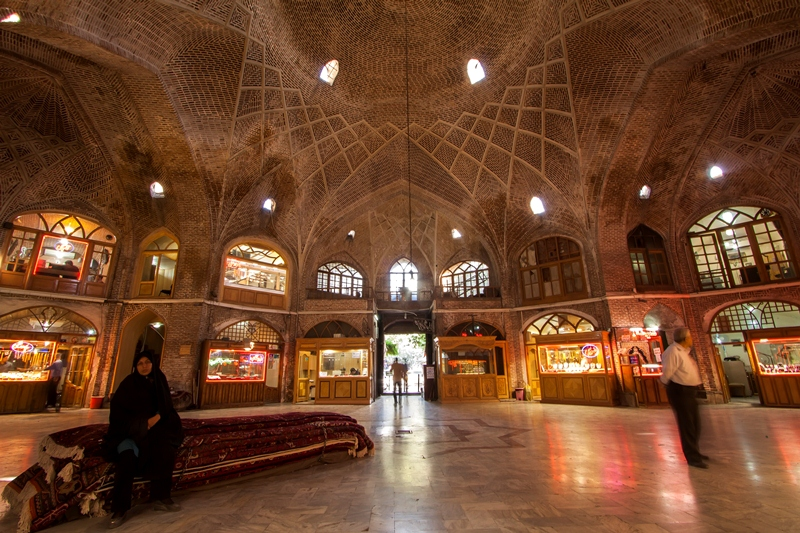

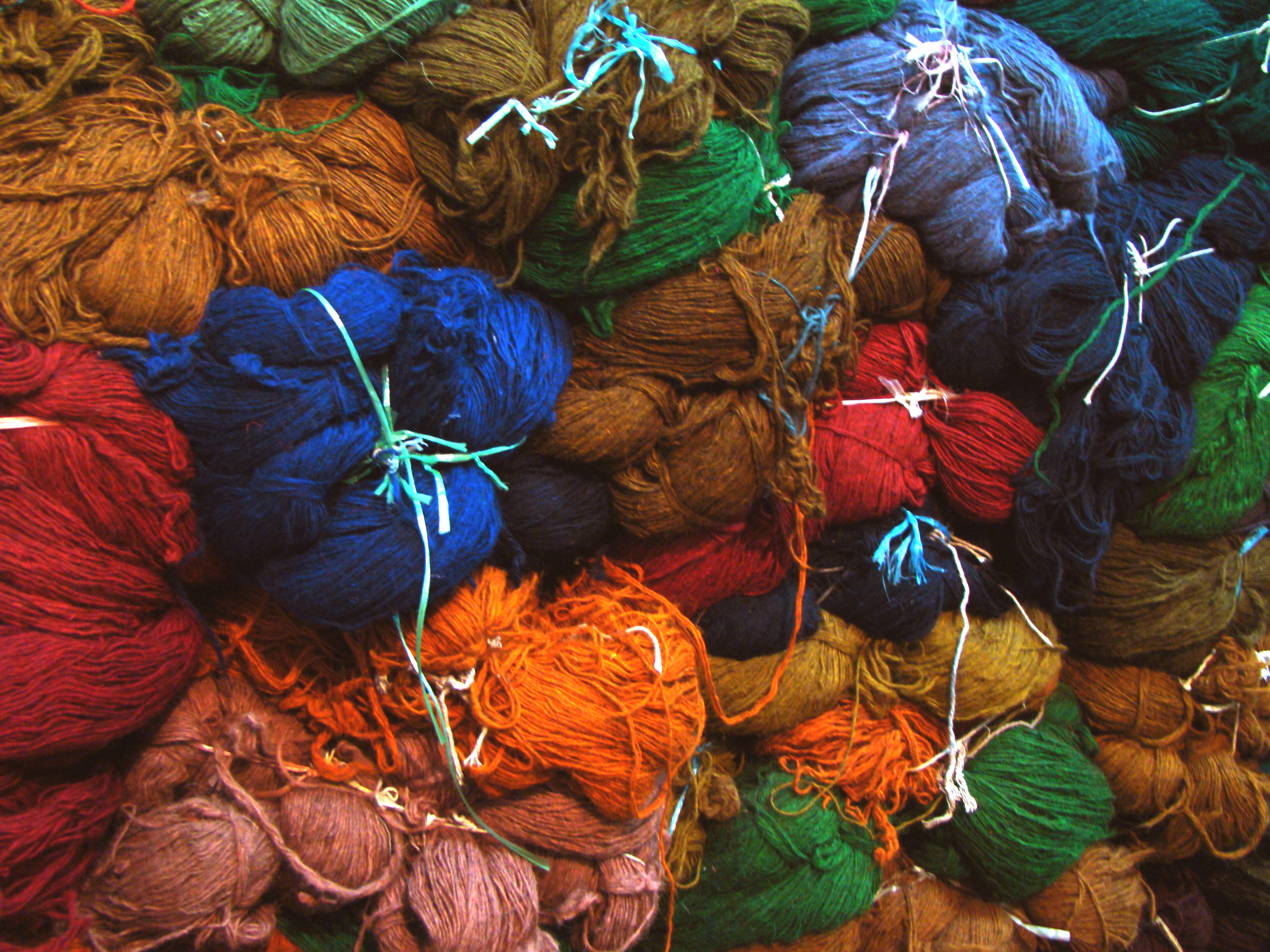

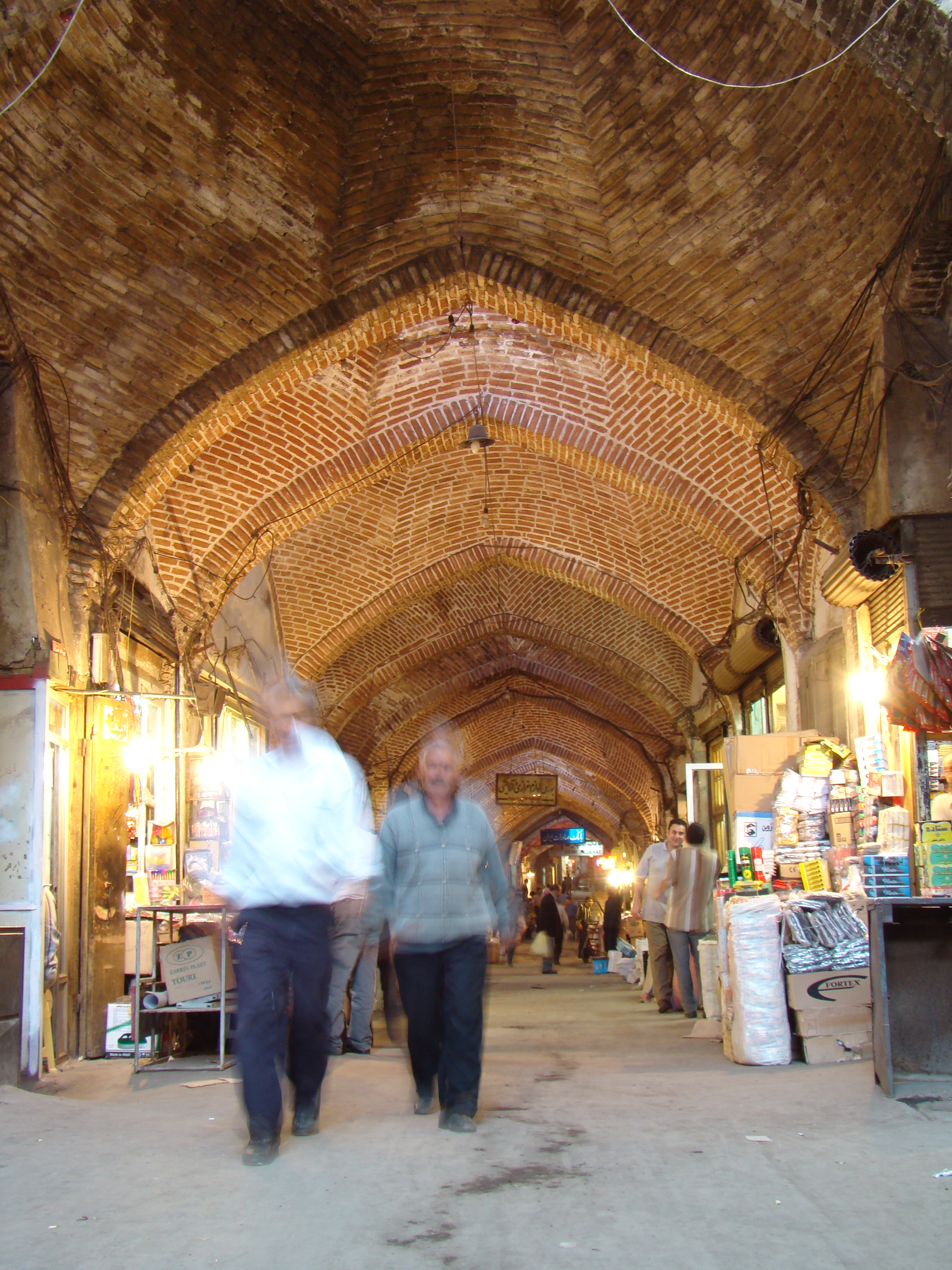

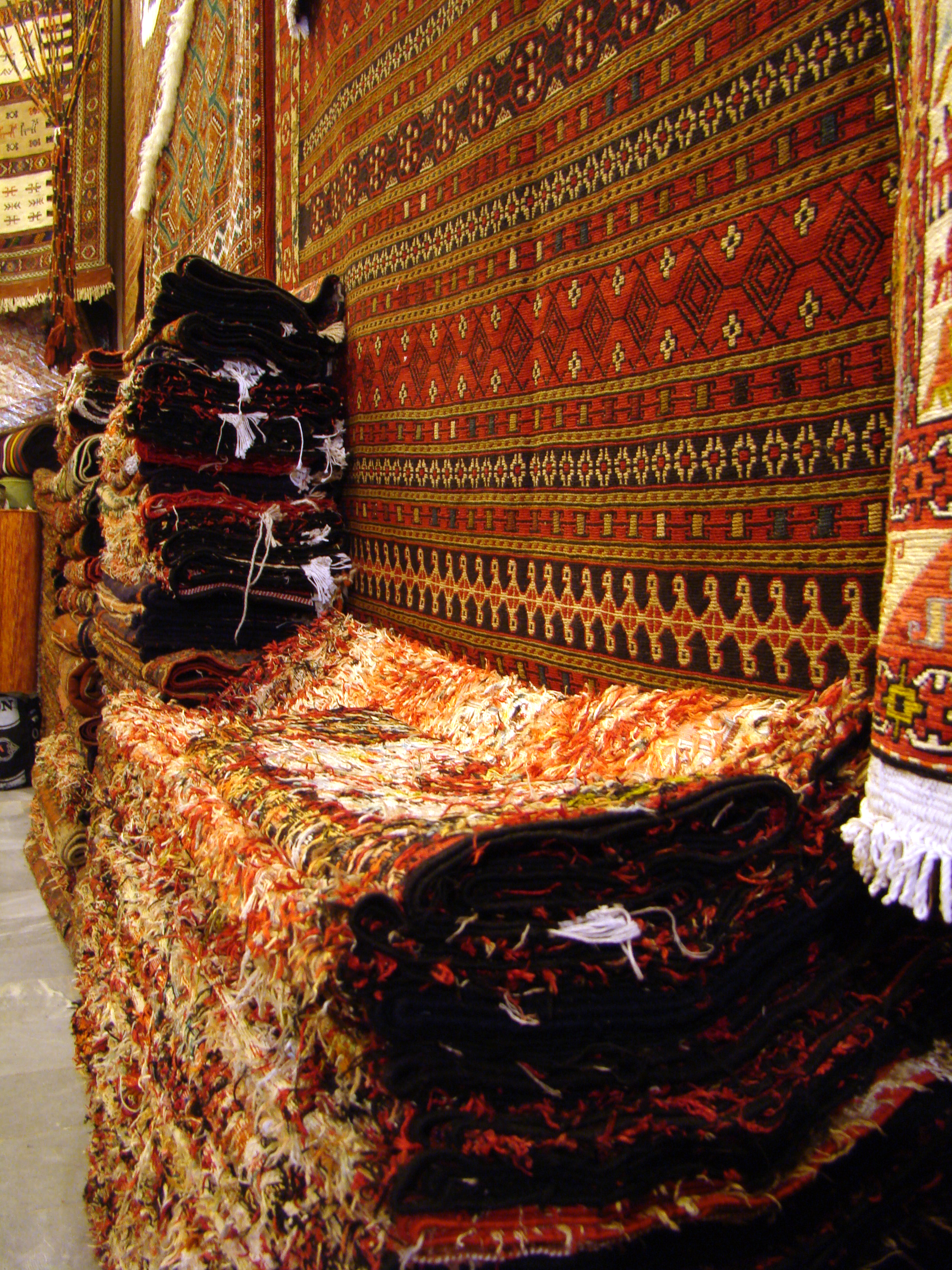

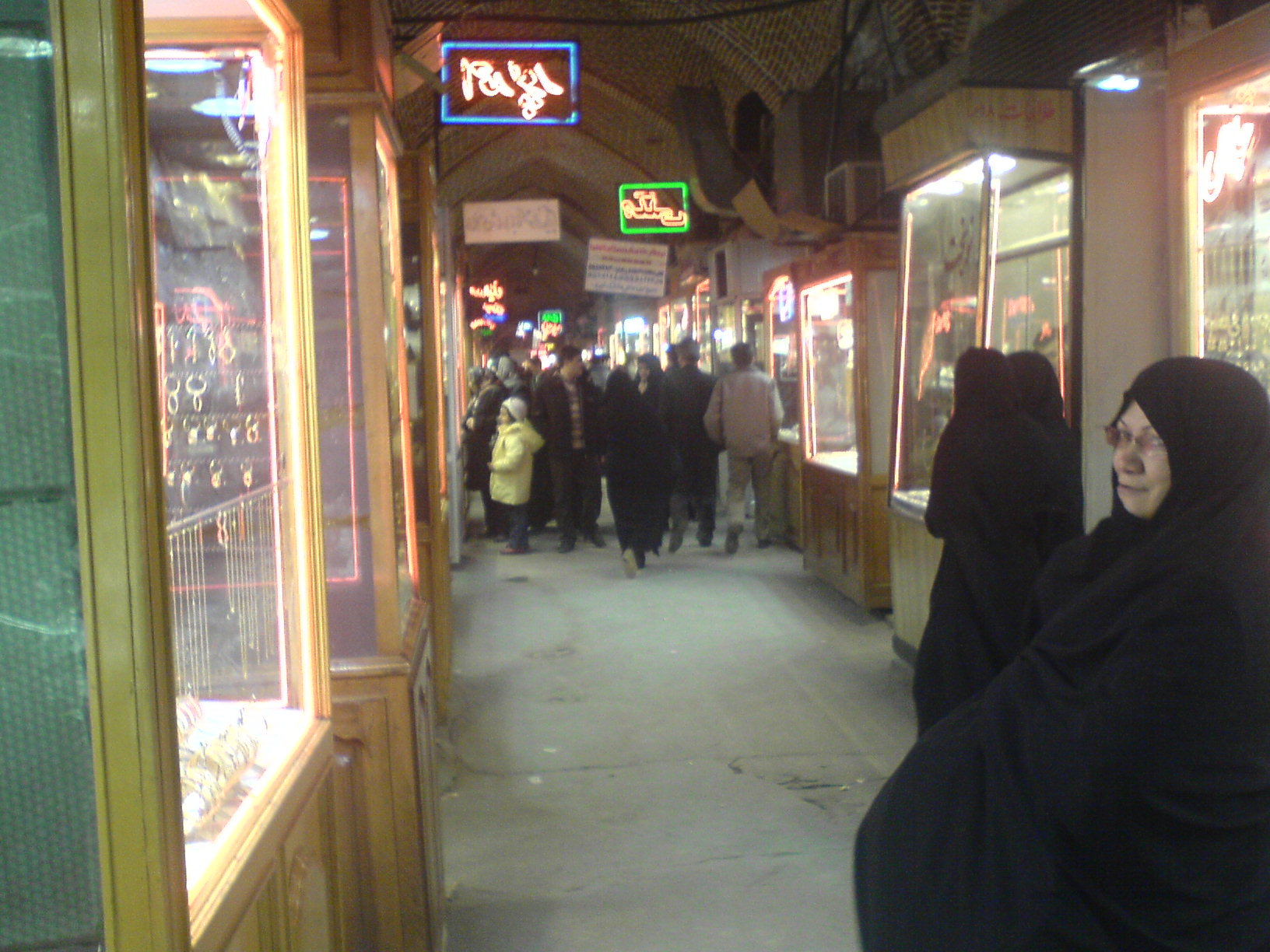

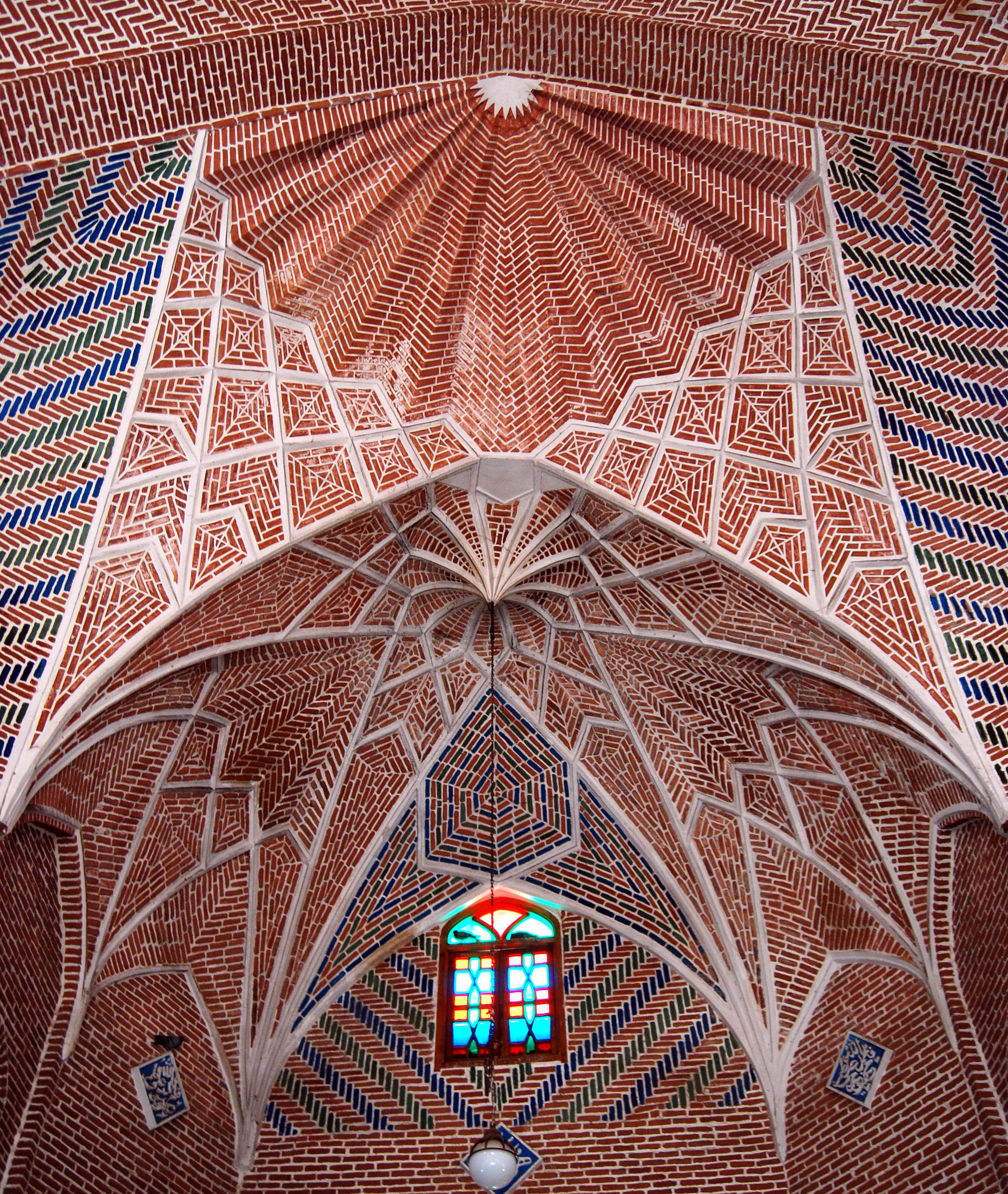

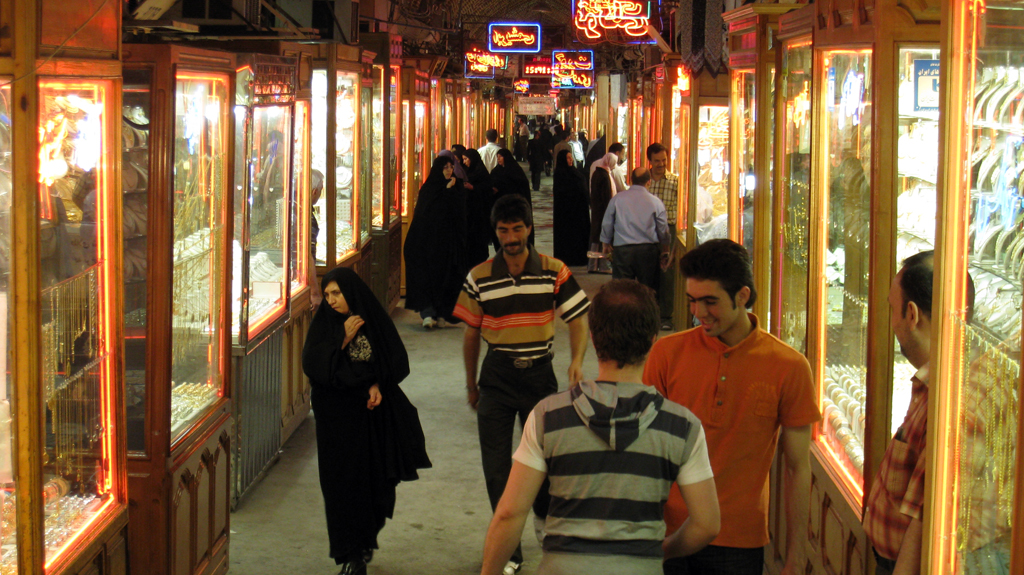

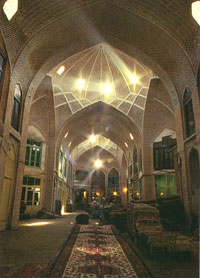

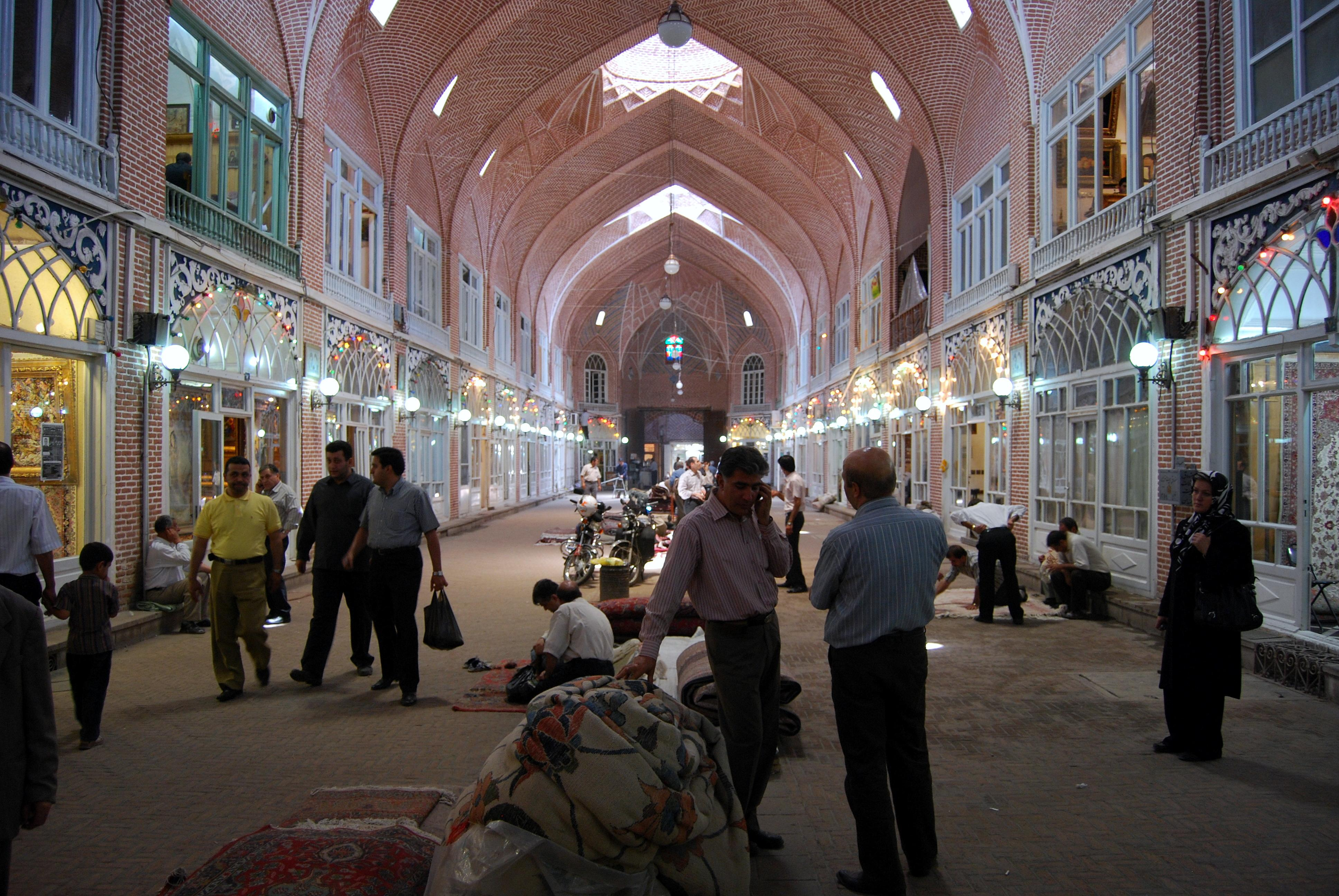

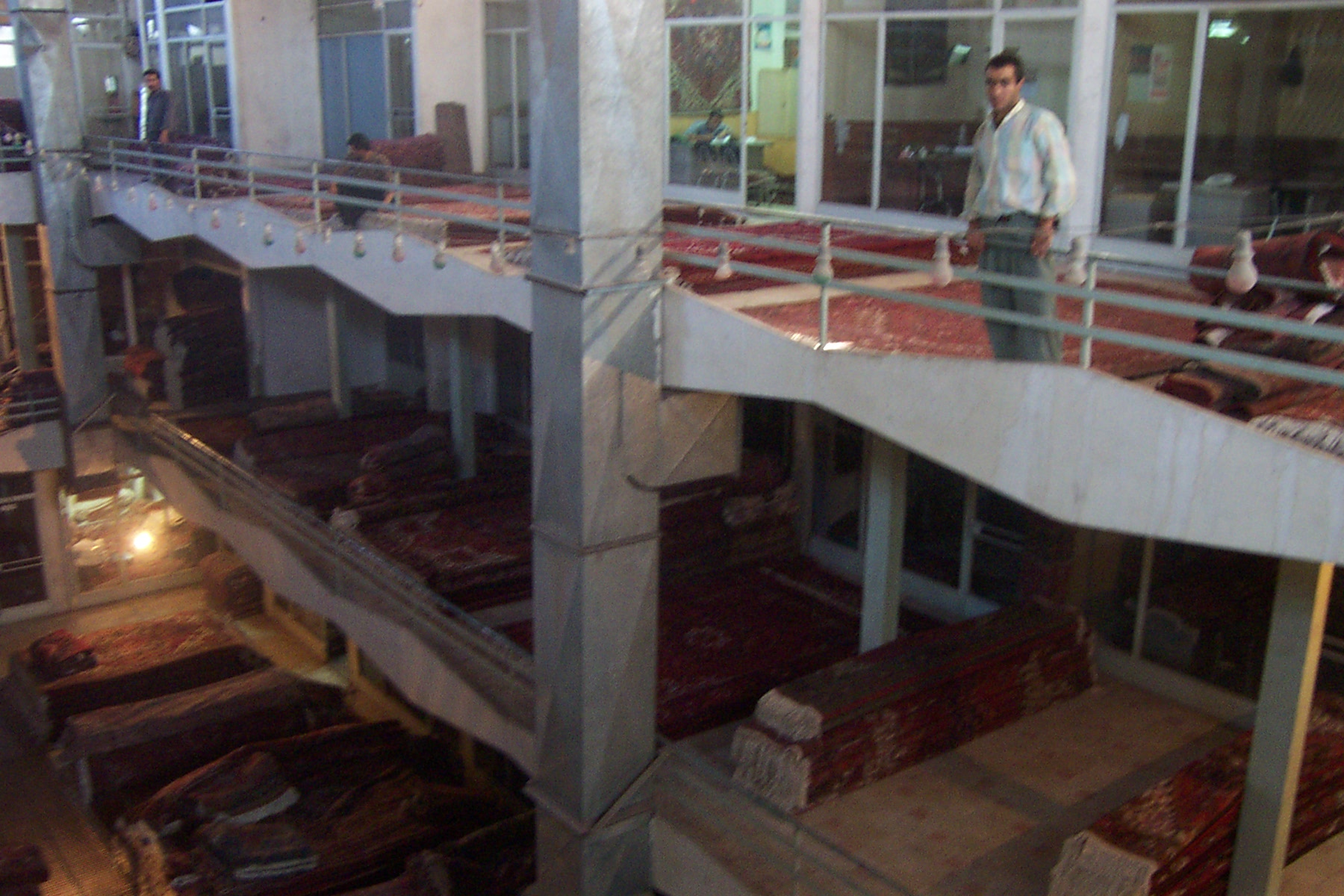

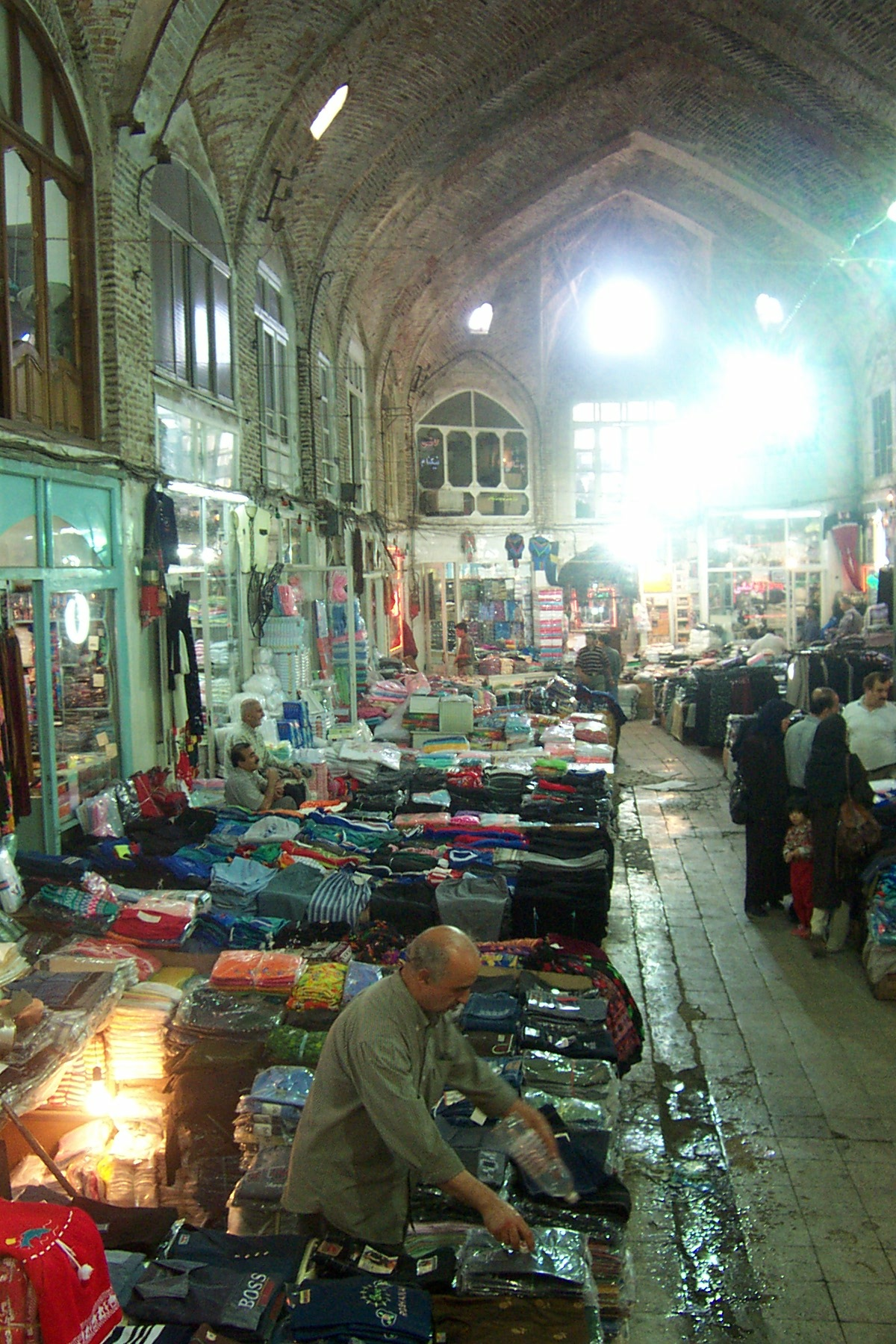

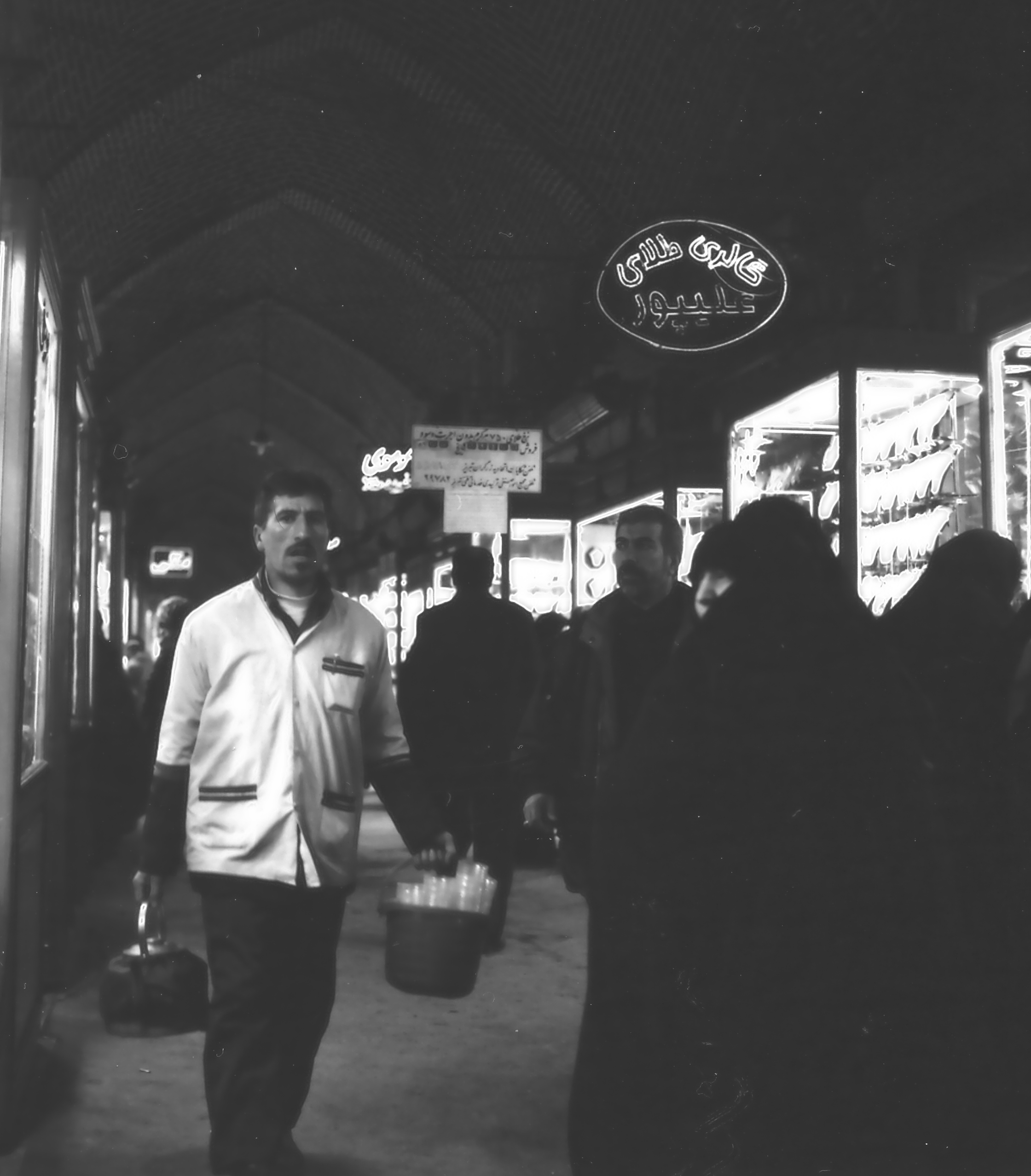

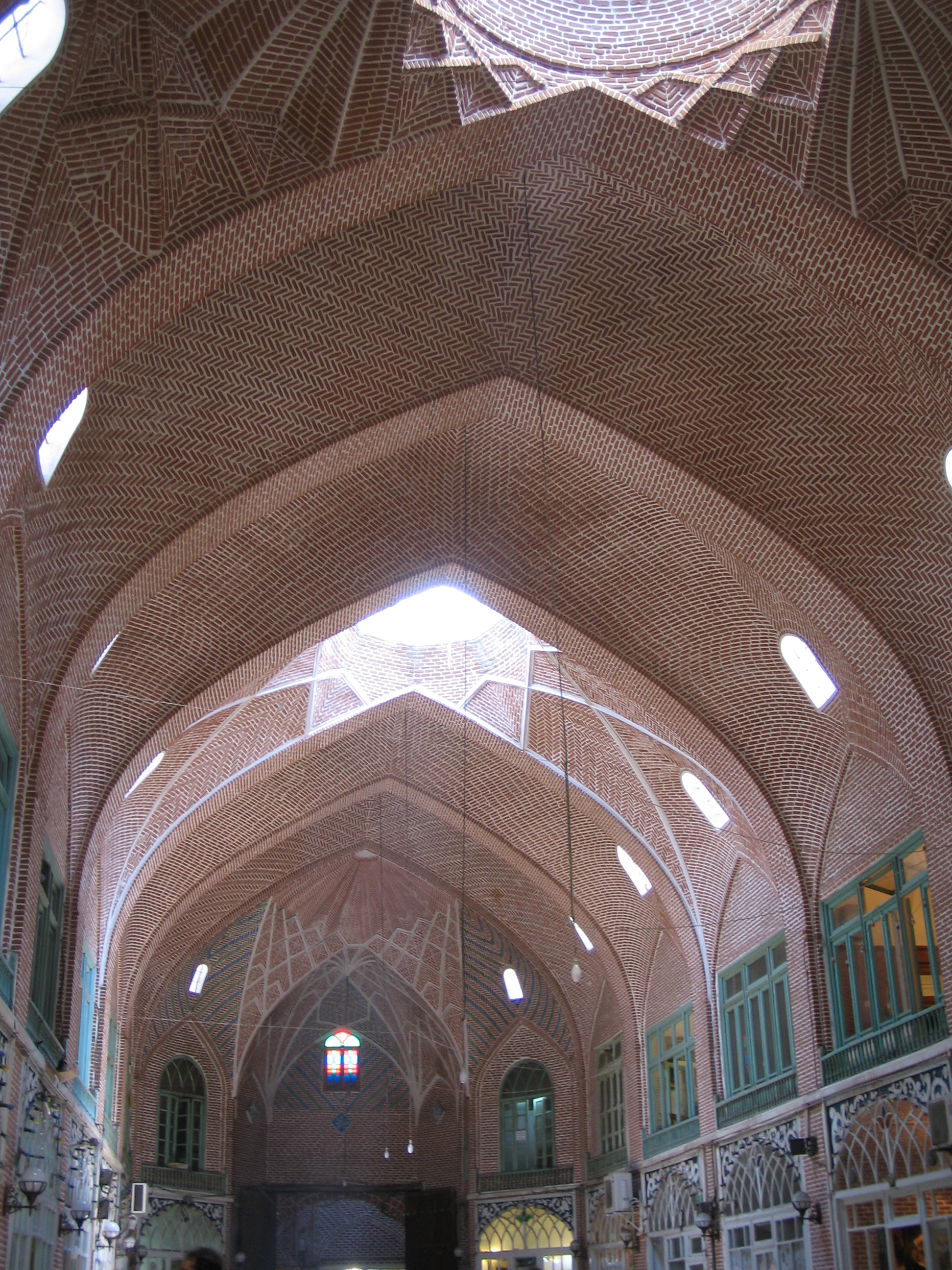

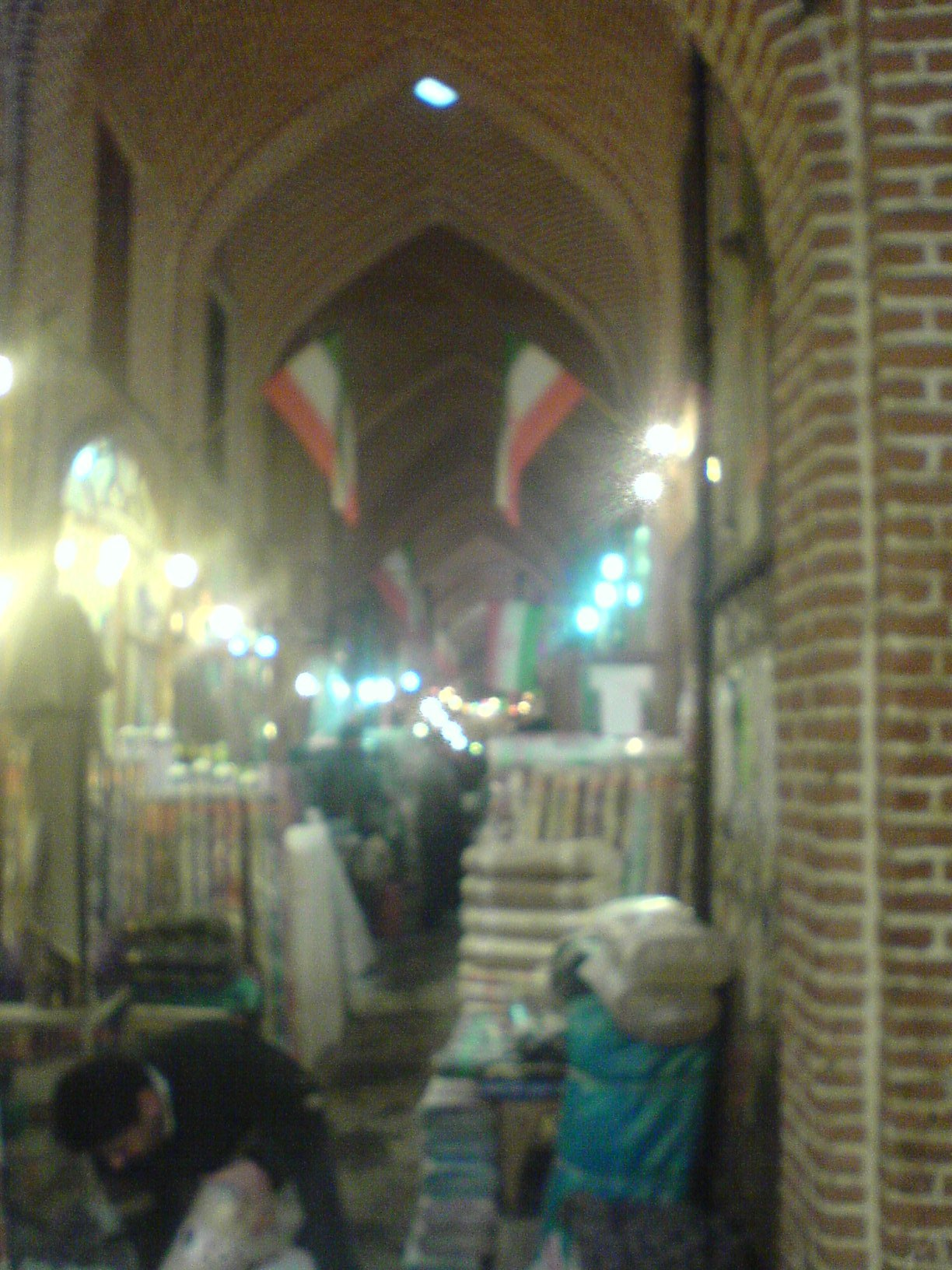

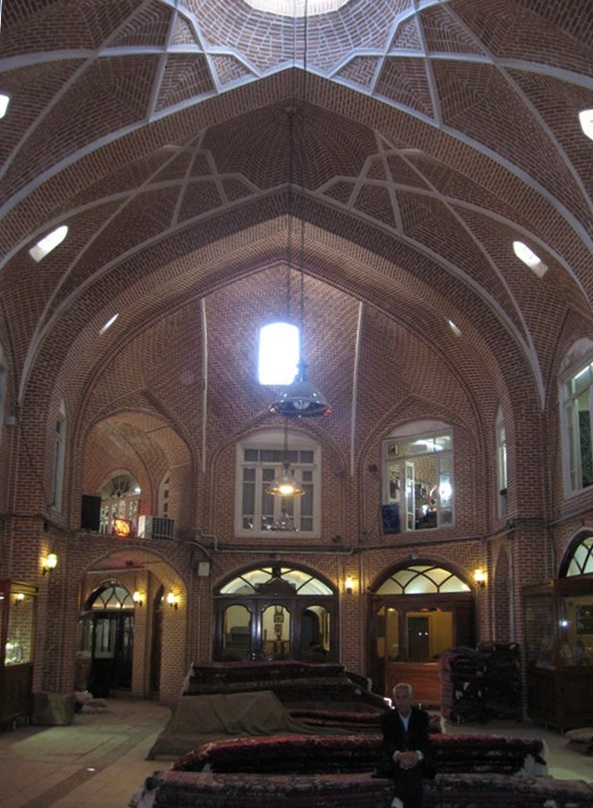

== See also ==
- Arabber
- Bazaar
- Blue Mosque, Tabriz
- Constitutional Revolution House of Tabriz
- Hawker centre (Asia) a centre where street food is sold
- Jameh Mosque of Tabriz
- Market (place)
- Peddler
- Retail
- Street vendor
- Street food
