= Sharbatoghlu House =

Historic building in Tabriz, Iran

Coordinates: 38°05′03″N 46°17′58″E

Sharbatoghlu House (Persian: خانه شربت اوغلی) is a historic building constructed during the Qajar era in Tabriz, Iran. It is located in the Sarkhab neighbourhood, near the Sarkhab Gate, in the area currently known as the Tabriz Cultural House. This structure was officially inscribed on Iran National Heritage List on 25 February 2001, under registration number 3222.

The house was originally commissioned by a carpet merchant for personal use during the second half of the Qajar era. A garden was added to the property during the Pahlavi era. In 1990, the building was purchased by the Municipality of Tabriz and subsequently restored for use as the Tabriz Cultural Center. At present, it hosts the East Azerbaijan branch of the Iranology Foundation.

== Architectural features ==
Located in the Sarkhab neighbourhood, the building covers a total area of 1,500 square meters, with a built-up area of 1,300 square meters. It comprises three stories and features two courtyards—one to the north and another to the south. The northern courtyard is situated below street level. The main entrance, located on the north side, leads directly into the northern courtyard, from which a set of stairs provides access to the ground floor.

The southern courtyard, originally covered, connects to the southern street through a brick-vaulted corridor. This corridor links several houses and terminates in an arched entrance adorned with a specially decorated brick portal. The central section of the house consists of three floors. The ground floor contains several interconnected rooms, while the basement—featuring vaulted ceilings—comprises a series of interconnected corridors and can be accessed from the northern courtyard via two staircases. A central staircase links the ground floor with the first floor, at the center of which is a large hall.

The northern façade is ornamented with decorative brickwork. The southern façade is distinguished by twelve wooden columns topped with plaster capitals. On the eastern side of the southern courtyard are arched brick elements, while the western side features a two-story building. The central staircase descends to the ground level, where two interconnected rooms are situated on either side. The lower floor of this section also consists of arched ceilings and multiple interconnected rooms. The entire structure was constructed in the late Qajar era.

== See also ==
- Constitution House of Tabriz
- Amir Nezam House
- Azerbaijan Museum

== Sources ==
- Kīnežād and Šīrāzī, Moḥammad-ʿAlī Kīnežād va Reżā Šīrāzī (1389), Ḵāneh-hā-ye qadīmī-ye Tabrīz, Našr-e Farhangestān-e Honar, ISBN 978-964-232-036-3
