= Constitution House of Tabriz =

Historic structure in Tabriz, Iran

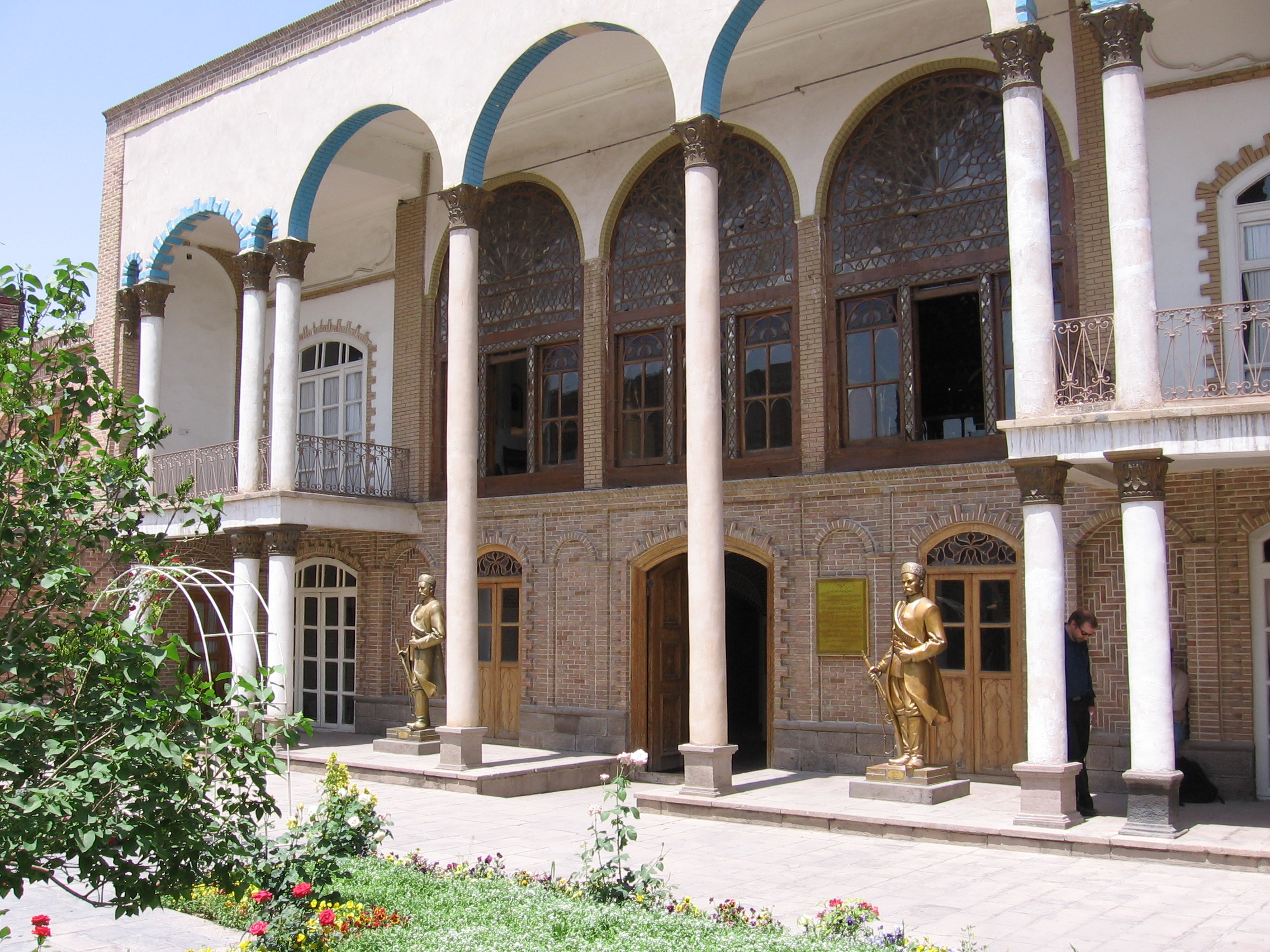
- Interactive map of the Constitution House of Tabriz area

General information
- Location: Tabriz, Iran
- Completed: 1868

The Constitution House of Tabriz (Persian: خانه مشروطه تبریز, romanized: Khaneh Mashrouteh Tabriz) is a historic Qajar era house located next to the Bazaar of Tabriz, on Motahari Ave in Tabriz, East Azerbaijan province, Iran.

During and following the years which led to the Constitutional Revolution, the house was used as a gathering place for the leaders, activists and sympathisers of the movement. Among them, the most famous were Sattar Khan, Bagher Khan, Seqat-ol-Eslam Tabrizi and Haji Mirza Aqa Farshi and the founder Haji Mehdi Kuzeh Kanani, himself a revolutionary activist and a well-reputed person of the time; who was named Abolmele, i.e. the father of the nation at the time. The two-story building was constructed in 1868 by Haj Vali Me'mar-e Tabrizi.

== History ==
The house was constructed by the order of Haj Mehdi Koozekonani in 1868. It includes a two-floor building with internal and external areas in the Qajar style. Haj Mehdi Koozekonani was a merchant in the Bazaar of Tabriz. With initiating of Constitution revolution and rising up in Tabriz city, Haj Mehdi joined the revolution and became one of the major financier of the revolution. Simultaneously, he used the house as a place for the meetings of revolutionary leaders, and a place for publication of underground papers of the constitution movement. The house again became important in history just after World War II, when it was used a place for Azerbaijan's Democrat Party meeting center (1946–1947). In 1975, the house was registered by the Cultural Heritage of Iran.

== Museum contents ==
The first floor is an exhibition of sculptures of famous Iranian constitution revolutionaries and some of their personal belongings, including their weapons, underground published newspapers of the revolution, night letters, the printing machine which was used in the house to publish revolutionary papers, and numerous photos from the revolution.

== Location ==
The Constitutional House of Tabriz is located in Rasteh Koocheh Street.

== Photo gallery ==
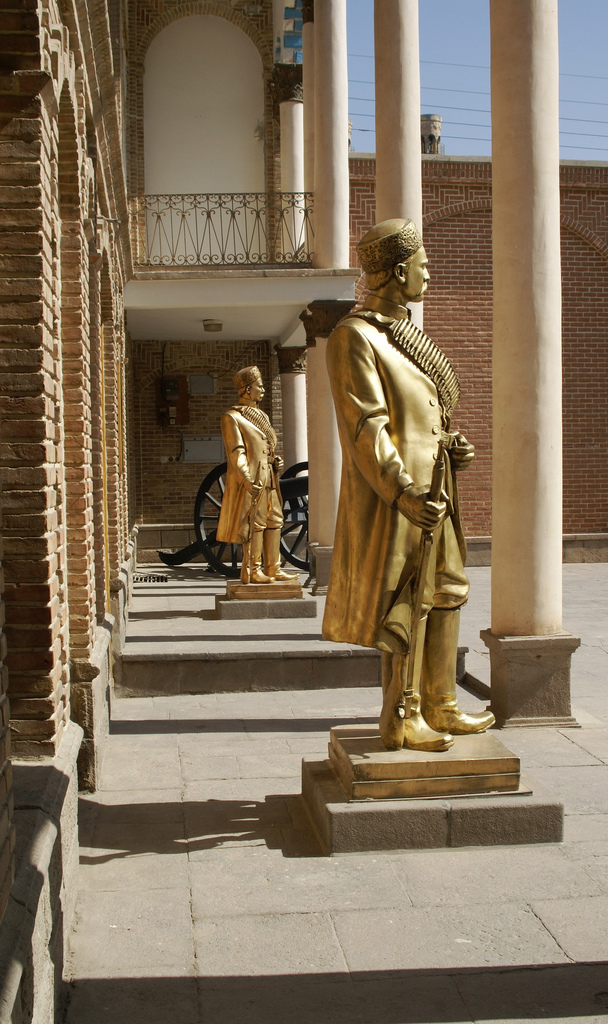
Constitutionalists

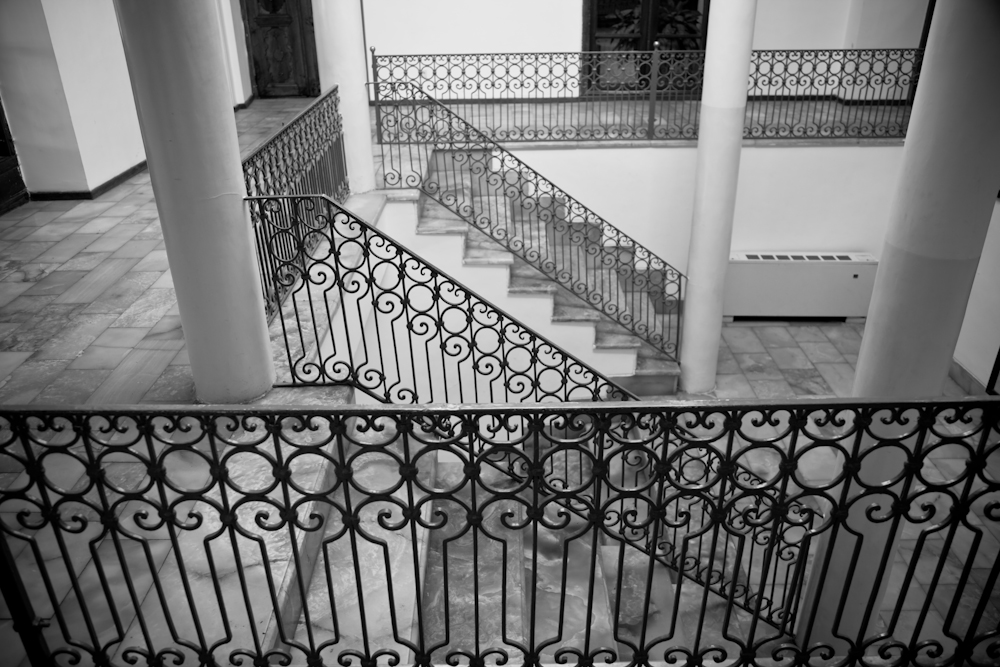
Stairway

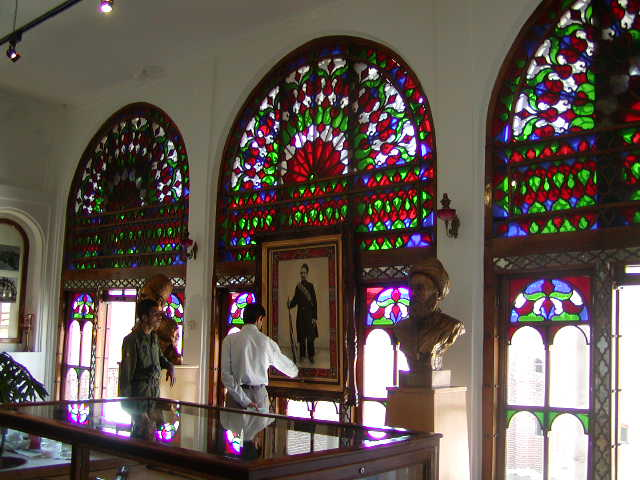
Exhibition room

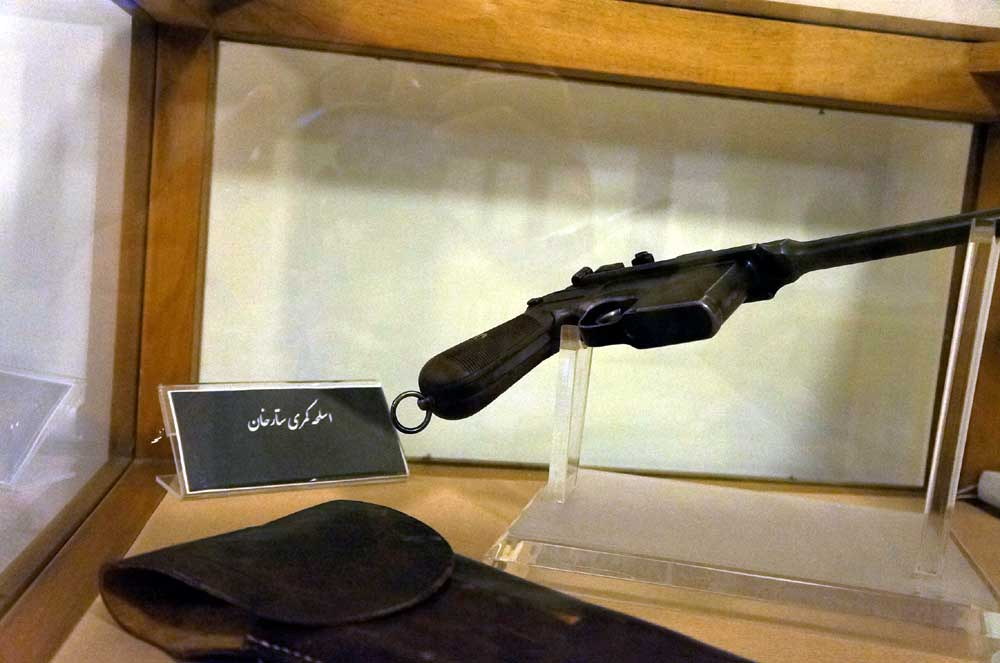

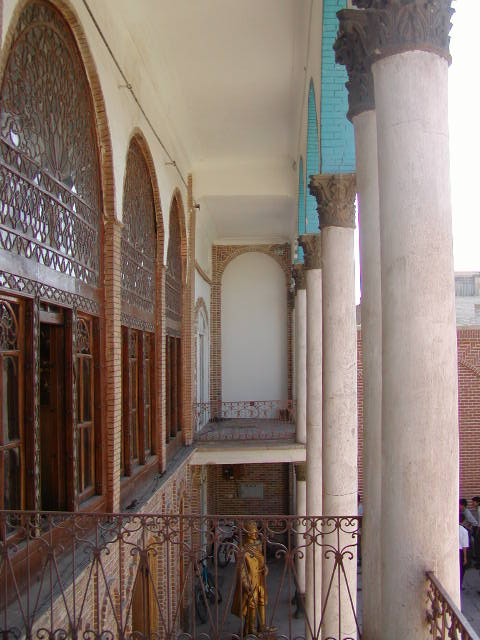

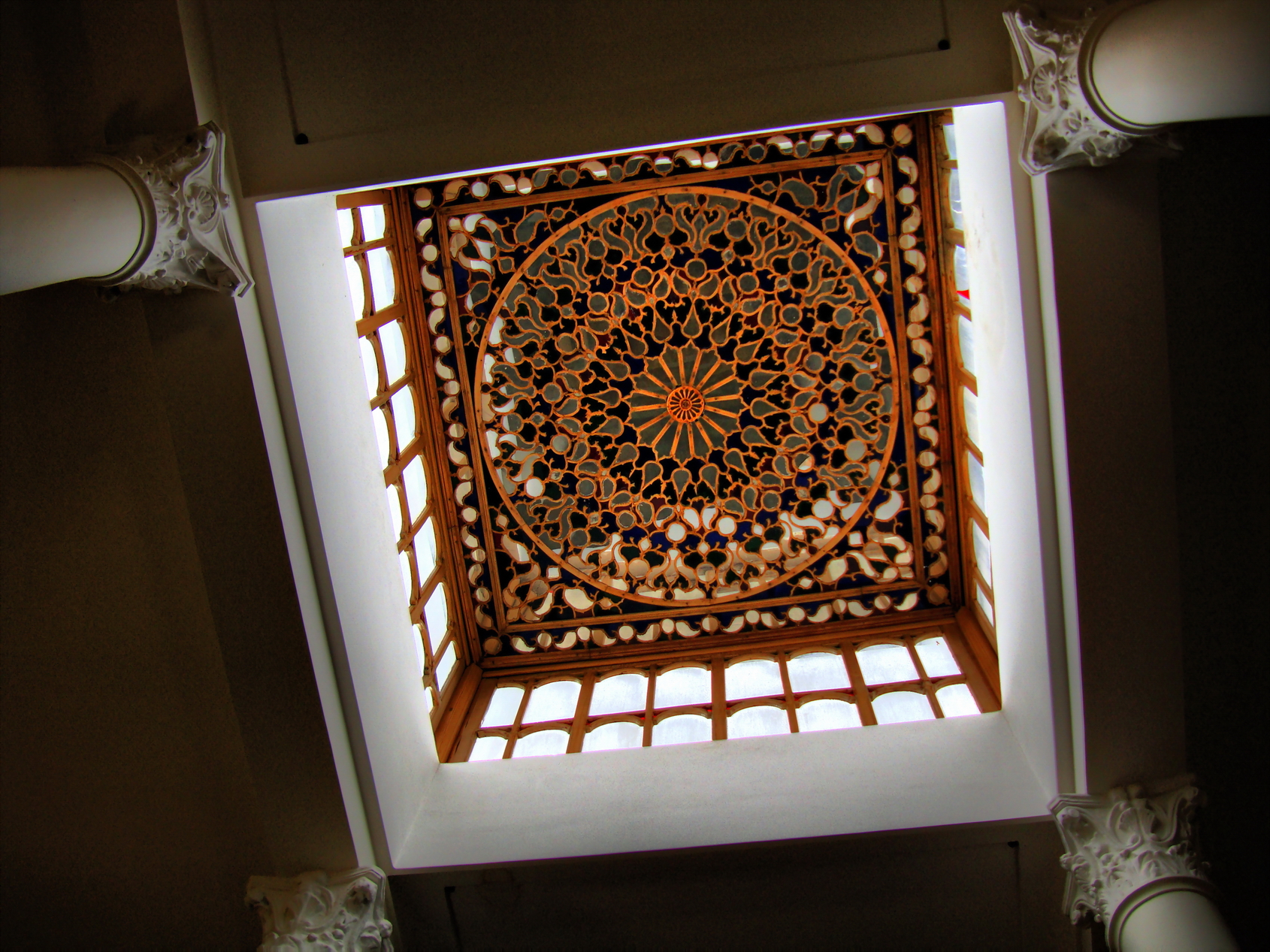

== See also ==
- Iranian Constitutional Revolution
- Tabriz
- Sharbatoghlu House
