= Shabestan =

Architectural element

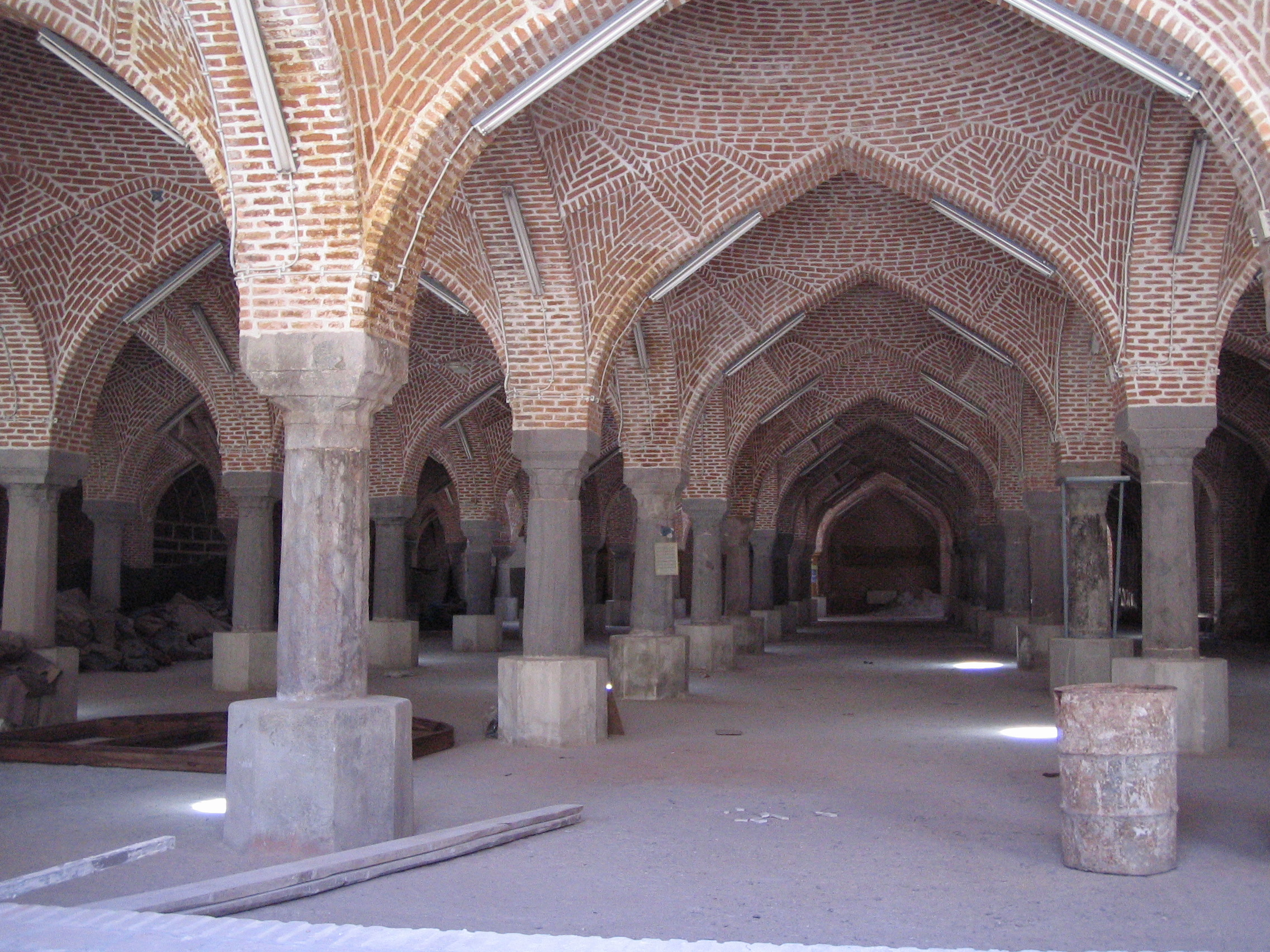
Shabestan of the Jameh Mosque of Tabriz; as Tabriz does not have a hot climate, the Shabestan here was not built underground.

A shabestan or shabistan (Persian: شبستان; Old Persian: *xšapastāna, lit. 'night room' is an underground space that can be usually found in traditional architecture of mosques, houses, and schools in ancient Iran.

These spaces were usually used during summers and could be ventilated by windcatchers and qanats.

During the Sasanian Empire and the subsequent Islamic periods, shabestan also referred to inner sanctums of the shahs where their concubines resided. Later these structures came to be called زنانه zanāneh "women's residence" and اندرونی andaruni "inner private zone".

== Cooling ==
Qanat and wind tower used for cooling

A shabestan can be cooled using a qanat in conjunction with a windcatcher. A windcatcher is a chimney-like structure positioned above the house; the one of its four openings opposite the wind direction is opened to move air out of the house. Incoming air is pulled from a qanat below the house. The air flow across the vertical shaft opening creates a lower pressure (see Bernoulli effect) and pulls cool air up from the qanat tunnel below the house. The air from the qanat was drawn into the tunnel at some distance away and is cooled both by contact with the cool tunnel walls/water and by the giving up of latent heat of evaporation as water evaporates into the air stream. In dry desert climates this can result in a greater than 15 °C (27 °F) reduction in the air temperature coming from the qanat. Windcatchers and qanat cooling have been used in desert climates for over 1000 years.

== See also ==
- Iranian architecture
