= Husseini =

Husseini (also spelled Hussaini Husaini, Hecini, Hosseini, Houssaini, Husayni or Husseiny, Arabic: حسیني) is an Arabic surname meaning 'of Hussein'. It usually refers to descent.

== Etymology ==
It is a nisba derivation of the given name Hussein or Husain from the name of Imam Husain ibn Ali. People with the surname El-Husseini, Al-Husseini, Al-Husaini or Husseini are descendants of the Islamic prophet Muhammad through the lineage of his grandson Imam Husain ibn Ali. Imam Husain ibn Ali was the son of Muhammad's daughter Fatima and Caliph Imam Ali ibn Abi Talib.

Husseinis are primarily found in the Arab world, Palestine, South Asia, Iran, Iraq, India, Afghanistan, and Gulf Countries. Because of their lineage, the Husseini family is considered one to be respected, honored and are given the title of Sayyid. This title represents a person who is a direct descendant of Muhammad and his grandson Husain ibn Ali.

== People ==
- Jalaluddin Surkh-Posh Bukhari Naqvi saint descendant from Ali Al Askar bin Imam Ali al-Hadi (10th shia Imam).
- Sayyid Ali Hosseini Khamenei, the supreme leader of Iran
- Abul Kalam Azad, Indian freedom fighter and 1st education minister
- Adem Hecini, Algerian athlete
- Abd al-Qadir al-Husayni, Palestinian Arab rebel commander (al-Husayni family)
- Adian Husaini, Indonesian Islamic scholar
- Ahad Hosseini, Iranian Azeri sculptor
- Arif Hussain Hussaini, Pakistani politician
- Faisal Husseini, Palestinian politician (al-Husayni family)
- Hind al-Husseini, Palestinian humanitarian (al-Husayni family)
- Homa Hosseini, Iranian rower
- Hossein Hosseini (born 1992), Iranian footballer
- Hussein el-Husseini, Lebanese statesman, former speaker of the Lebanese parliament
- Jalal Hosseini, Iranian footballer
- Kamil al-Husayni, Palestinian judge (al-Husayni family)
- Karim al-Hussayni, Imam of the Ismaili Muslims and the fourth Aga Khan
- Khaled Hosseini, American novelist and physician
- Majid Hosseini (born 1996), Iranian footballer
- Malek Hosseini (born 1968), an Iranian philosopher
- Mansoor Hosseini, Swedish composer
- Mansooreh Hosseini, Iranian contemporary artist
- Mehdi Hosseini, Persian composer
- Mohammed al-Husseini, Lebanese-Canadian member of Hezbollah
- Mohammad Amin al-Husayni, Palestinian Arab nationalist (al-Husayni family)
- Mohammad Hosseini, Iranian politician
- M. Yousuff Hussaini, American applied mathematician
- Nasrin Husseini, Afghani refugee advocate, veterinary researcher, and food activist
- Rana Husseini, Jordanian journalist
- Saeed al-Husayni, Wazir of Sylhet
- Shahab Hosseini, Iranian actor
- Shamseddin Hosseini, Iranian politician
- Syed Shah Mohammed Hussaini, Indian educationalist
- Seyyed Ali Hussaini Sistani, Iranian Shia Marja' in Iraq
- seyyed Ebrahim Raisi, Iranian politician
- seyyed Mirza Shirazi Iranian Shiite marja and Leader of Persian Tobacco Protests

== See also ==
- Hussein
- Hoseyni (disambiguation), various places in Iran
- Al-Husayni, Palestinian Arab clan
- Hussaini (Hunza), Valley in Pakistan
