= Hoseyni =

Hoseyni or Hoseini (Persian: حسيني), also rendered as Husaini or 'oseyni, may refer to various places in Iran:

- Hoseyni-ye Olya, East Azerbaijan Province
- Hoseyni, Isfahan
- Hoseyni, Khuzestan
- Hoseyni, Kurdistan
- Hoseyni, Nishapur, Razavi Khorasan Province
- Hoseyni, Taybad, Razavi Khorasan Province
- Hoseyni, Yazd
- Hoseyni Rural District, in Khuzestan Province

== See also ==
- al-Husayni family
- Husseini
