= Baghmisheh gate =

Gate in Tabriz, Iran

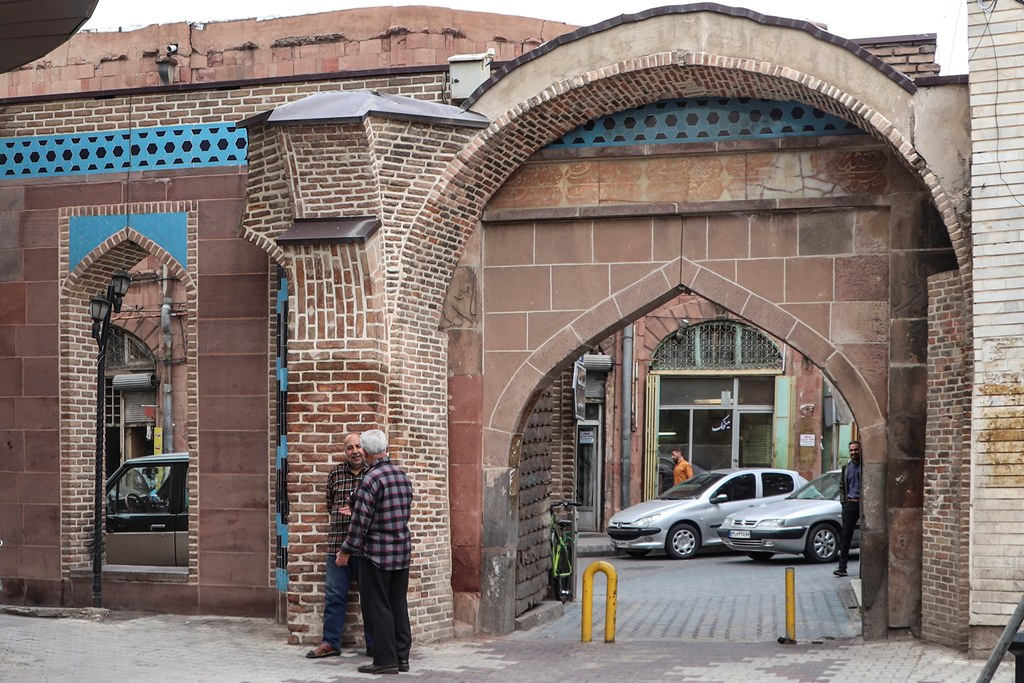
- Location: Iran
- Coordinates: 38°04′46″N 46°17′57″E
- Location of Baghmisheh gate

Baghmisheh gate (Persian: دروازهٔ باغمیشه, Azerbaijani: باغمشه قاپی سی), also transliterated as Baghmasha, is an old gate in the Bazaar of Tabriz, north-western Iran. It is located in Baghmisheh district, south of the Mehranrud River.

Until modern times, the city was protected by a defensive wall. There were eight gates on the city wall: Shotorban, Istanbul, Gajil, Mahadmahin, Nobar, Baghmisheh, Sorkhab, Khiyaban. Of these, just Baghmisha gate survives today.

== See also ==
- Baghmisheh
- Azarbaijan Museum
