= Baghmisheh =

Historic district of Tabriz, Iran

Coordinates: 38°04′N 46°20′E

Bāghmisheh or Bāghmasha (Azerbaijani: باغمشه) is one of the historic districts of Tabriz, Iran, located in the north-eastern part of the city.

== See also ==
- Baghmisheh gate
