= Iron Age museum =

Museum in Tabriz, Iran

The Iron Age museum (Persian: موزه عصر آهن) is a museum in Tabriz, Iran. Established in 2006, the museum is built over an iron age archaeological site. The burial site was uncovered in 1997 during the reconstruction of the nearby Blue Mosque. The Iron Age museum now contains exhibits, dig sites, and artifacts recovered from the site.

== See also ==
- Azerbaijan Museum
- Pottery Museum of Tabriz
