= Pottery Museum of Tabriz =

Art museum in Tabriz, Iran

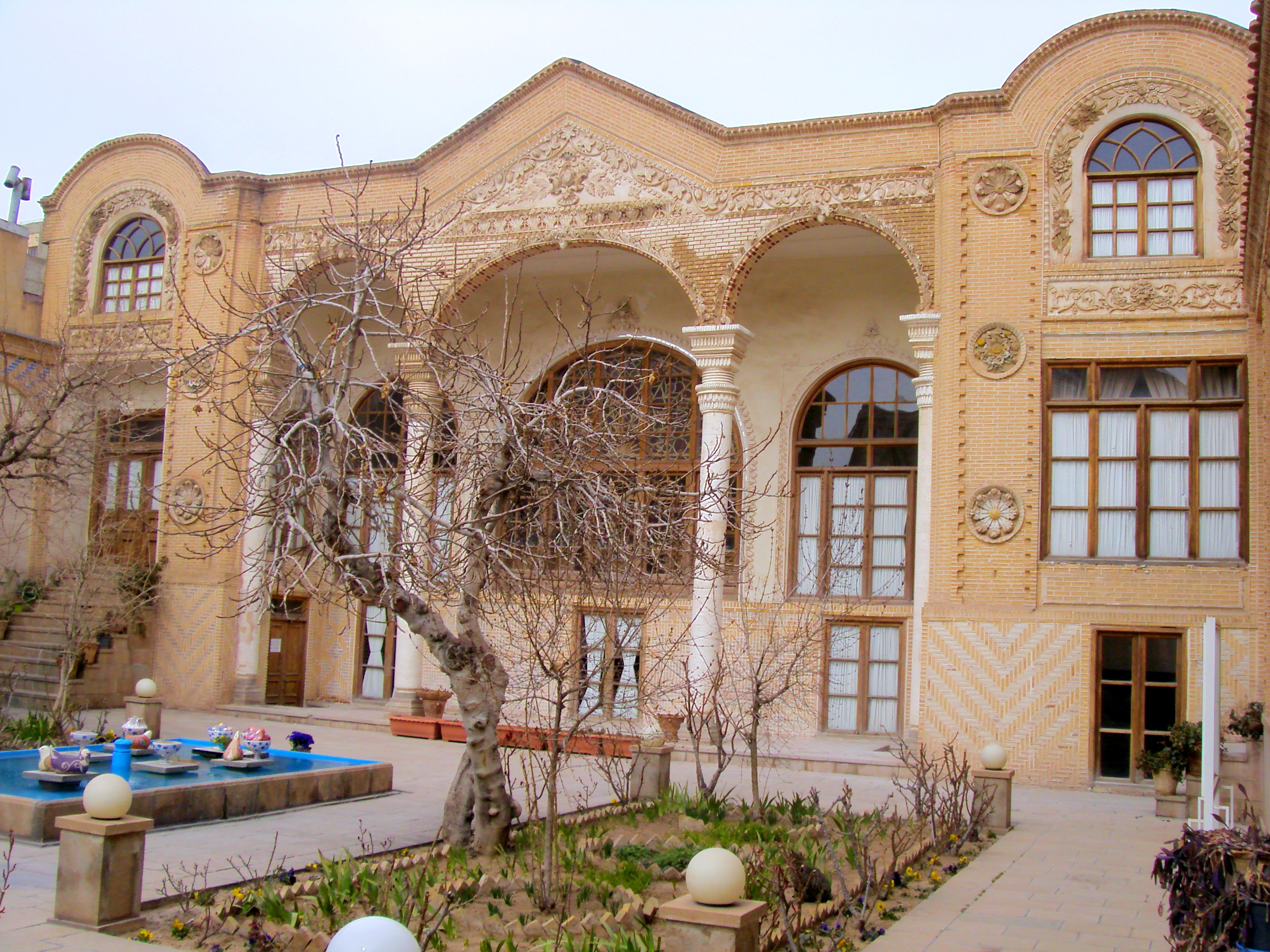

The Pottery museum (Persian: موزه سفال) is an art museum in Tabriz, Iran, established in one of the houses of the city known as Sarraflar's house, which belongs to the Qajar era.

== See also ==
- Azerbaijan Museum
- Amir Nezam House
- Constitution House of Tabriz
- Iron Age museum
