= Hoseyni, Nishapur =

Hoseyni حسيني
- Village
- Location within Iran
- Coordinates: 36°00′50″N 58°50′32″E
- Country: Iran
- Province: Razavi Khorasan
- County: Nishapur
- Bakhsh: Central
- Rural District: Darbqazi

Population (2006)
  - Total: 284
- Time zone: UTC+3:30 (IRST)
  - Summer (DST): UTC+4:30 (IRDT)

Hoseyni (Persian: حسيني, also Romanized as Ḩoseynī) is a village in Darbqazi Rural District, in the Central District of Nishapur County, Razavi Khorasan Province, Iran. At the 2006 census, its population was 284, in 71 families.
