= Hoseyni, Kurdistan =

Hoseyni حسيني
- Village
- Location within Iran
- Coordinates: 35°18′41″N 47°25′55″E
- Country: Iran
- Province: Kurdistan
- County: Dehgolan
- Bakhsh: Central
- Rural District: Howmeh-ye Dehgolan

Population (2006)
  - Total: 459
- Time zone: UTC+3:30 (IRST)
  - Summer (DST): UTC+4:30 (IRDT)

Hoseyni (Persian: حسيني, also Romanized as Ḩoseynī; also known as Husaīnī) is a village in Howmeh-ye Dehgolan Rural District, in the Central District of Dehgolan County, Kurdistan Province, Iran. At the 2006 census, its population was 459, in 101 families. The village is populated by Kurds.
