= Hoseyni, Khuzestan =

Hoseyni حسيني
- Village
- Location within Iran
- Coordinates: 30°48′00″N 48°48′00″E
- Country: Iran
- Province: Khuzestan
- County: Shadegan
- Bakhsh: Central
- Rural District: Hoseyni

Population (2006)
  - Total: 173
- Time zone: UTC+3:30 (IRST)
  - Summer (DST): UTC+4:30 (IRDT)

Hoseyni (Persian: حسيني, also Romanized as Ḩoseynī) is a village located in Hoseyni Rural District, in the Central District of Shadegan County, Khuzestan Province, Iran. At the 2006 census, its population was 173, in 31 families.
