= Azerbaijan Museum =

Museum in Tabriz, Iran

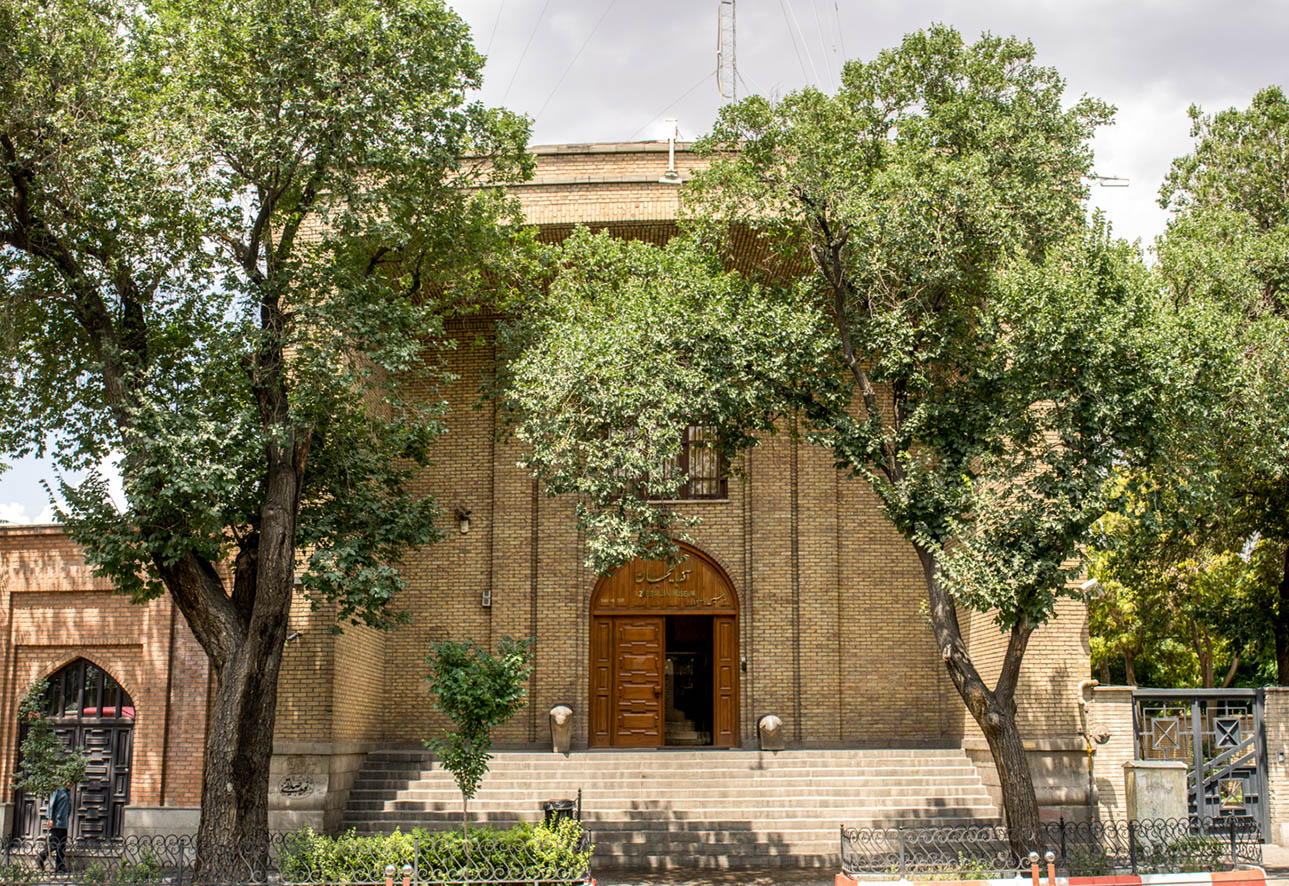
- Location: Iran
- Coordinates: 38°04′24″N 46°18′00″E
- Type: cultural property
- Location of Azerbaijan Museum

Azerbaijan Museum (Persian: موزه آذربایجان; South Azerbaijani: آذربایجان موزه‌سی) is a major archaeological and historical museum in Tabriz, northwestern Iran (East Azerbaijan province). It was established in April 1958. Located next to the Blue Mosque, the museum was designed by André Godard.

The museum consists of three major halls, a side yard, office rooms and a library. It mostly contains objects discovered from excavations in Iranian Azerbaijan, as well as artworks and sculptures. Its library contains more than 2500 books, both handwritten and printed, about history, archaeology, art and Iranian culture.

The Azerbaijan museum is the oldest museum in northwestern Iran. It exhibits objects from archaeological sites across the country, covering the full chronological span of its history. As such, it is one of the most important museums in Iran and a truly national one.

== Galleries ==
The museum has three galleries. The first gallery bears the oldest remains from 5th millennium BC via Urartu, the Achaemenid Empire until the Sasanian era (224–651 AD). The second gallery consists of two parts: one for Islamic archeology and another part for coins and seals. The third gallery includes some sculptures made by Ahad Hosseini.

== Theft ==
On 7 May 2013, five silver plates belonging to the Sasanian era were stolen from Azerbaijan museum. In November 2013, Iranian police arrested the thieves but they couldn't retrieve the stolen items.

== Gallery ==
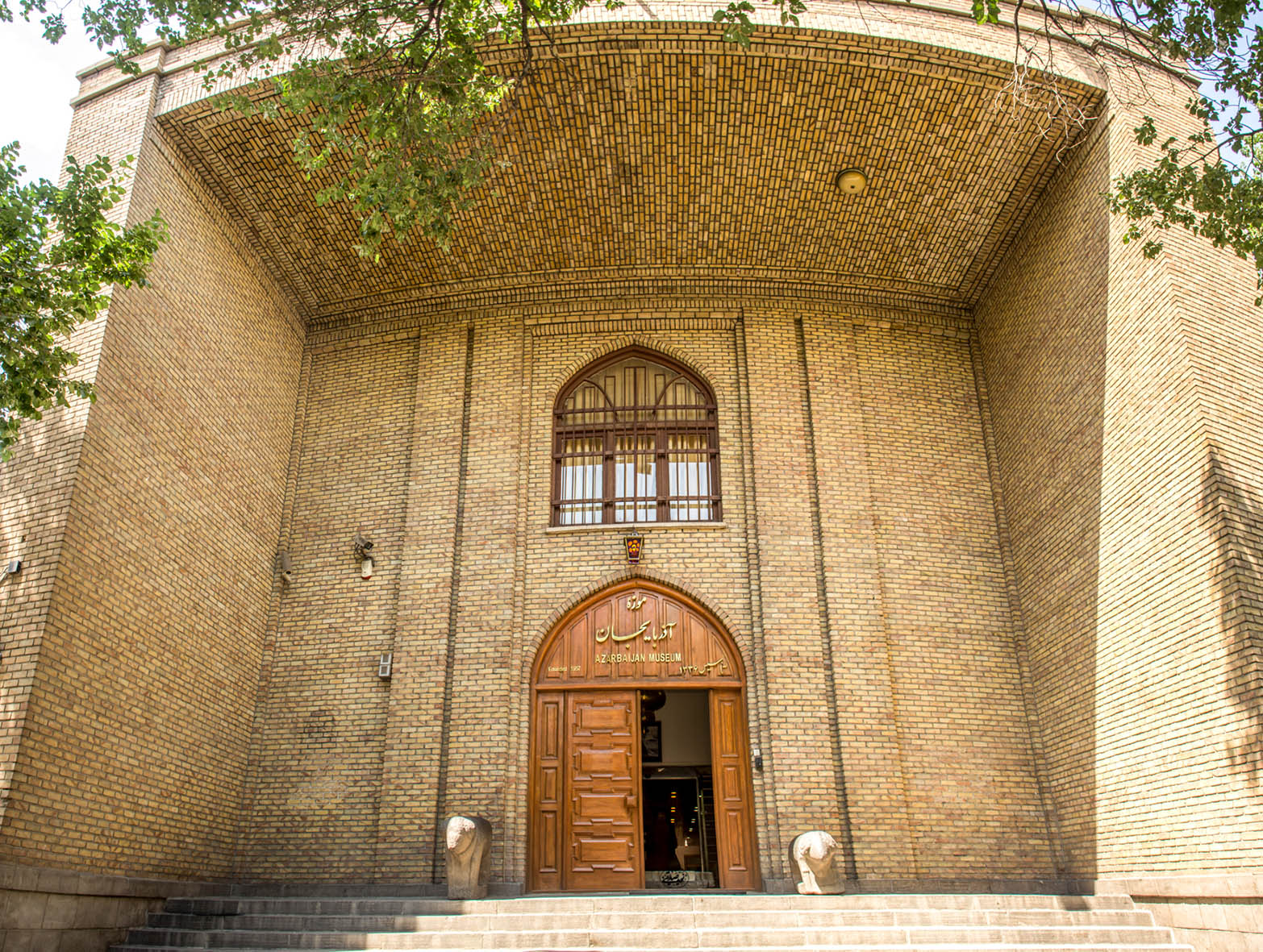
Entrance of Museum in Summer.

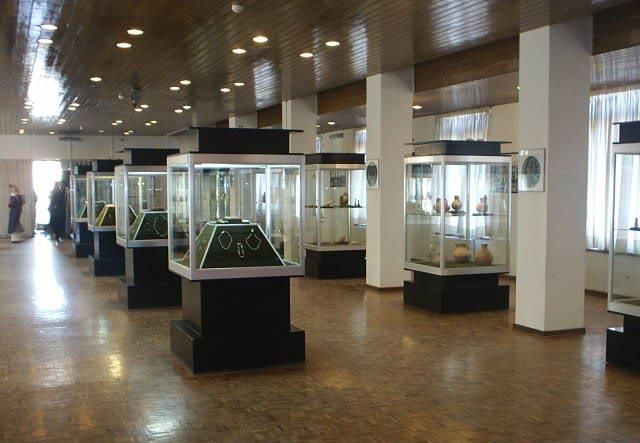
1st floor of the museum.

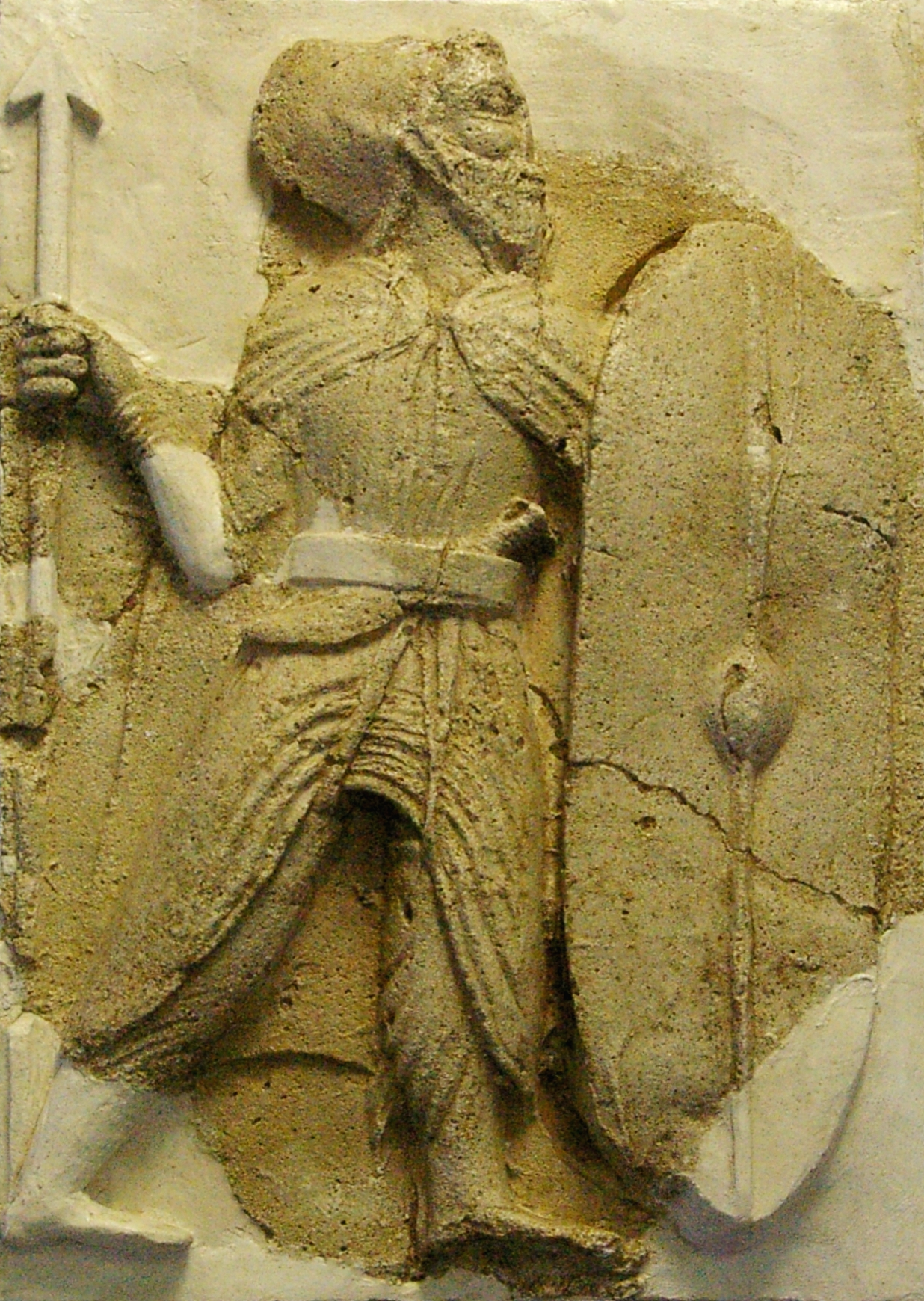
Stucco, Parthian era, Zahhak castle, Hashtrud.

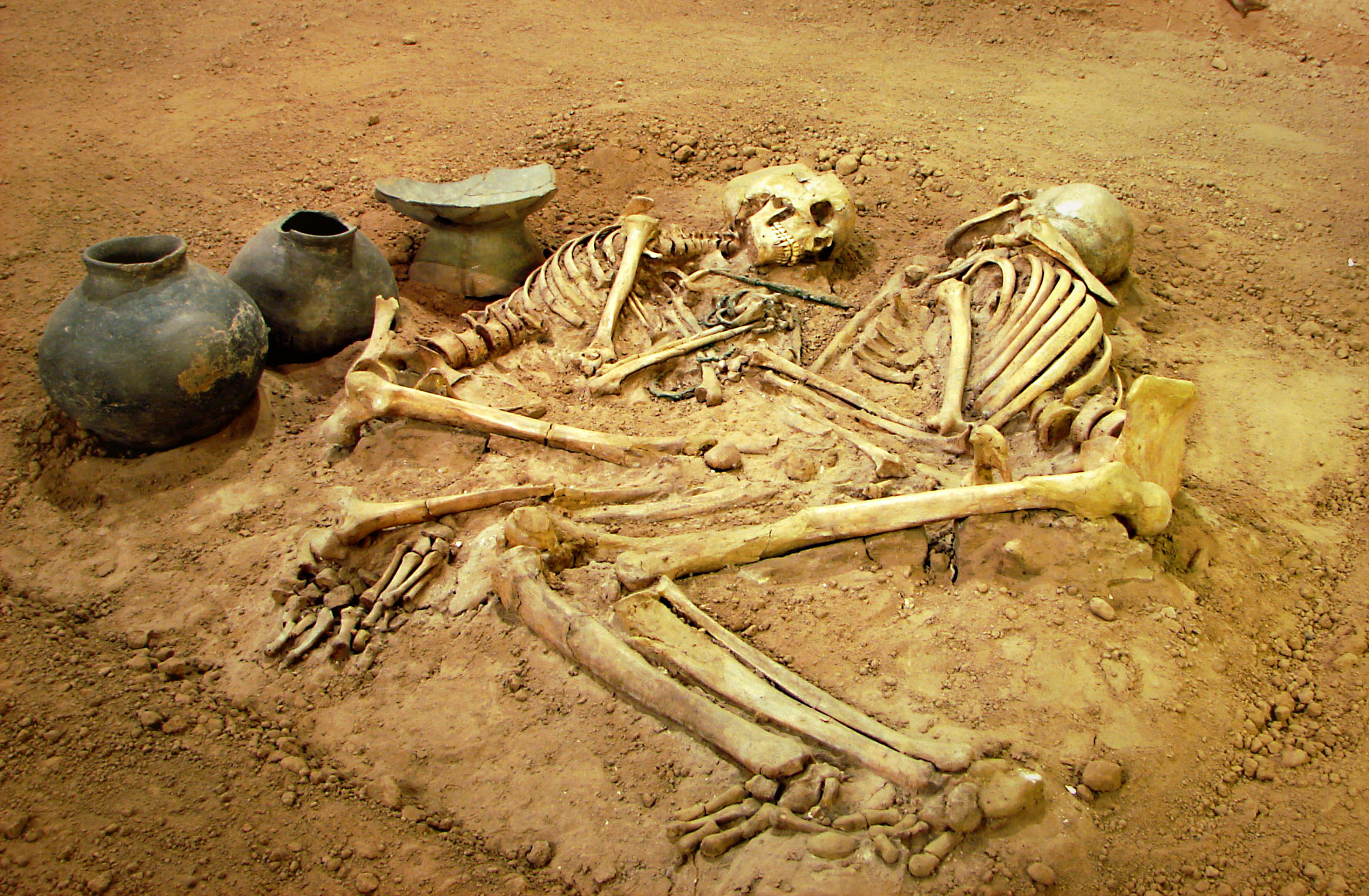
Iron Age remains

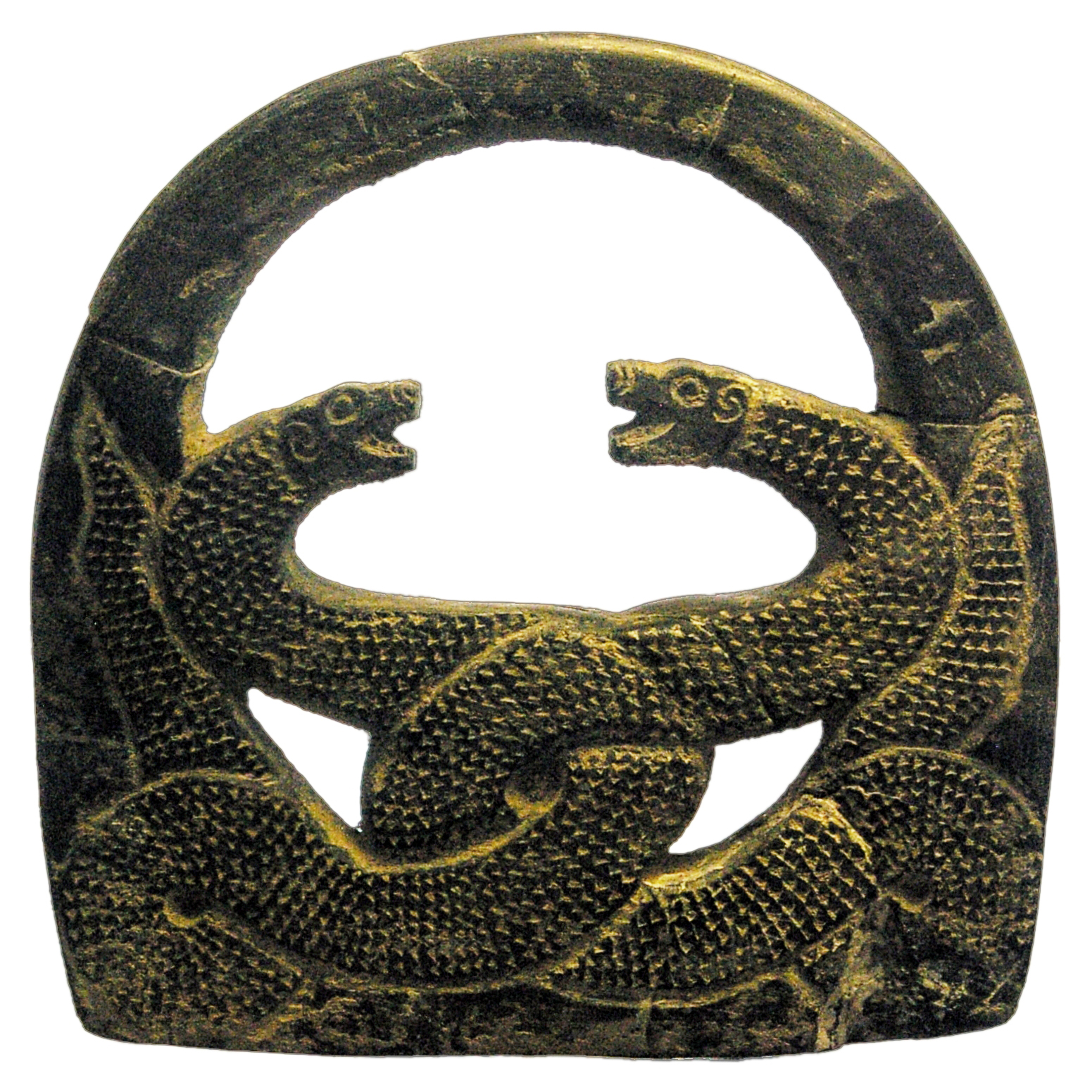
Rock weight, Jiroft, 3rd millennium BC.

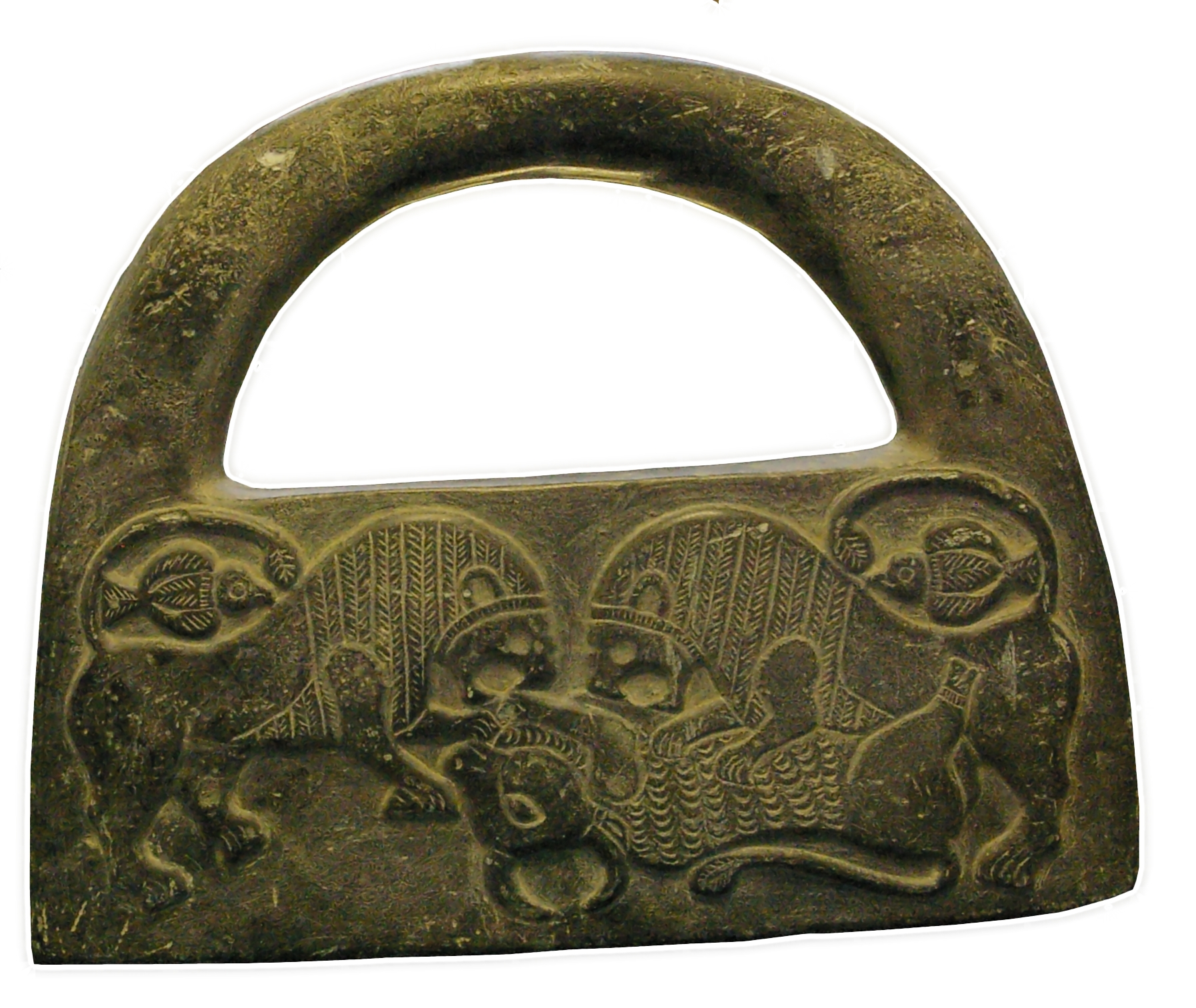
Rock weight, Jiroft, 3rd millennium BC.

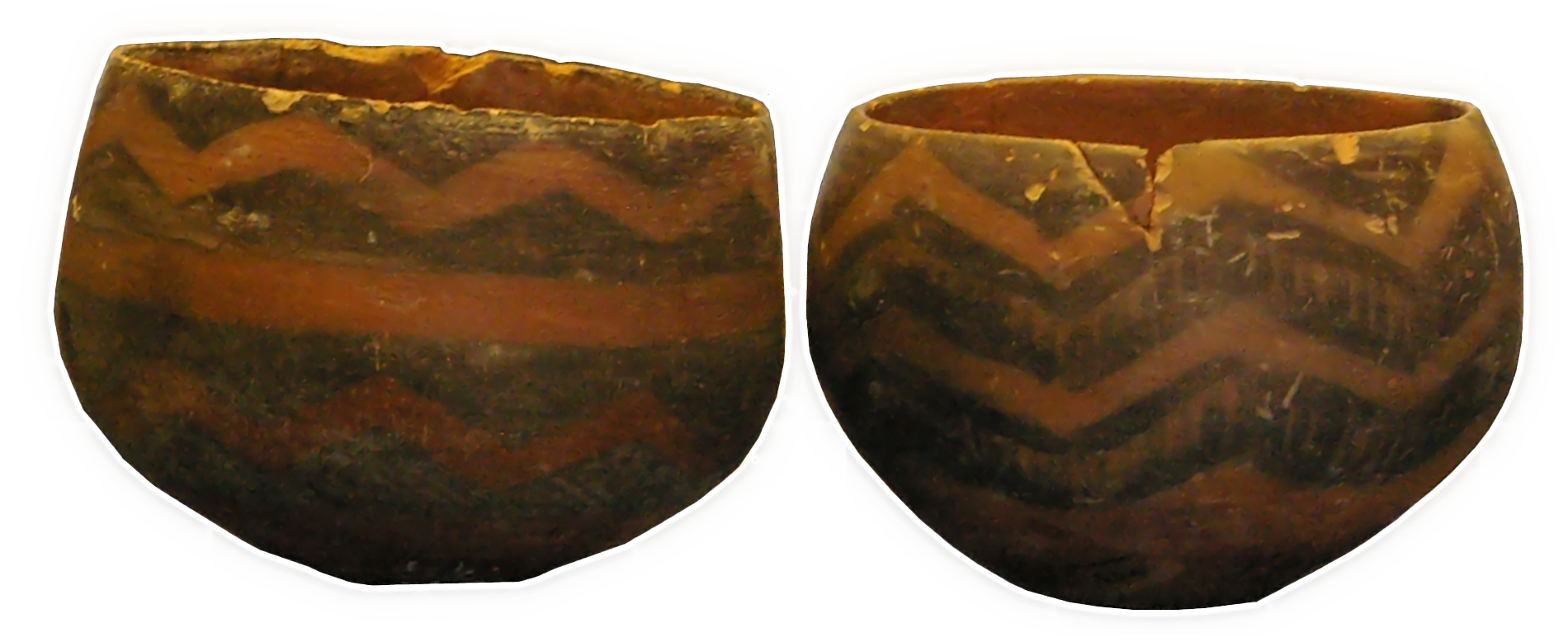
Pottery, Esmail Abad, 5th millennium BC.

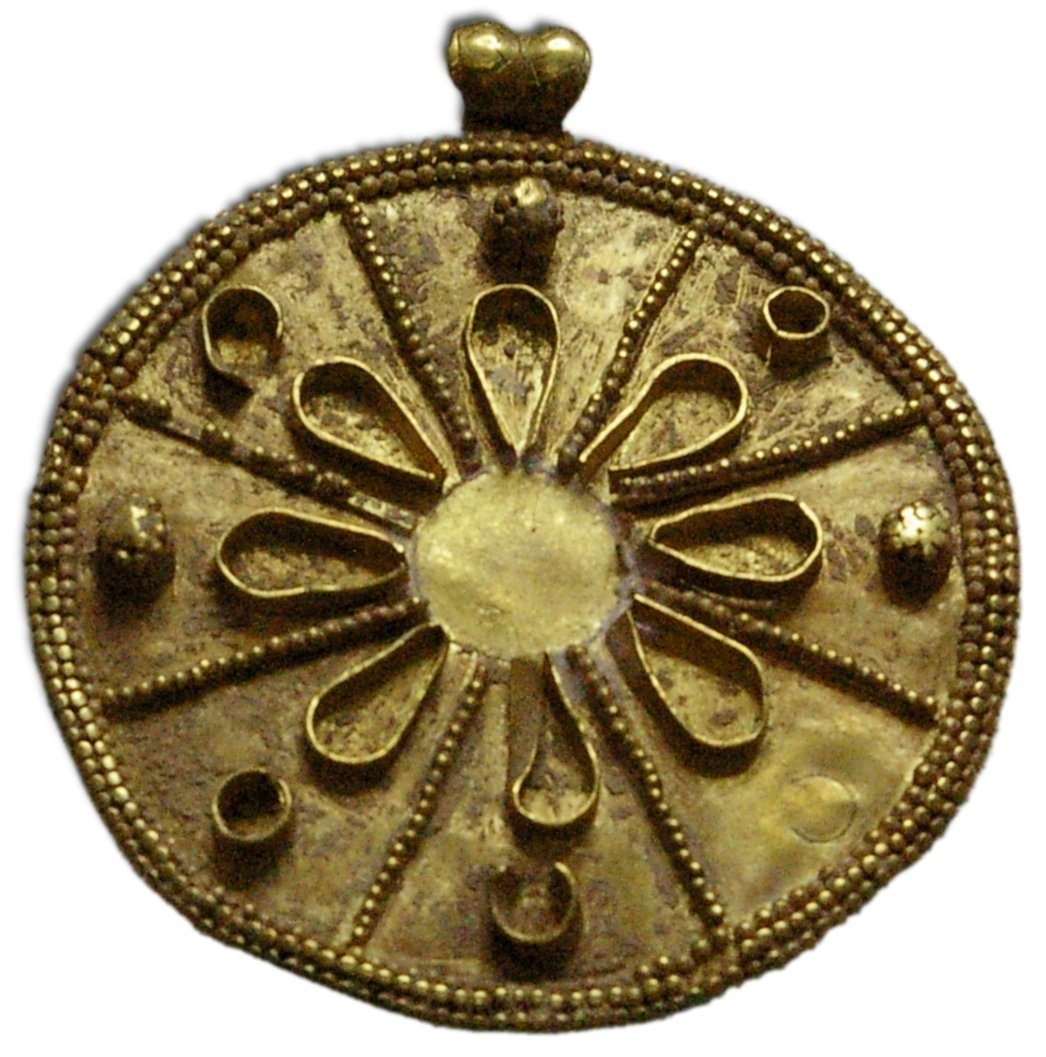
Jewelry belonging to the 1st millennium BC.

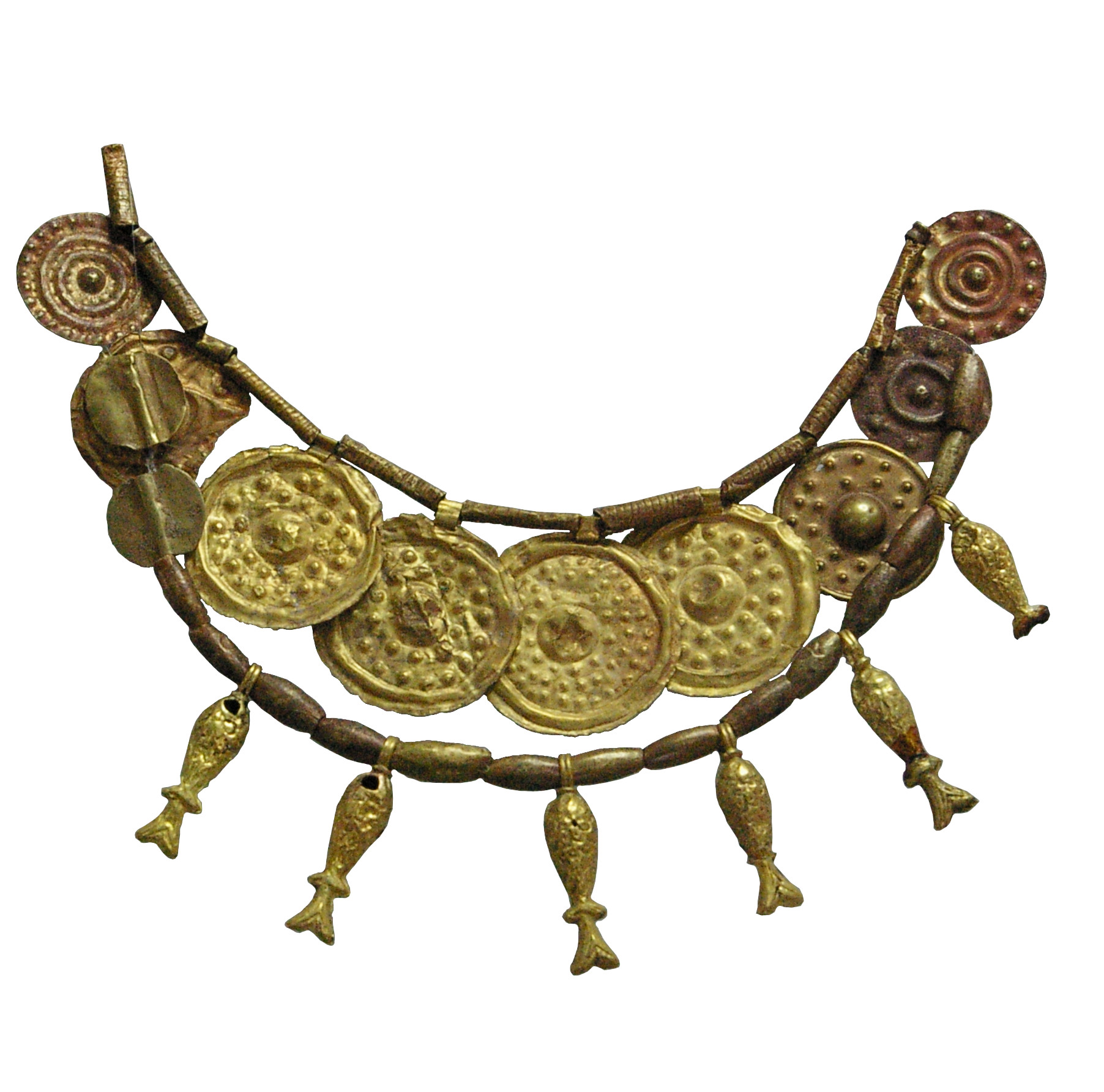
Jewelry belonging to the 1st millennium BC.

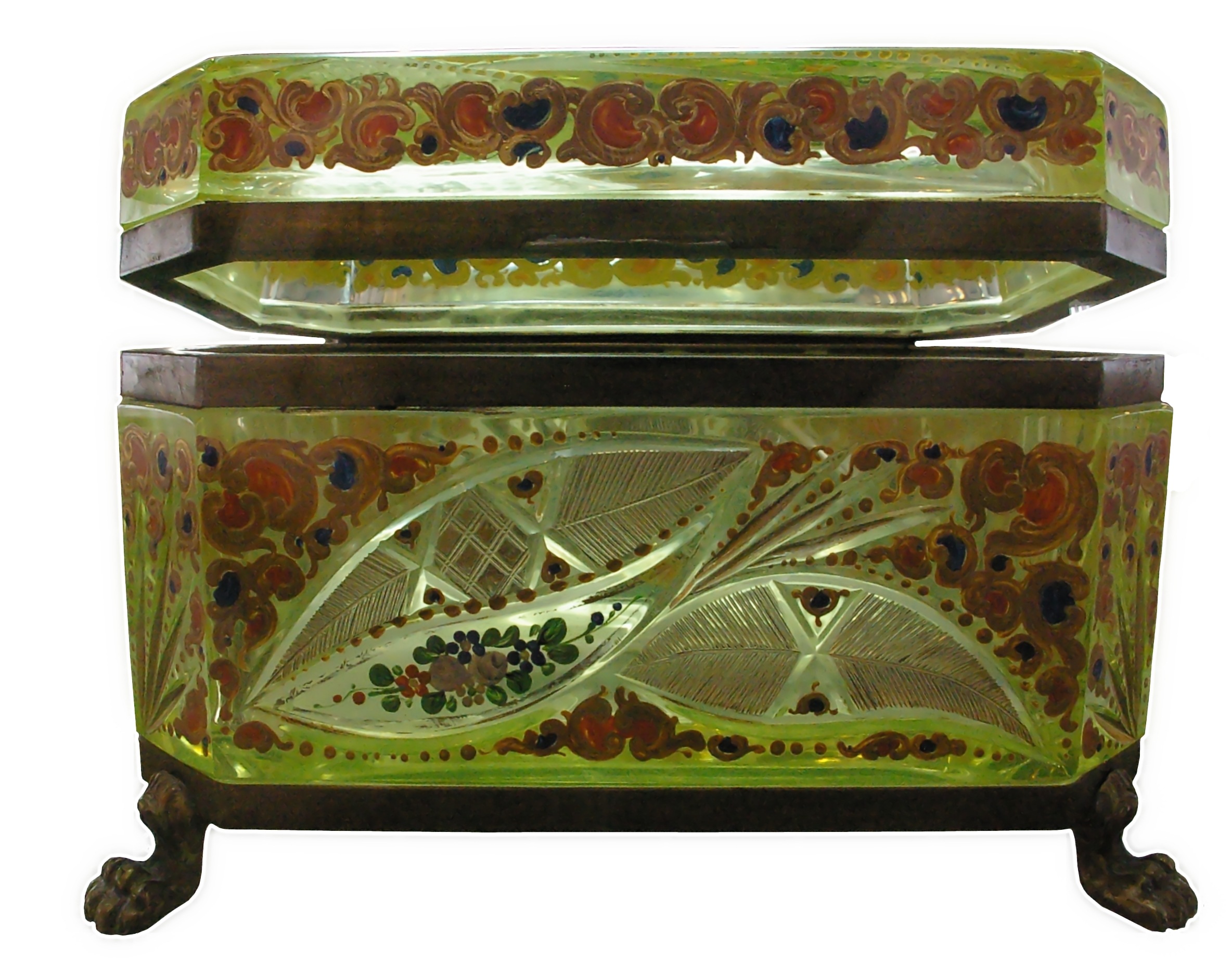
Jewel box, Qajar era (19th century).

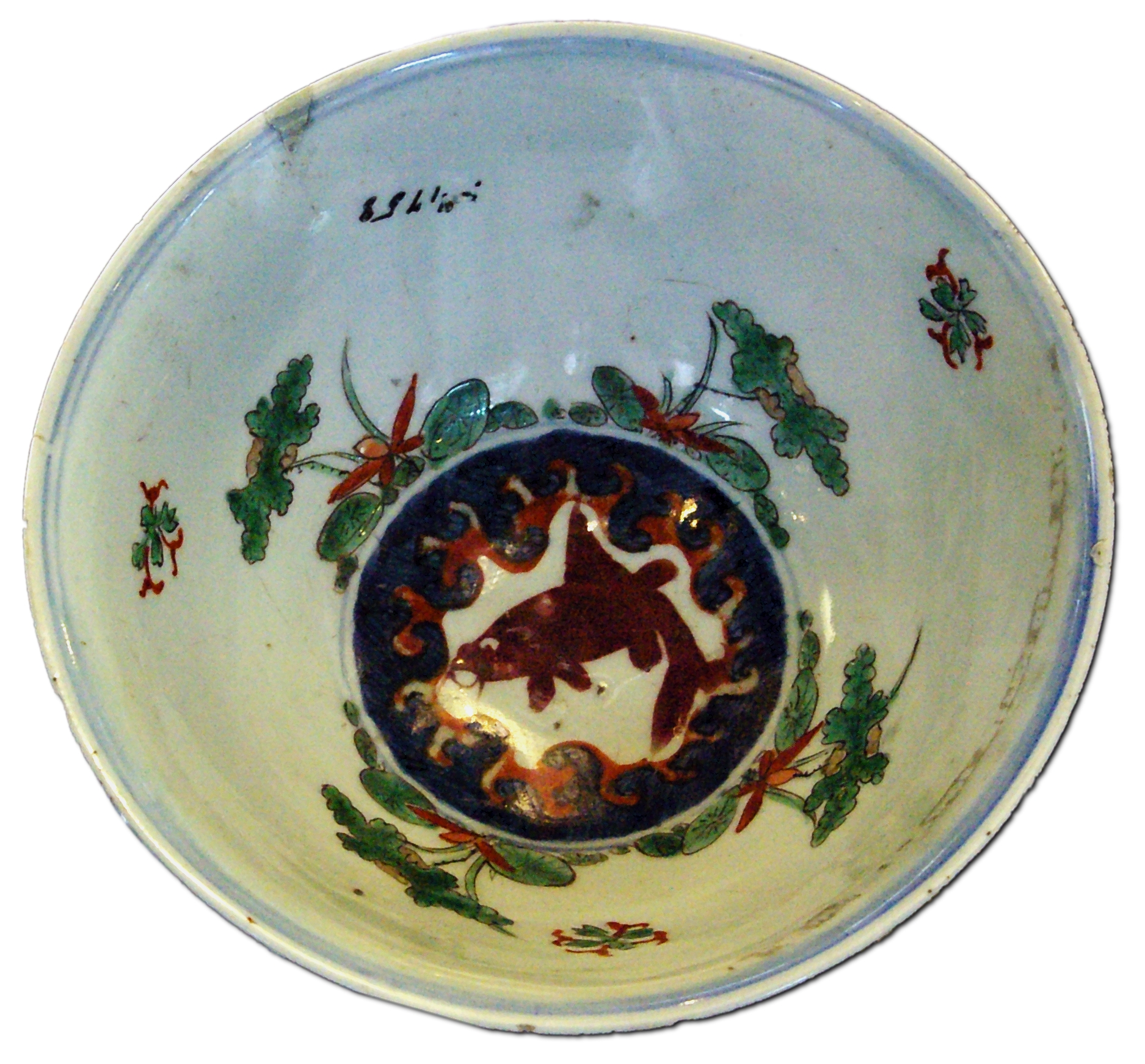
Safavid era chinaware (16th–18th centuries).

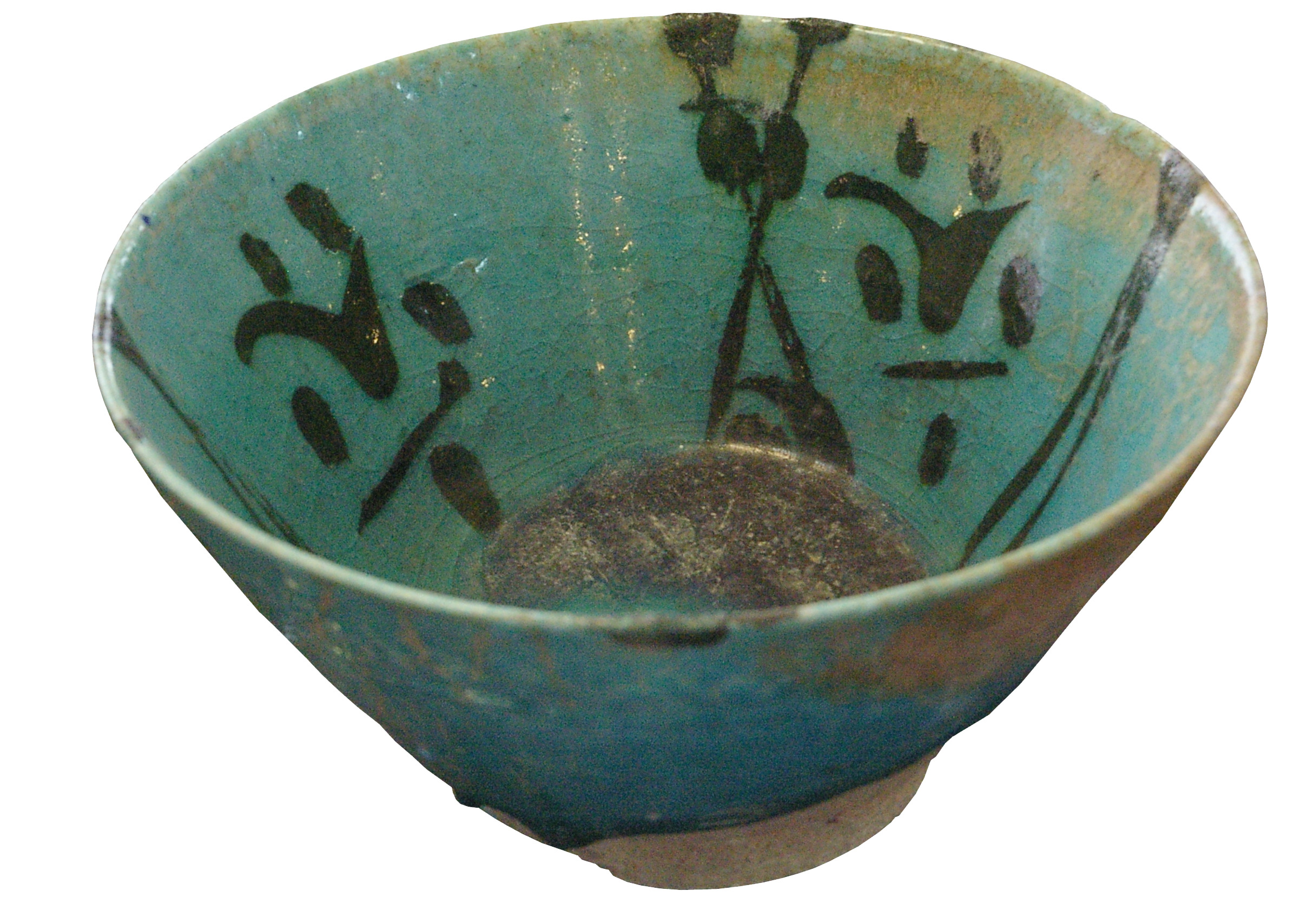
Ceramic, Gorgan, 13th century.

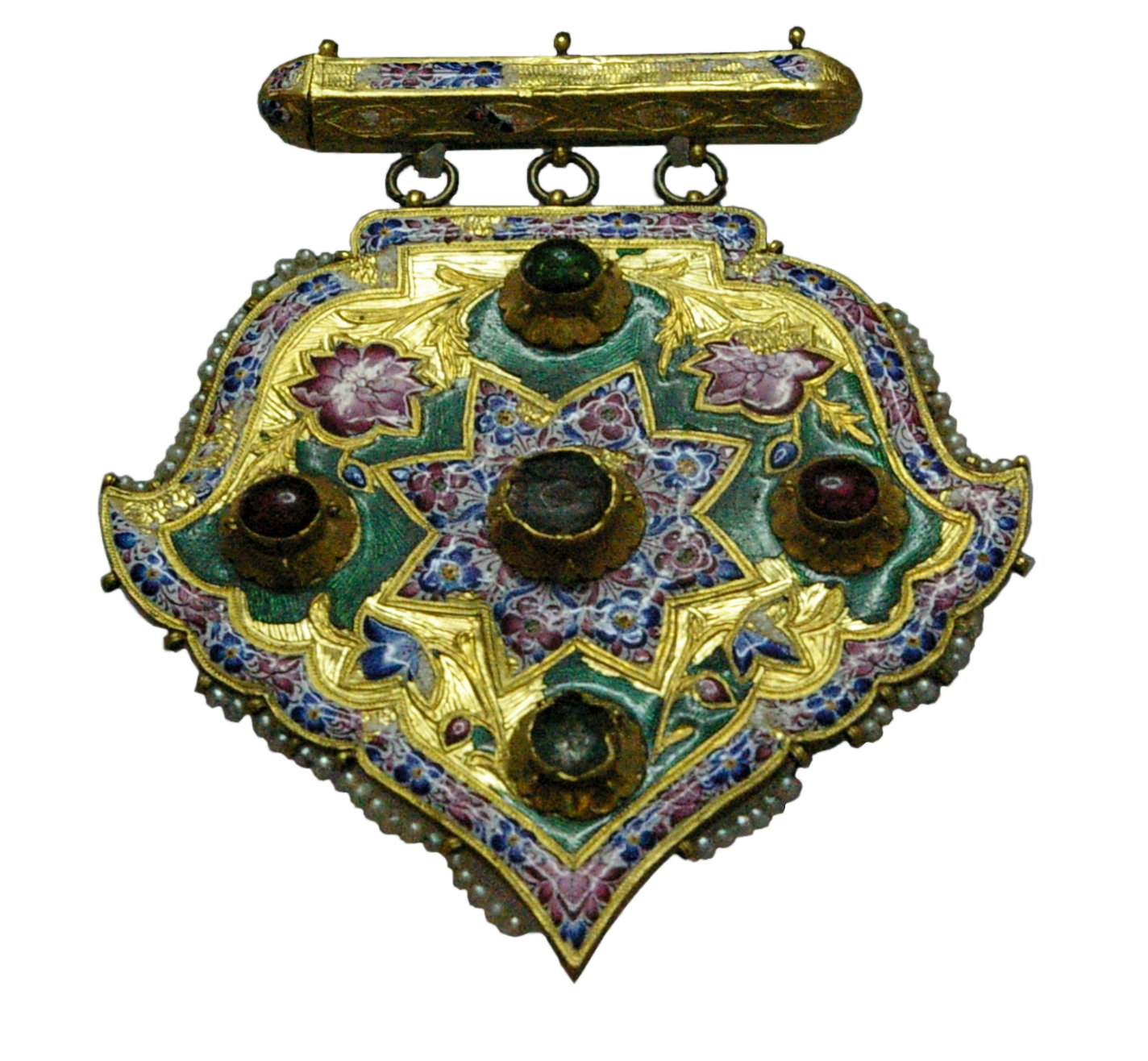
Qajar era jewel (19th century).

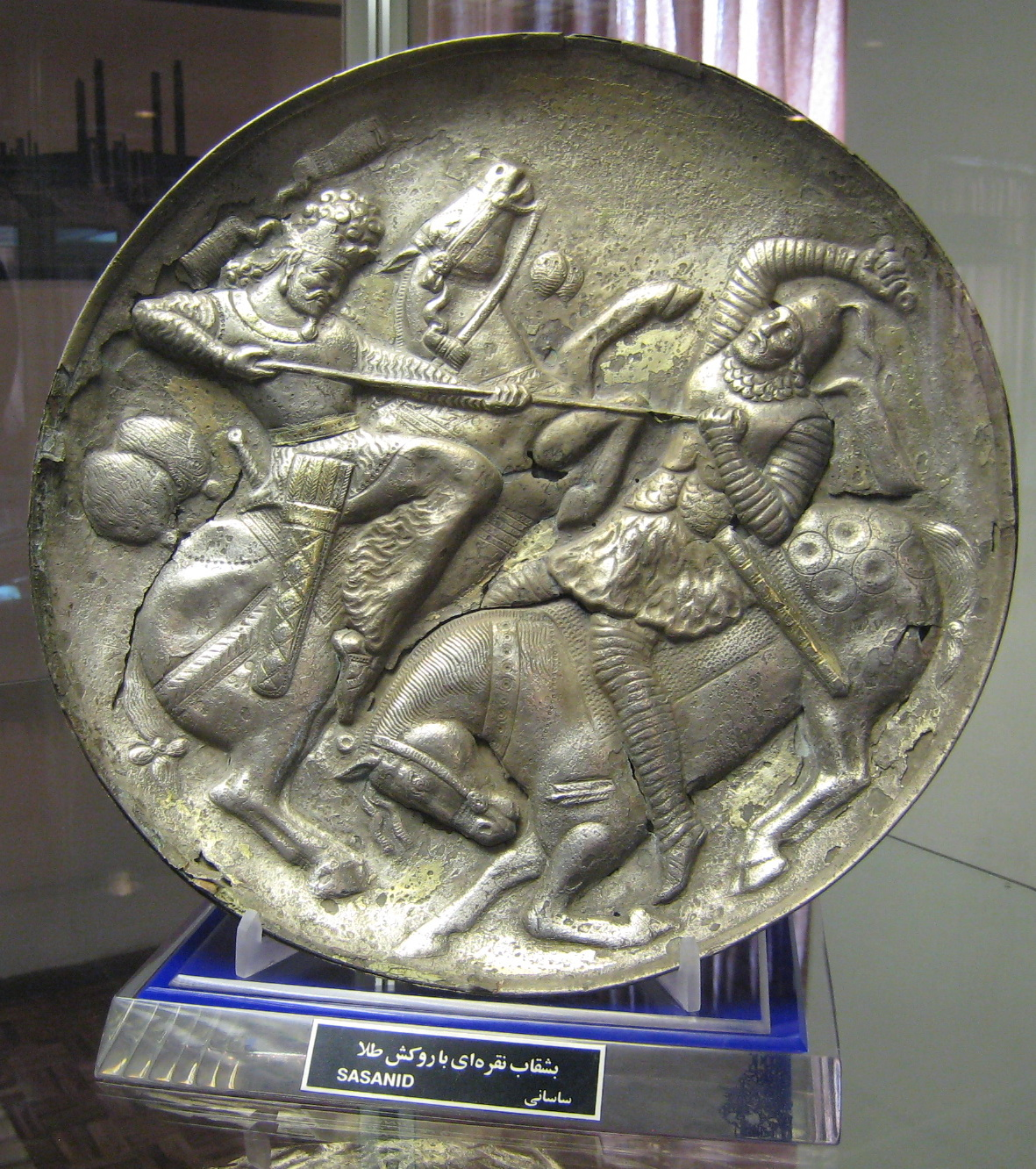
Sasanian era silver plate with golden cover.

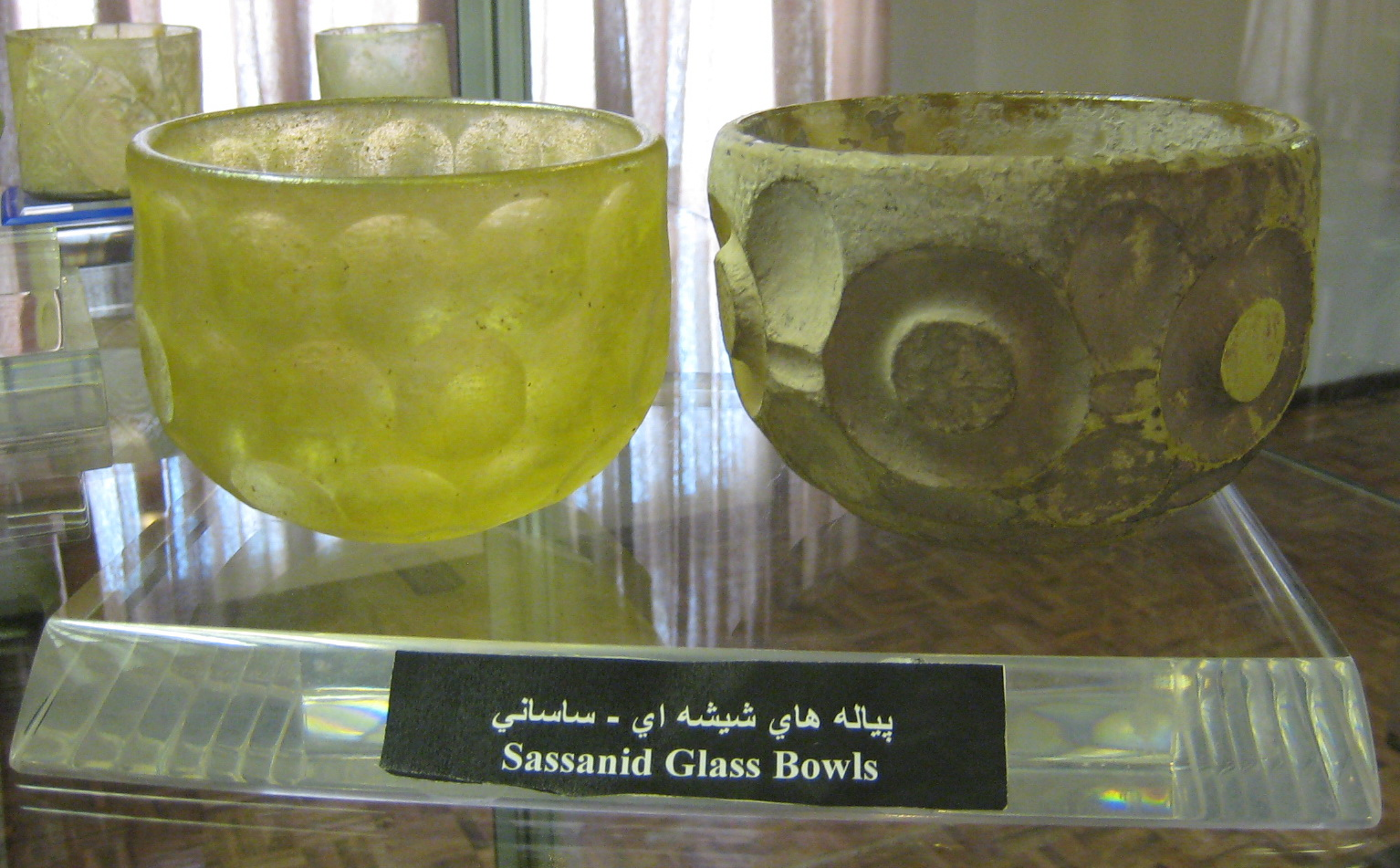
Sasanian Glassware.

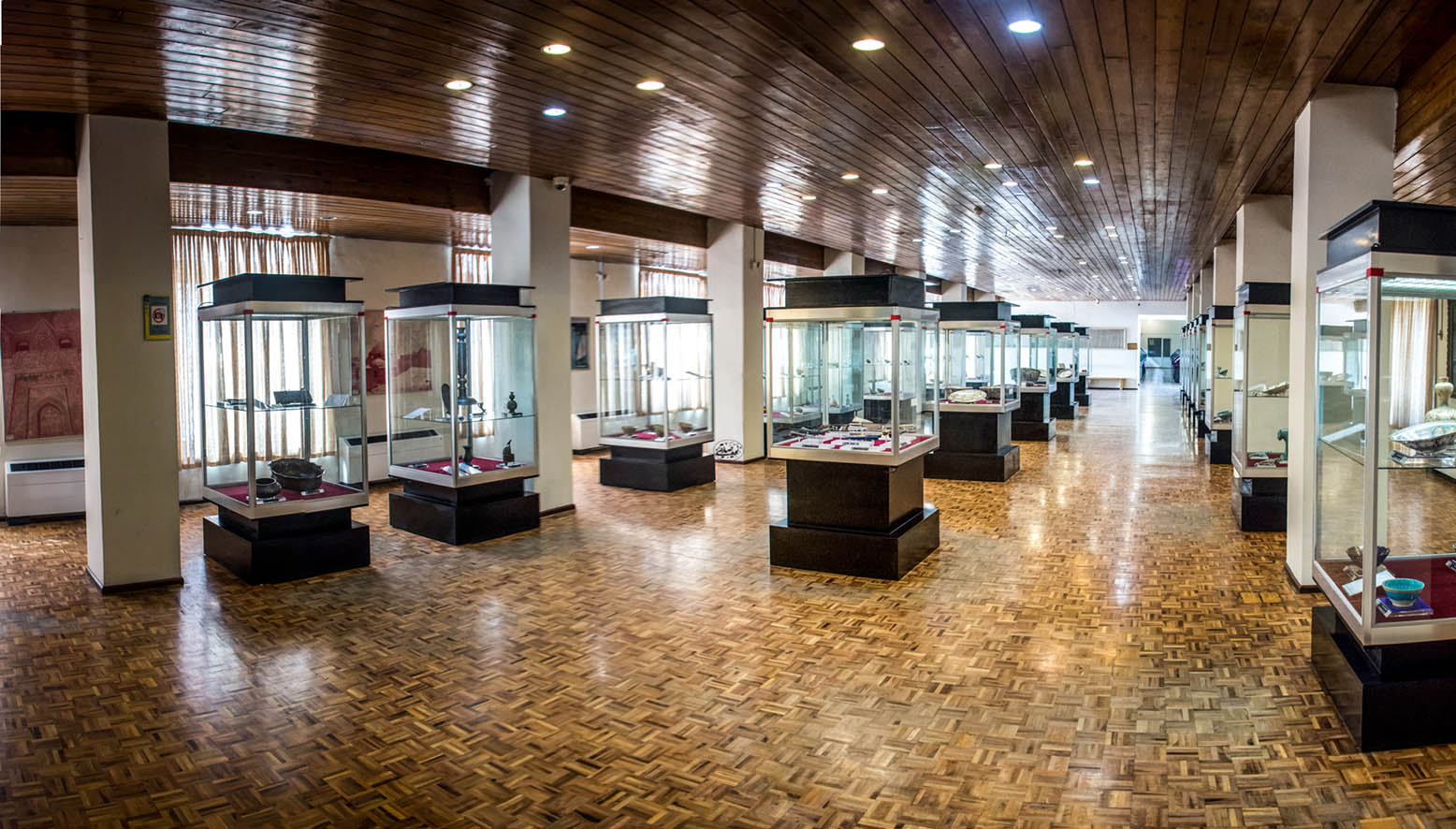
Main hall in ground floor.

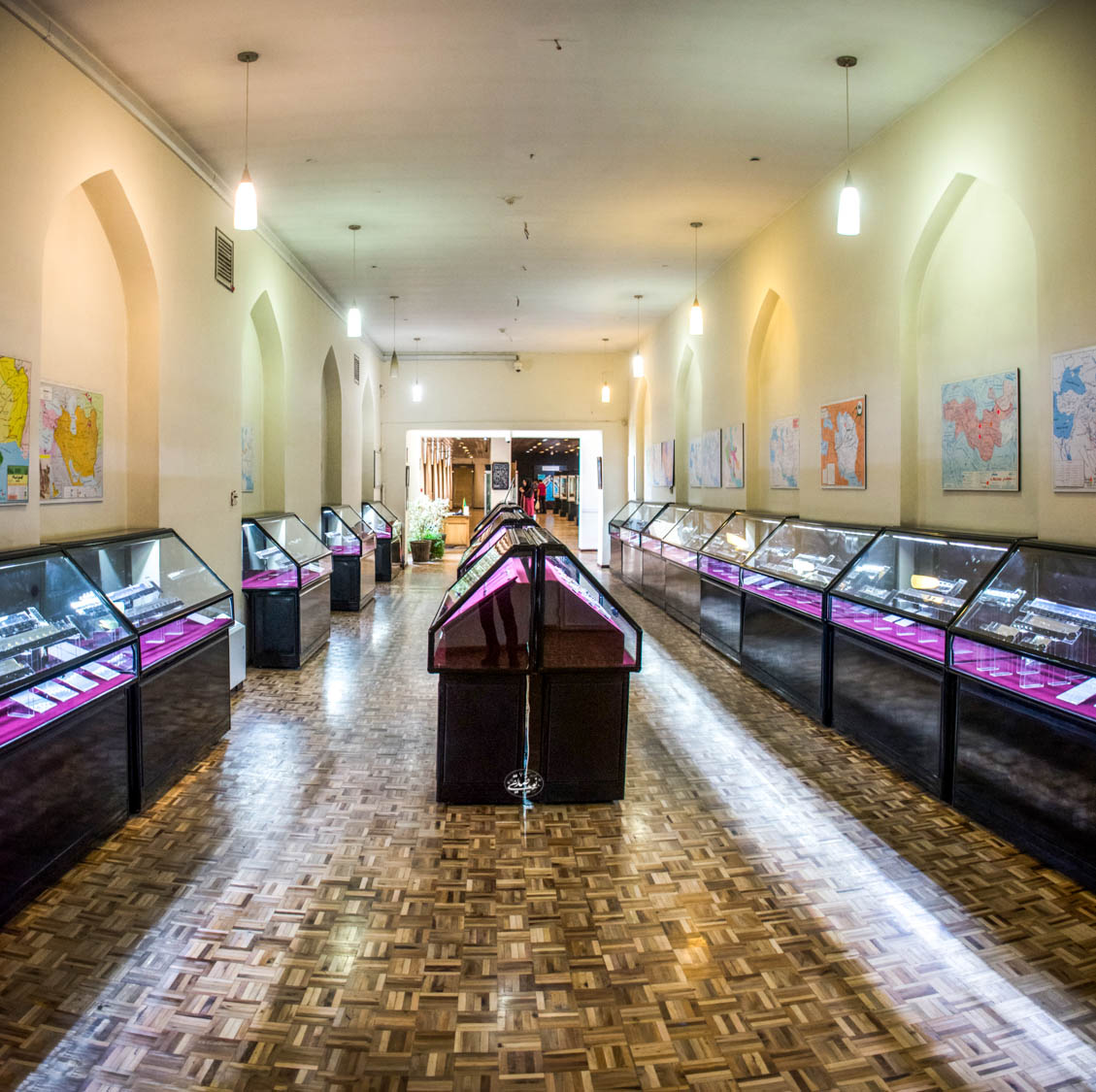
Hall of Coins.

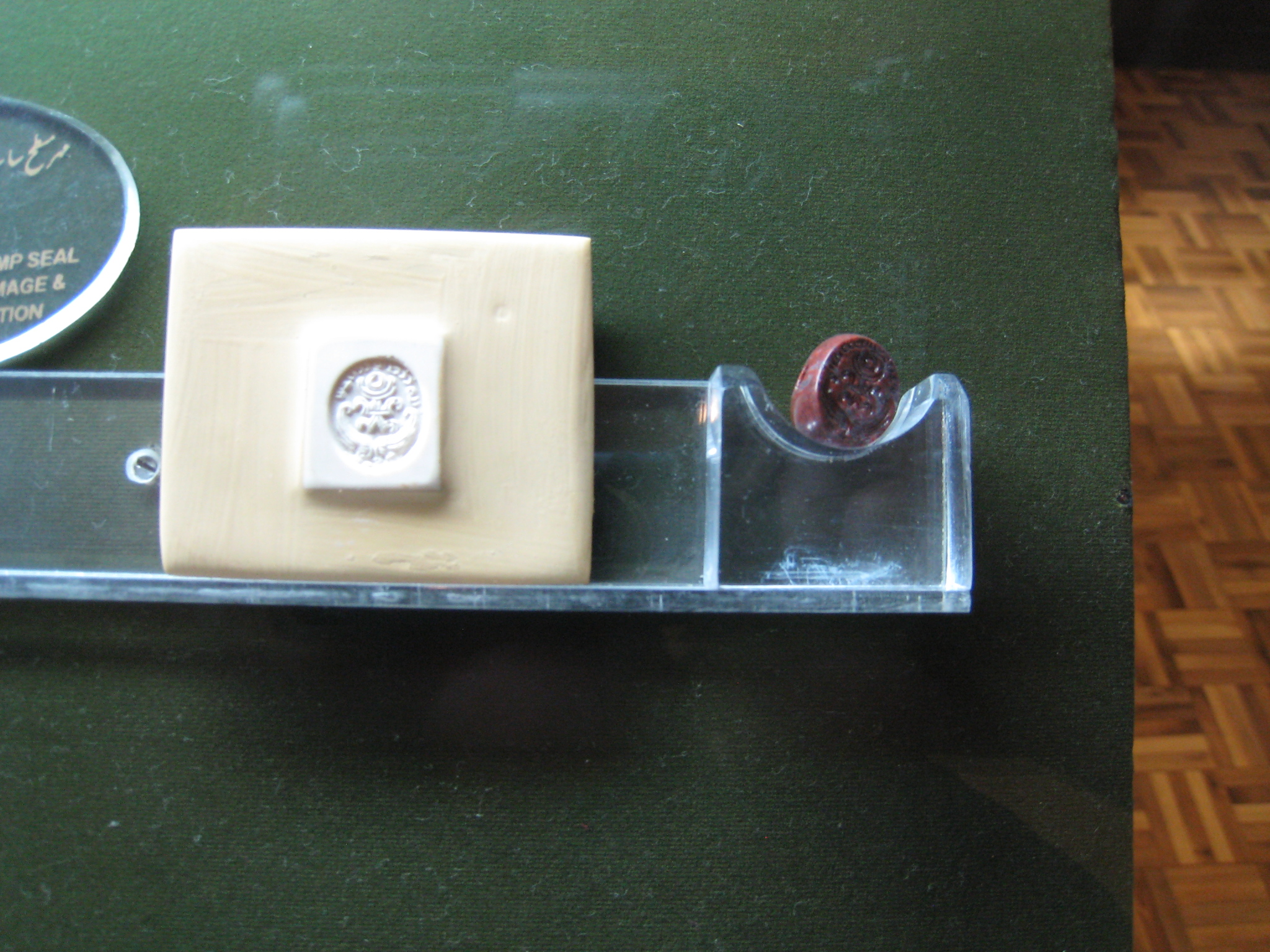
A royal seal with Pahlavic inscriptions, Hall of Coins.

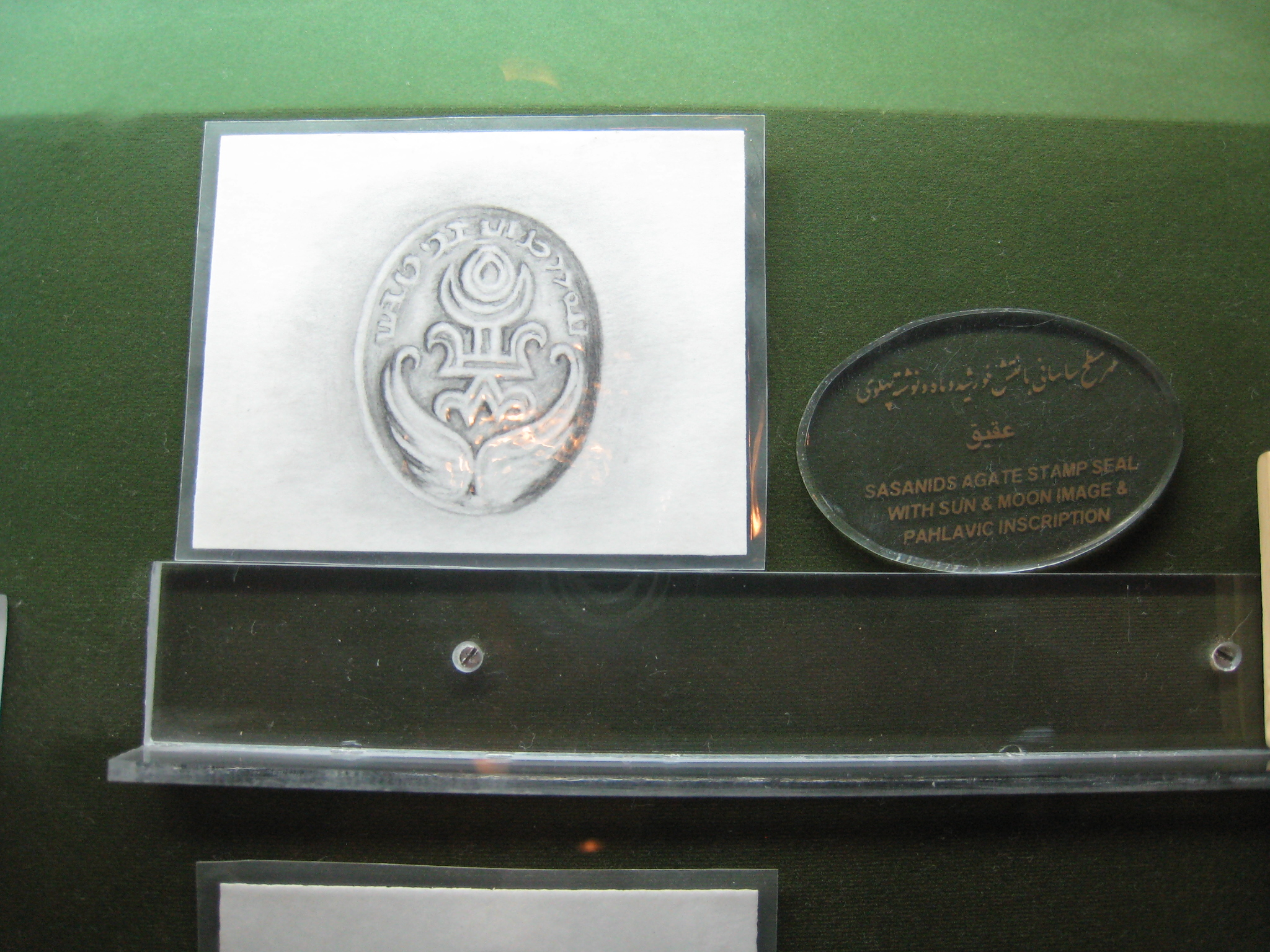
Sasanian era seal, Hall of coins.

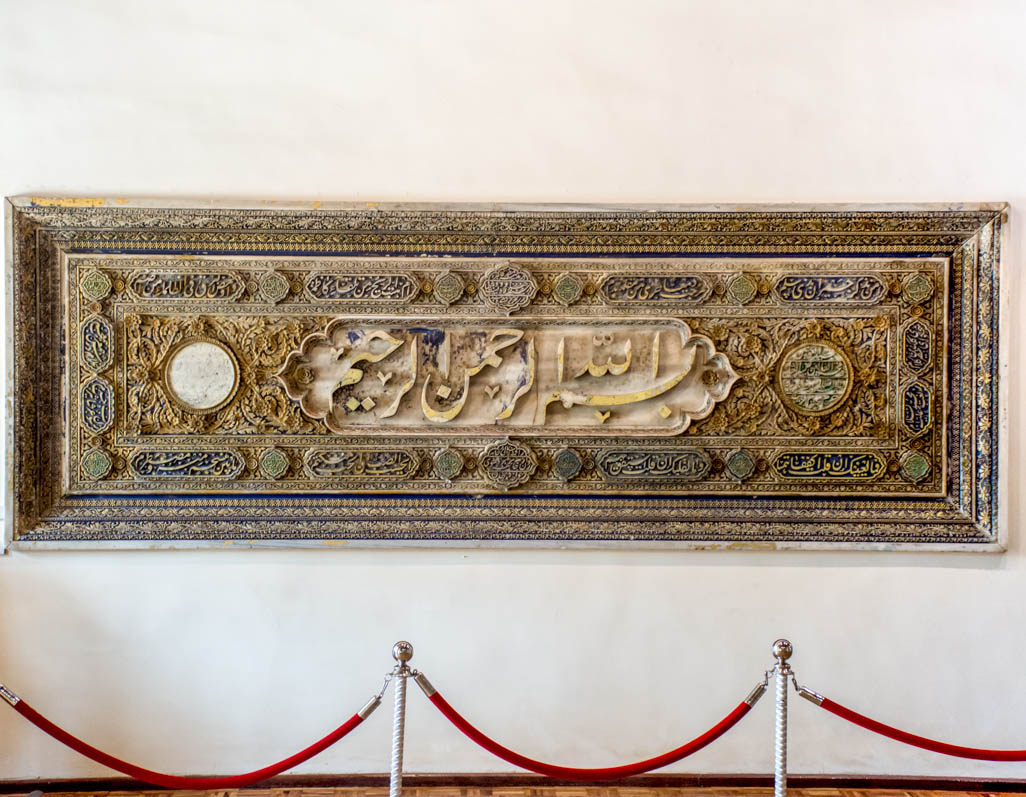
Bismila-Stone a calligraphy of marble stone, 1845.

== See also ==
- Amir Nezam House
- Constitution House of Tabriz
- Iron Age museum
- Museum of Ostad Bohtouni
- National Museum of Iran
- Pottery Museum of Tabriz
- Safir Office Machines Museum
