= M. Yousuff Hussaini =

Mohammed Yousuff Hussaini is an Indian born American applied mathematician. He is the Sir James Lighthill Professor of Mathematics and Computational Science & Engineering at the Florida State University, United States. Hussaini is also the holder of the TMC Eminent Scholar Chair in High Performance Computing at FSU. He is widely known for his research in scientific computation, particularly in the field of computational fluid dynamics (CFD) and Control and optimization. Hussaini co-authored the popular book Spectral Methods in Fluid Dynamics with Claudio Canuto, Alfio Quarteroni, and Thomas Zang. He is the editor-in-chief of the journal Theoretical and Computational Fluid Dynamics.

== Education and career ==
Hussaini received his bachelor's and master's degrees in mathematics and physics from the University of Madras, India, and a Ph.D. from the University of California, Berkeley in 1970. Hussaini began his career at the NASA Langley Research Center where he was the Director of the Institute for Computer Applications in Science and Engineering (ICASE). In 1996, he joined Department of Mathematics, Florida State University (FSU) as a Professor of Mathematics. Currently, he is the holder of the TMC Eminent Scholar Chair in High Performance Computing at FSU.

== Honors and awards ==
In 1997, Hussaini was nominated as Fellow of American Physical Society for his "scientific leadership and innovative and pioneering research in the theory and application of computational fluid dynamics, particularly spectral methods, to problems in transition, compressible turbulence, shock-turbulence interaction, and aeroacoustics."

In 2008, Hussaini was elected as Fellow of American Society of Mechanical Engineers and Fellow of American Institute of Aeronautics and Astronautics, in recognition of "professional distinction and notable and valuable contributions made to the arts, sciences, and technology of aeronautics and astronautics".

== Books ==
Hussaini has co-authored three monographs and edited or co-edited 20 books in various fields including computational fluid dynamics, turbulent flows, wavelets, flow instability, spectral methods, combustion, and finite element methods:

=== Monographs ===
- Spectral Methods in Fluid Dynamics, with C. Canuto, A. Quarteroni and T. A. Zang, Springer-Verlag, 1987.
- Spectral Methods: Fundamentals in Single Domains, with C. Canuto, A. Quarteroni and T. A. Zang, Springer-Verlag, 2006.
- Spectral Methods: Evolution to Complex Geometries and Applications to Fluid Dynamics, with C. Canuto, A. Quarteroni and T. A. Zang, Springer-Verlag, 2007.

=== Book chapters ===
- Immersed Boundary Methods for Two-Fluid Flows, with G. Tryggvason and M. Sussman, Chapter in "Computational Methods for Multiphase Flow", edited by A. Prosperetti and G. Tryggvason, Cambridge University Press, 2007.

=== Books edited ===
- Spectral Methods for Partial Differential Equations, with D. Gottlieb and R. G. Voigt, SIAM, Philadelphia, 1984.
- Theoretical Approaches to Turbulence, with D. L. Dwoyer and R. G. Voigt, Applied Mathematical Sciences 58, Springer-Verlag, 1985.
- Advances in Numerical and Applied Mathematics, with J. South, Applied Numerical Mathematics, Vol. 2, No. 3-5, North Holland, 1986.
- Studies of Vortex Dominated Flows, with M. D. Salas, Springer-Verlag, 1987.
- Stability of Time-Dependent and Spatially Varying Flows, with D. L. Dwoyer, Springer-Verlag, 1987.
- Finite Elements Theory and Application, with D. L. Dwoyer and R. G. Voigt, Springer-Verlag, 1988.
- Numerical Analysis of Spectral Methods (Translation of the French work by B. Mercier), with Nessan McGiolla Mhuris, Lecture Notes in Physics, Springer-Verlag, 1989.
- Spectral Multidomain Methods, with M. Macaraeg, Applied Numerical Mathematics, Vol. 6, No. 1-2, North-Holland 1989/1990.
- Instability and Transition to Turbulence, with R. G. Voigt, Springer-Verlag, 1990.
- Natural Laminar Flow and Laminar Flow Control Research, with R. Barnwell, Springer-Verlag, 1991.
- Major Research Topics in Combustion, with A. Kumar and R. G. Voigt, Springer-Verlag, 1991.
- Instability, Transition and Turbulence, with A. Kumar and C. L. Streett, Springer-Verlag, 1992.
- Algorithmic Trends in CFD for the 90's, with A. Kumar and M. D. Salas, Springer-Verlag, 1993.
- Computational Aeroacoustics, with J. C. Hardin, Springer-Verlag, 1993.
- Transition, Turbulence and Combustion, Volume I \ II, with Thomas B. Gatski and T. L. Jackson, Kluwer Academic Publishers, 1994.
- Wavelets - Theory and Applications, with G. Erlebacher and Leland Jameson, Oxford University Press, 1996.
- Simulation and Modeling of Turbulent Flows, with T. B. Gatski and John L. Lumley, Oxford University Press, 1996.
- Collected Papers of Sir James Lighthill, Oxford University Press, 1996.
- Multidisciplinary Design Optimization, with Natalia Alexandrov, SIAM, 1997.
- Upwind and High-Resolution Schemes, with Bram van Leer and John Van Rosendale, Springer-Verlag, 1997.
