= Malek Hosseini =

Iranian philosopher and professor (born 1968)

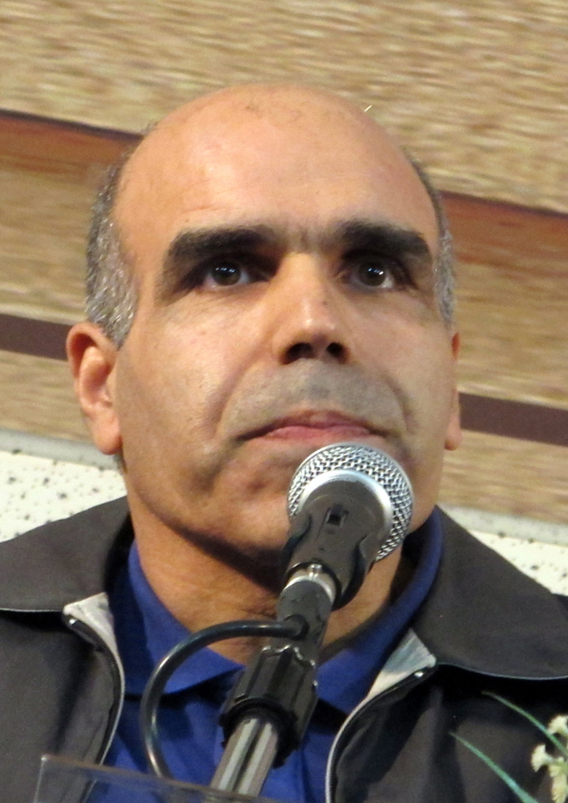
- Malek Hosseini, in 2012
- Born: 1968 (age 57–58)

Education
- Education: LMU Munich (PhD)
- Thesis: Wittgenstein und Weisheit (2006)
- Doctoral advisor: Wilhelm Vossenkuhl

Philosophical work
- Era: 21st-century philosophy
- Region: Western philosophy Islamic philosophy
- School: Analytic philosophy
- Institutions: Iranian Research Institute of Philosophy
- Main interests: Wittgensteinian philosophy, practical philosophy

Malek Hosseini (born 7 May 1968) is an Iranian philosopher and a former professor of philosophy at the Iranian Research Institute of Philosophy and the Islamic Azad University, Science and Research Branch, Tehran. He is known for his expertise on Ludwig Wittgenstein's thought and his Persian translations of Wittgenstein's works (including Tractatus Logico-Philosophicus, The Blue Book, Philosophical Investigations, On Certainty, Zettel). Hosseini is a recipient of Iran's Book of the Season Award for his book Wittgenstein und Weisheit.

== Books ==
- Wittgenstein und Weisheit, Kohlhammer Verlag, Stuttgart 2007. ISBN 978-3170197947
