= Ahad Hosseini =

Iranian Azerbaijani sculptor and painter (born 1944)

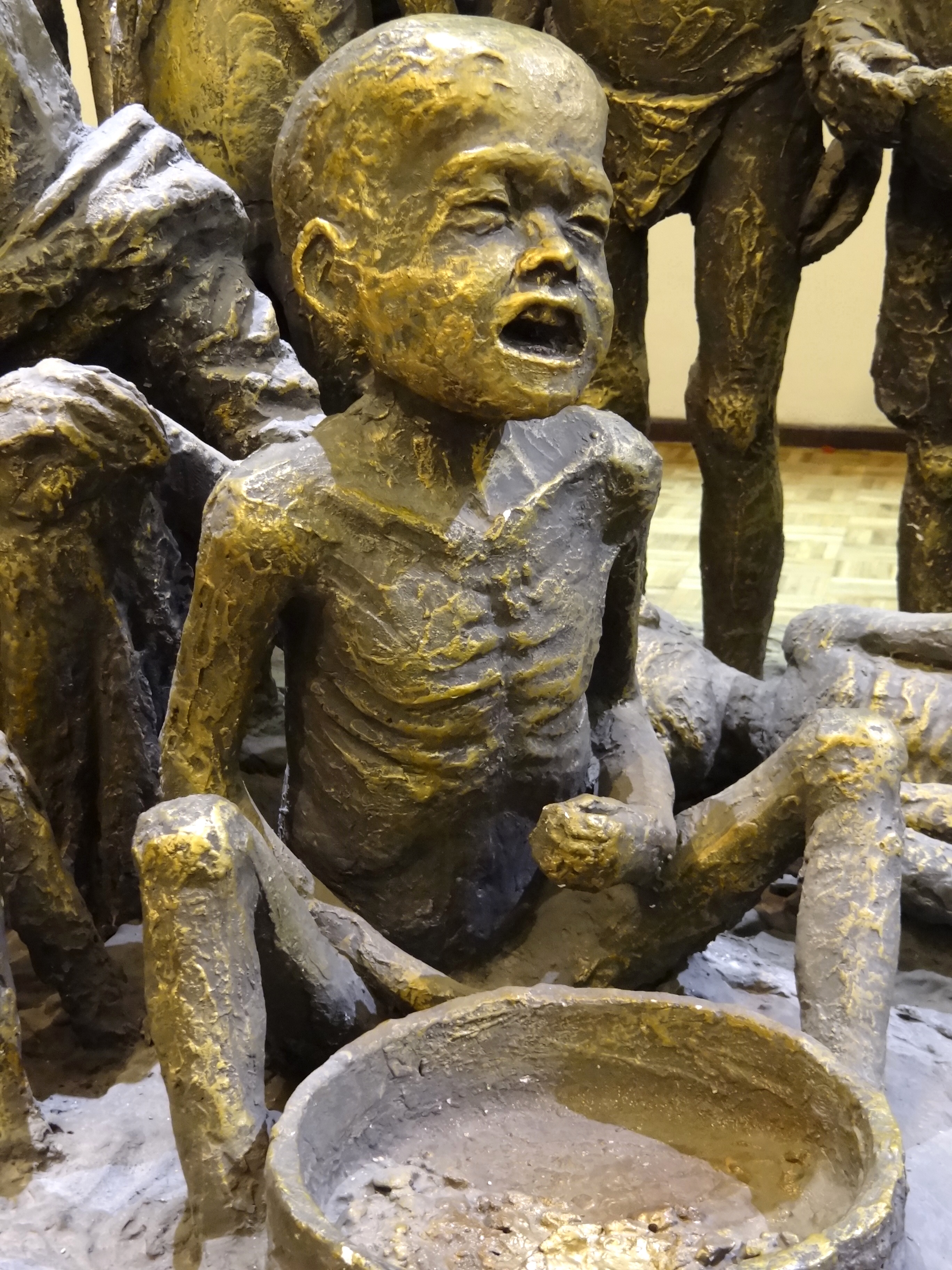
- Detail of Hunger Sculpture by Ahad Hosseini
- Born: 14 August 1944; Tabriz, East Azerbaijan, Iran
- Education: Accademia di Belle Arti Firenze
- Known for: Sculpture, painting
- Notable work: Misery Around the World, Thinking Man, Superman of Peace

Sayyid Ahad Hosseini (Persian احد حسيني; born 14 August 1944 in Tabriz) is an Iranian sculptor and painter. He is sometimes regarded as a patriotic figure and national symbol of Iran.

== Life ==
Hosseini was born in 1944 in Tabriz, East Azerbaijan province, northwest Iran. He began creating sculptures out of loneliness during his 2-year military service while working as a teacher and soldier in a small mountain village on the Caspian coast. He then briefly worked in Parviz Tanavoli's atelier in Tehran.

In 1972, he studied art in Italy as a student at the Accademia di Belle Arti (Academy of Fine Arts) in Florence. Then he returned to Tabriz and worked in his basement for 5 years to create a series of 12 sculptures called "Misery Around the World". He went on to present the sculptures to the Azerbaijan Museum, where some of them are still displayed as of December 2024.

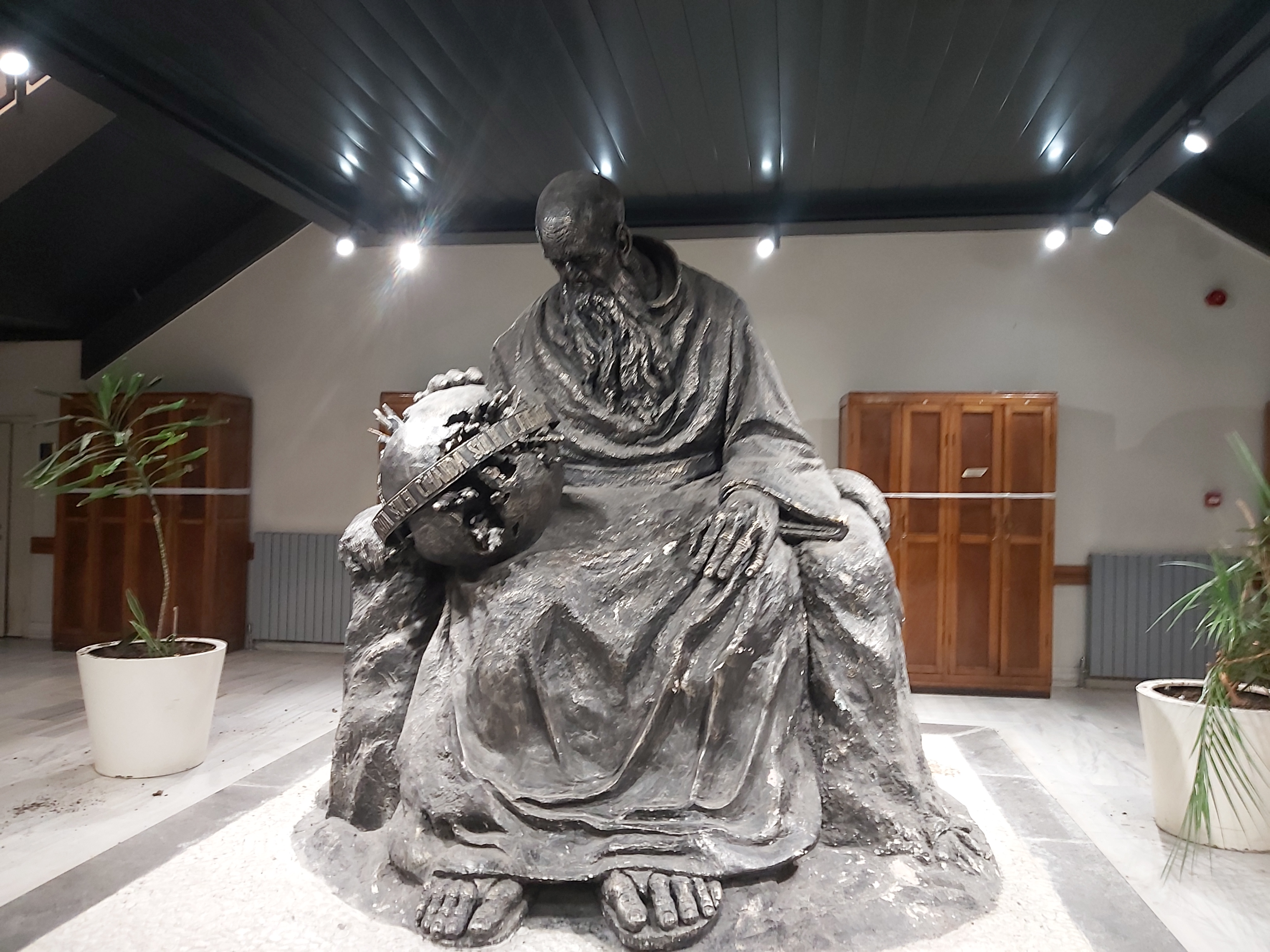
Thinking Man, Istanbul University

Between 1980 and 1982, Hosseini taught sculpture in Tabriz and edited a book entitled "What is Art?". He then lived in Turkey and made some sculptures for Istanbul University. His work "Thinking Man" is in the Istanbul University Faculty of Political Sciences.

Hosseini studied and taught at the École nationale supérieure des arts décoratifs (School of Decorative Arts) in Paris from 1984 to 1990. There he explored "form".

Hoseini's works have been displayed at many French art fairs:

- 1986 in Unesco
- 1987 in Morangis
- 1988 in Ris Orangis
- 1994 in Doaine ä Arcueil
- 1995 in Cachan Theatre
- 1996 in the Hongrios Institute and Bernanos Gallery

In March 2021, the city of Tabriz opened the Heidar Baba Art Center, a museum for contemporary sculpture. Some of Hosseini's sculptures, which were previously kept in the Azerbaijani Museum, are now displayed there.

== Works ==
Hosseini's works have been described as "[exploring] themes of human struggle and emotions in the modern age."

His first works of sculpture were of famous figures like Einstein, Bertrand Russell, Beethoven, and Dr. Albert Schweitzer. He created these during his military service.

In 1993 he made about 60 masks for a French TV show. He also created the Mona Lisa's Statue (School of Decorative Arts of Paris).

In 2005 Hosseini completed statues for the Constitutional Museum in Tabriz, unveiled in August 2005 to commemorate the 100th anniversary of the Constitutional Revolution. The statues depict important Constitutional Revolution figures such as Zainab Pasha, Ali Khataian, Aliasghar Laliabadi, Aliakbar Dehkhoda, and Sattar Khan.

Misery Around the World is a series of 12 sculptures, with each sculpture representing a form of human misery. The sculptures are Ignorance, War, Chains of Misery, The Miserable, Hunger, Political Prisoner, A Crystal Ball, Population Growth, Racial Discrimination, 5 Monsters of Death, Anxiety, and Autumn of Life.
