= Mohamed Hussein al-Husseini =

Mohamed Hossam El-Husseini

A Lebanese-Canadian, Mohamed Hussein al-Husseini Arabic: محمد حسين الحسيني) was a member of Hezbollah who lived in Montreal, Quebec and informed authorities about a vast "support network" for the organisation that existed throughout Canada, before being returned to Lebanon in 1994.

== Life ==
Born in Beirut, Al-Husseini came to Canada aboard Flight 414 at Mirabel Airport on August 6, 1991, He claimed to have been arrested the previous year after his father had protested the Syrian occupation of Lebanon. He stated that he was tortured with electrical wires, and was released only after his uncle bribed a Syrian officer with a bottle of wine. After his release, he ostensibly hid in East Beirut before boarding a ship to Cyprus, and subsequently traveling to Italy before taking a train to Frankfurt, Germany and buying a flight ticket for Canada.

On July 9, 1992 he was interrogated by the Canadian Security Intelligence Service at his shared apartment in Montreal, where he was living while collecting social assistance and studying French, and confronted with the fact a man had arrived at the airport with a Lebanese passport in al-Husseini's name. He stuck to his original story, and when asked about his opinions of Syria, noted that one day they would be punished for their occupation.

In August 1993, al-Husseini took a trip to Lebanon, despite having convinced Canadian authorities he would be tortured if he returned. After he returned, he made a September 17 call to CSIS asking why his application to become a landed immigrant was taking so long, and was told there were concerns he was connected to Hezbollah. He denied the accusation, and another meeting was set up. He was confronted with the 1988 hijacking of Kuwait Airways Flight 422, and continued denying he played any role.

CSIS interrogated him on two other occasions, during which he spoke of how widespread Hezbollah had become in Canadian cities and offered the names of Hezbollah agents living in Ottawa and Montreal as evidence. Although he was not formally accused or charged, he was frequently questioned about his relationship with the 1998 hijacking of a Kuwaiti jet. He eventually ended up recanting many of his statements, ostensibly after he realised that Canadian officials were unlikely to let him stay in the country in exchange.
