= Madrasah Akbarieh =

School in Tabriz, Iran

Coordinates: 35°29′42″N 51°05′08″E

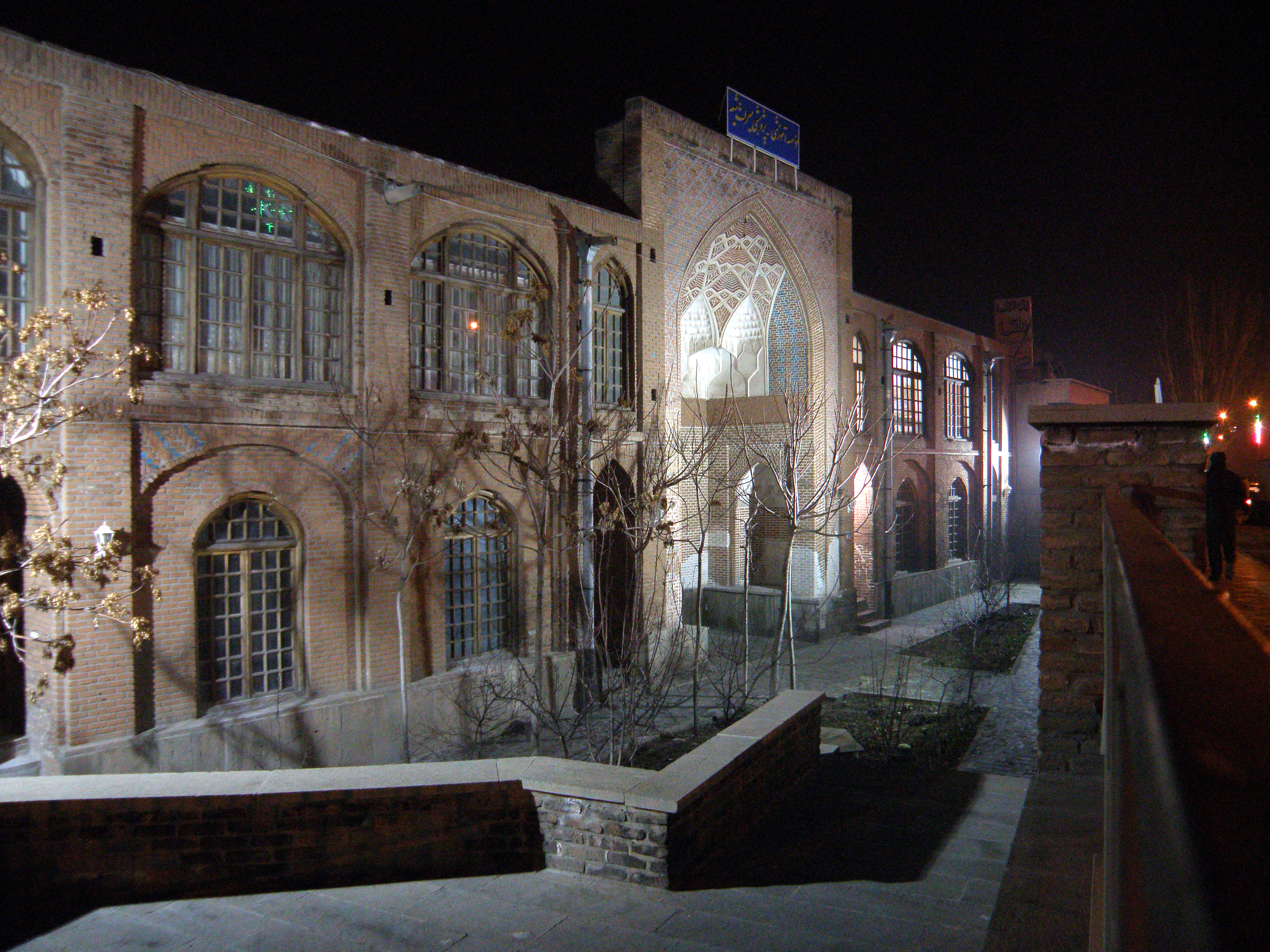
Akbariyye school

Madraseye Akbarieh was an old school in Tabriz, north-western Iran.

== See also ==
- Madrasah
- Saheb ol Amr mosque
- House of Seghat ol Islam
- The Amir Nezam House
