= Saheb-ol-Amr Mosque =

Mosque in Tabriz, Iran

Sāheb ol Amr Mosque
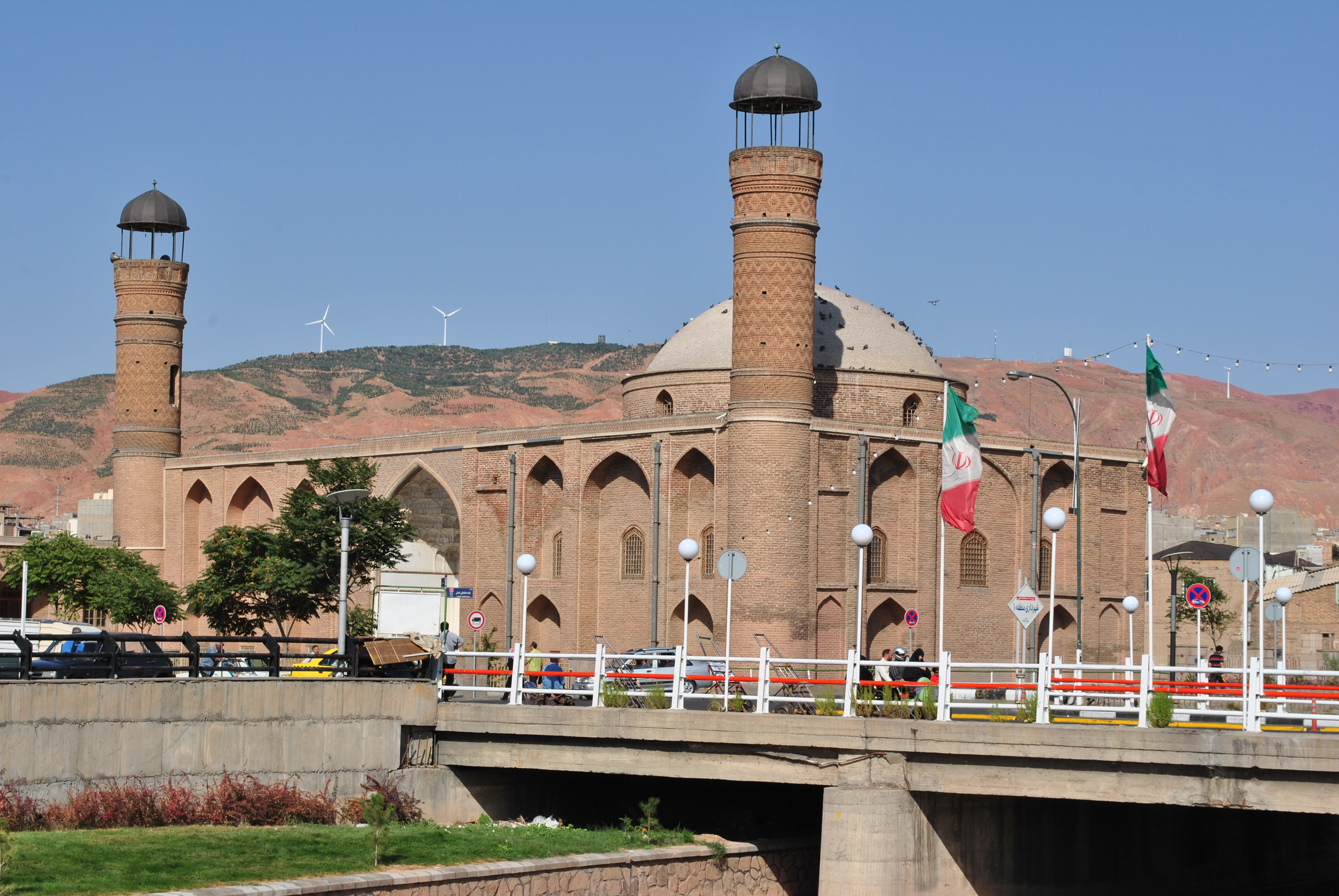
- The mosque in 2017

- Location of the mosque in Iran

Religion
- Affiliation: Shia Islam
- Ecclesiastical or organisational status: Mosque
- Status: Active

Location
- Location: Tabriz, Tabriz County, East Azerbaijan
- Country: Iran
- Coordinates: 38°05′03″N 46°17′45″E

Architecture
- Type: Mosque architecture
- Style: Safavid
- Founder: Tahmasp I
- Completed: 1636 CE (first build); c. 1640 (reconstruction); 1990s (restoration)
- Destroyed: 1638 (Note: Since rebuilt) (by Murad IV)

Specifications
- Dome: One (maybe more)
- Minaret: Two
- Materials: Bricks

Iran National Heritage List
- Official name: Sāheb ol Amr Mosque
- Type: Built
- Designated: 2 October 2001
- Reference no.: 4196
- Conservation organization: Cultural Heritage, Handicrafts and Tourism Organization of Iran

The Sāheb ol Amr Mosque (Persian: مسجد صاحب‌ الامر, romanized: Masjid-e Sāheb ol Amr; Arabic: مسجد صاحب الأمر), also known as the Shah Tahmasp Mosque, is a Shi'ite mosque, located on the east side of Saaheb Aabaad square in Tabriz, East Azerbaijan province, Iran. The mosque was rebuilt in 1636 CE and has a history of destruction and repair. The name Sāheb ol Amr (Master of command) is one of the titles of the last Twelver Shī‘ah Imām.

The mosque was added to the Iran National Heritage List on 2 October 2001, administered by the Cultural Heritage, Handicrafts and Tourism Organization of Iran.

== History ==
The mosque is said to have been built by the Safavid shah Tahmasp I (r.1524-1576), and that it was the first mosque of his reign. The mosque is sometimes known as the Shah Tahmasb Mosque.

Not long after its construction, the building was destroyed by the Ottoman ruler Murad IV after he invaded Tabriz in 1638. Once Iranian troops re-affirmed control over the city, the mosque was rebuilt but suffered great damage from an earthquake that struck the city soon after. Consequently, the entire square along with the mosque was reconstructed and this task was carried out by Goli Khan Danbali. In favour of the people, the mosque was dubbed Sāheb ol Amr, a title of the last Twelver Shī‘ah Imām, Muhammad al-Mahdi. In the 1673 map of Tabriz by Jean Chardin, the mosque appears under the name Saheb Saman and the explanation "Mosque of the last true Calif".

The school yard was destroyed during the expansion of Daraiee Street by the city of Tabriz and only a part of the school is now retained.

In ancient times, the Temple of Mithraism was located on this site. The building currently houses a mosque and a Quran museum. The mosque underwent extensive restoration during the 1990s.

== Gallery ==
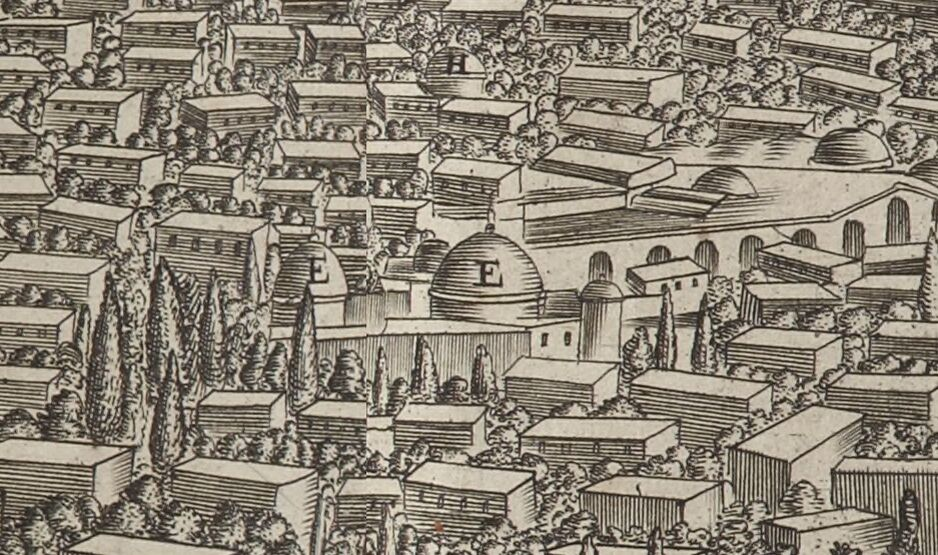
Saheb Saman Mosque (E on the map), by Jean Chardin (1673).

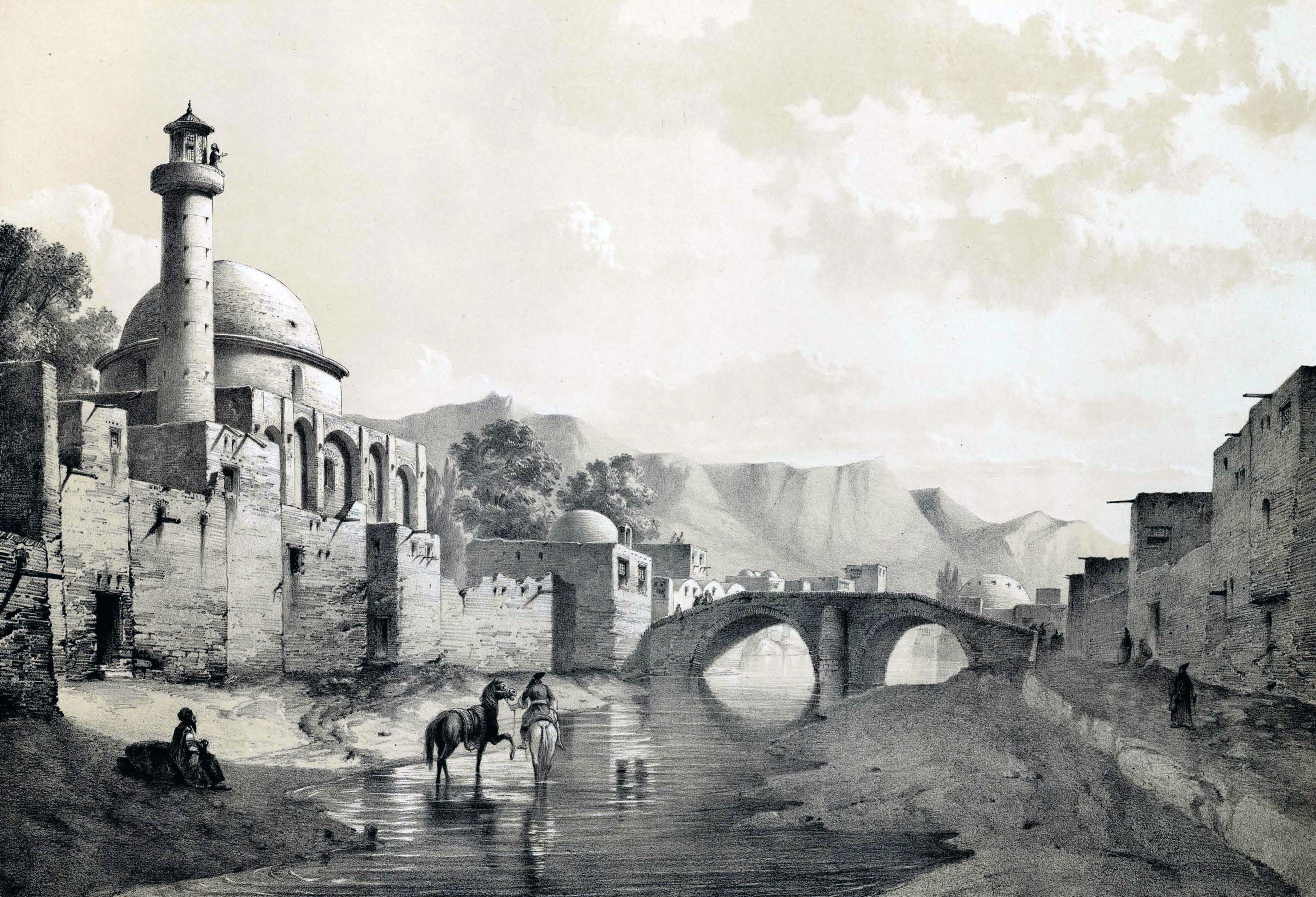
luustration by Eugène Flandin, 1840

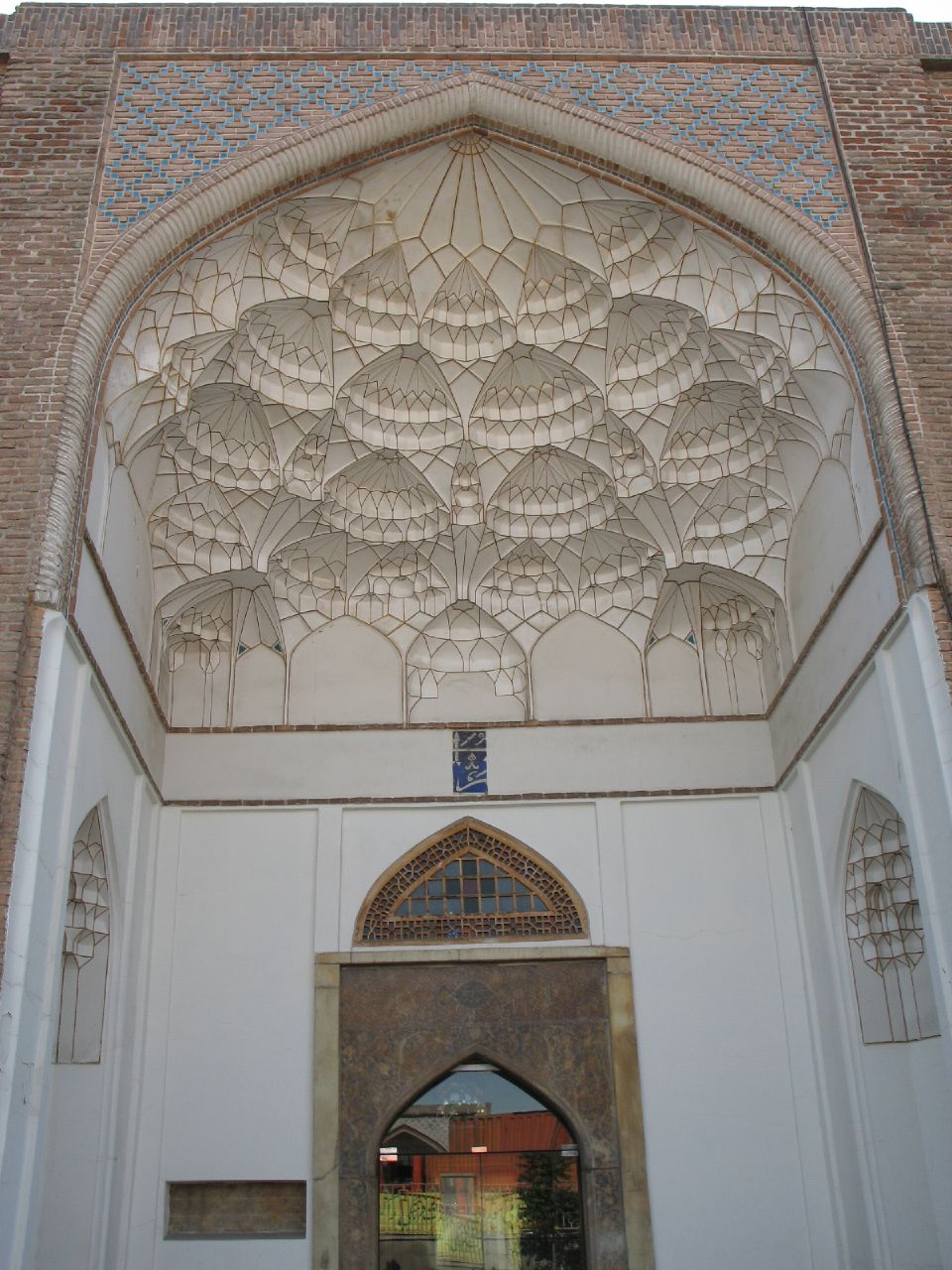
Entrance Iwan

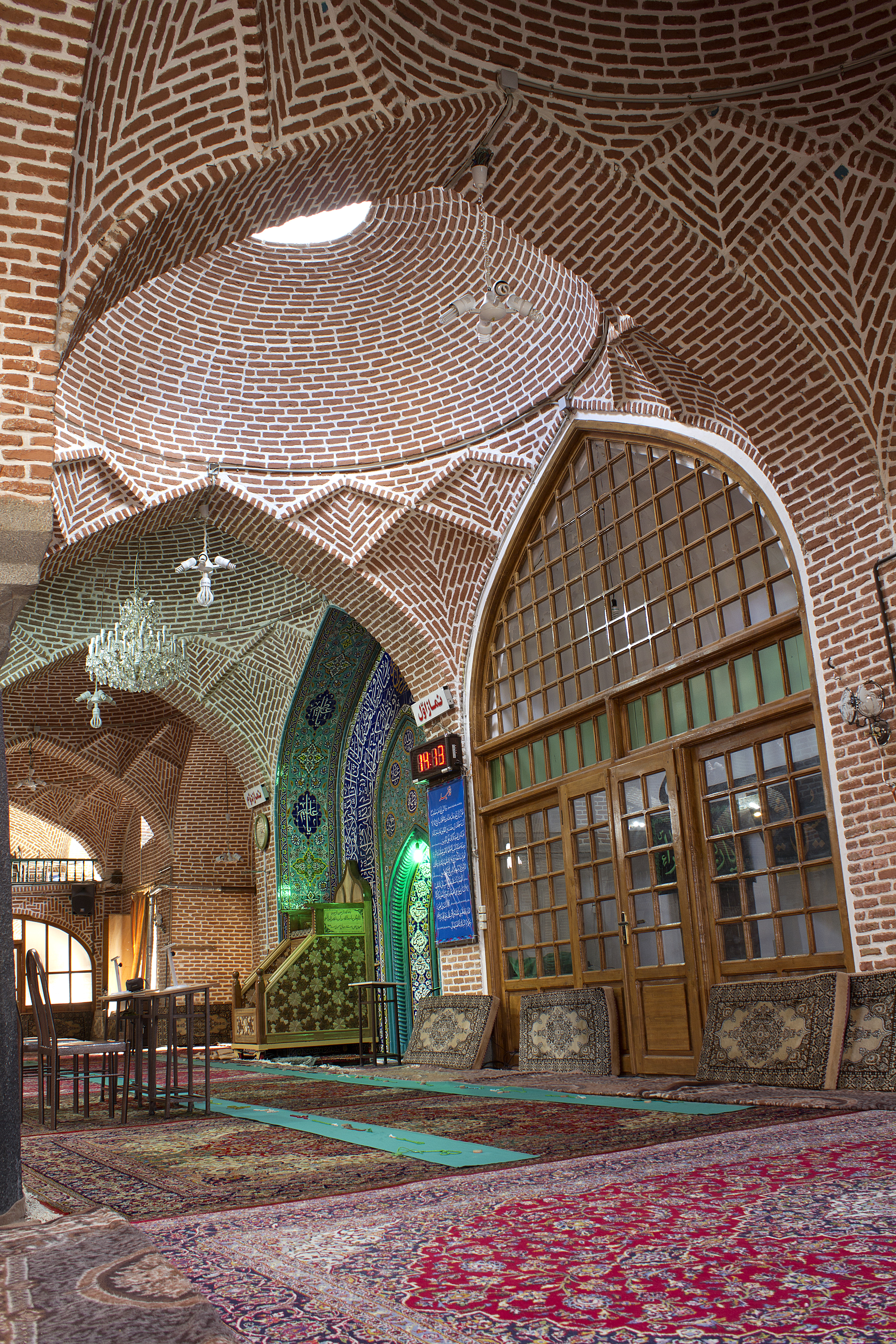
Interior view

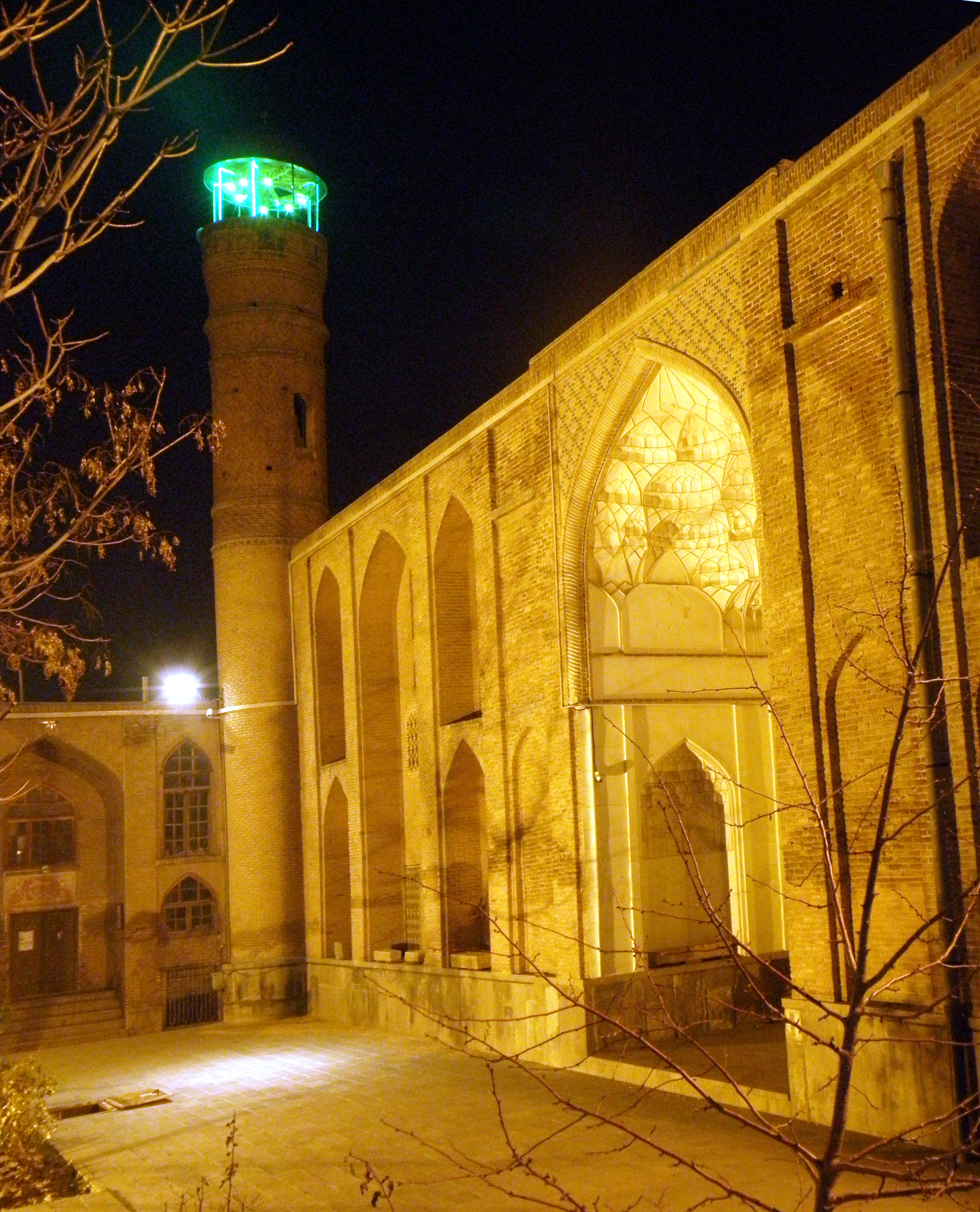
The mosque at night

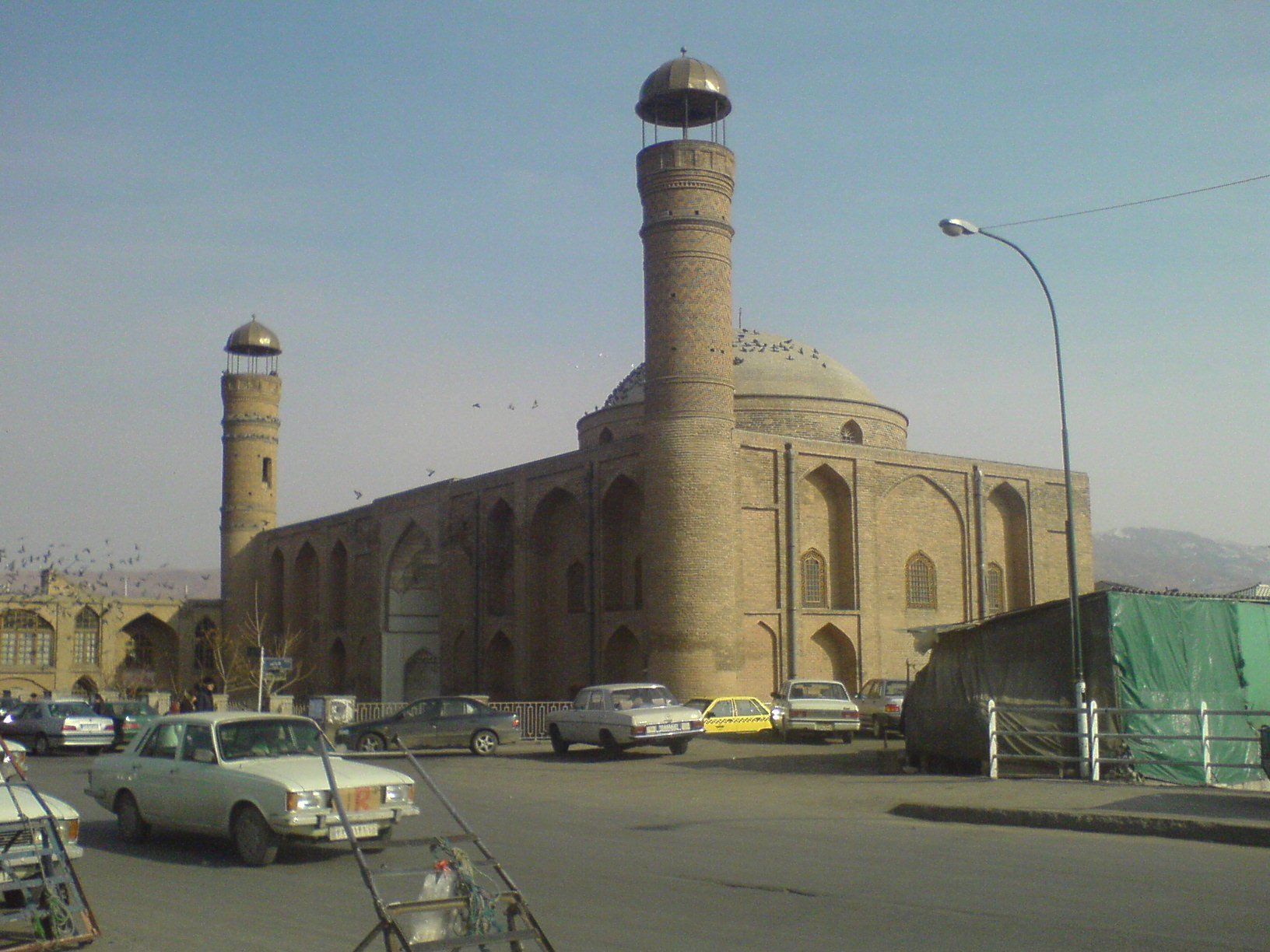
View from the street

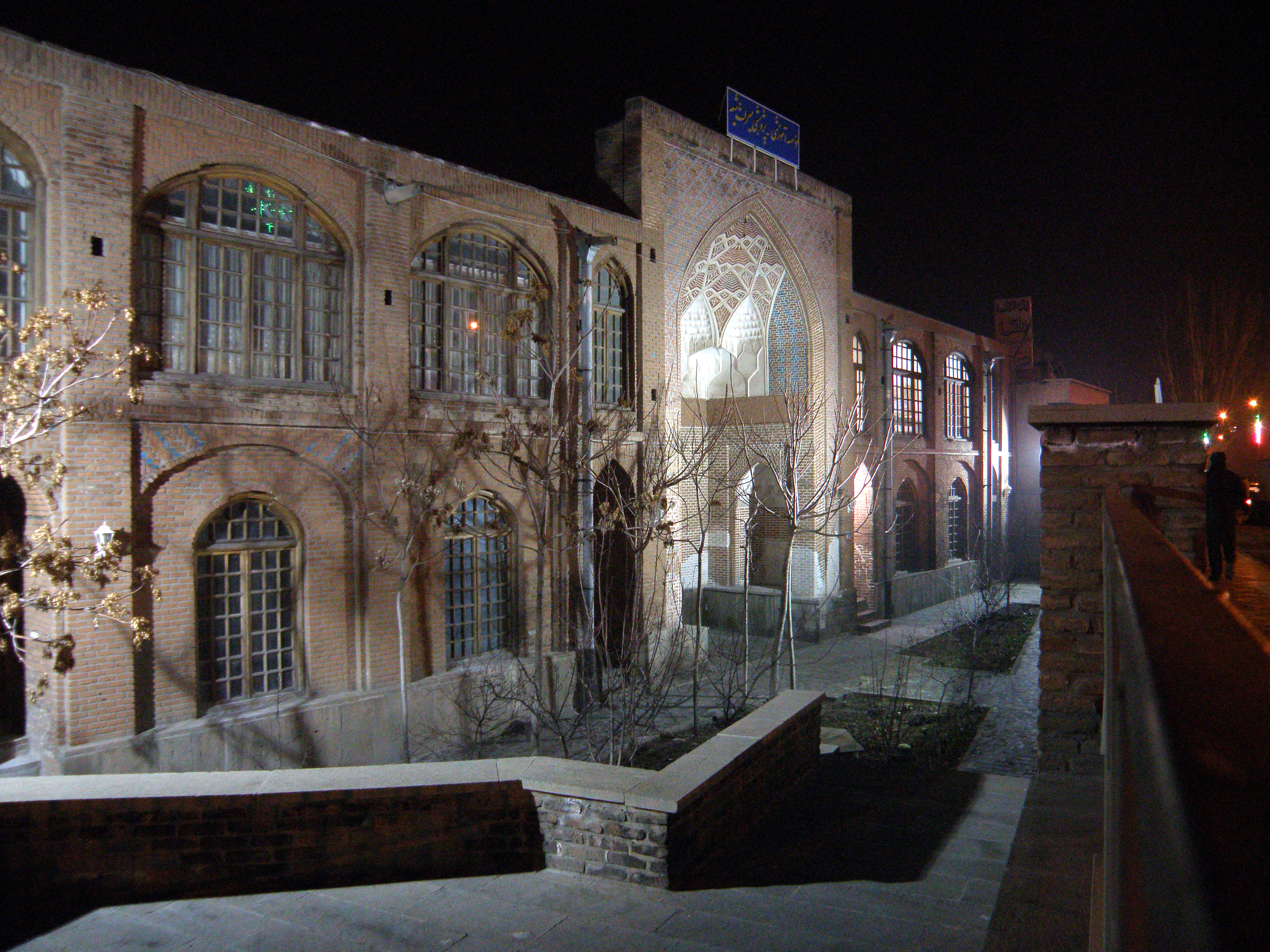
The mosque at night

== See also ==
- Shia Islam in Iran
- List of mosques in Iran
- Haidarzadeh House
- House of Seghat-ol-Eslam
- Madrasah Akbarieh
