= Amir Nezam House =

National Heritage Site in Tabriz, Iran

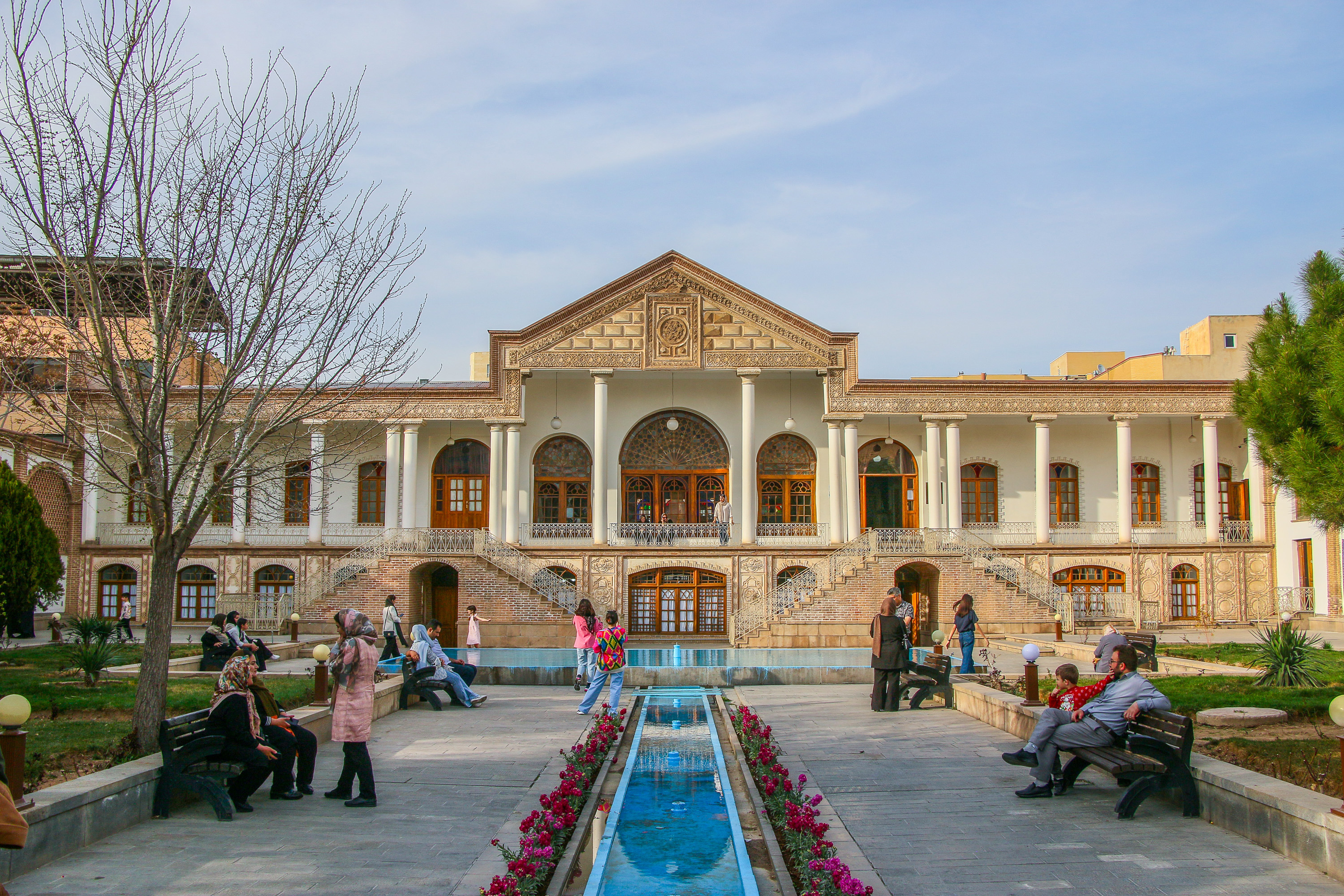
- Interactive map of the Amir Nezam House area

General information
- Location: Tabriz, Iran

The Amir Nezām House (Persian: خانه امیرنظام, romanized: Khaneh-ye Amir Nezām), or the Qajar Museum of Tabriz, is a building in the Sheshgelan district (Persian: ششگلان), Tabriz, Iran.

This monument which since 2006 houses a museum dedicated to the Qajar era (1781–1925), was built in the period of the Crown Prince Abbas Mirza (1789–1833). Following a long period of persistent neglect leading to a state of disrepair, it was considered for demolition and replacement by a school. However, between 1993 and 2006 it became the subject of a renovation process and was granted a National Heritage status.

== Gallery ==
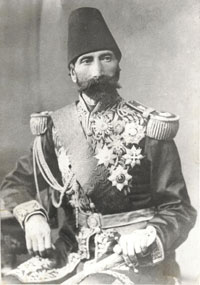
Hasan-Ali Khan Amir Nezam Garrusi

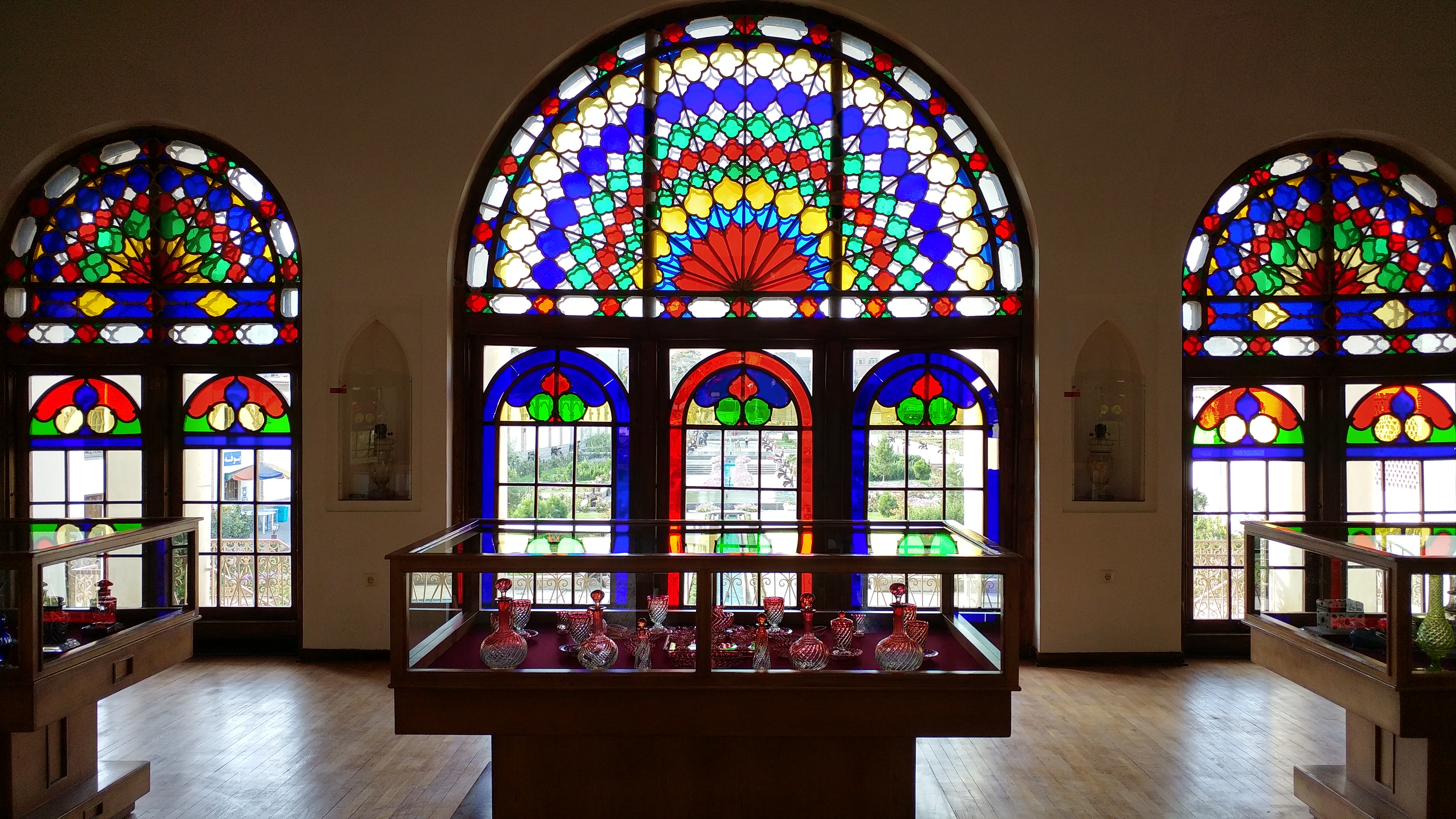
Interior

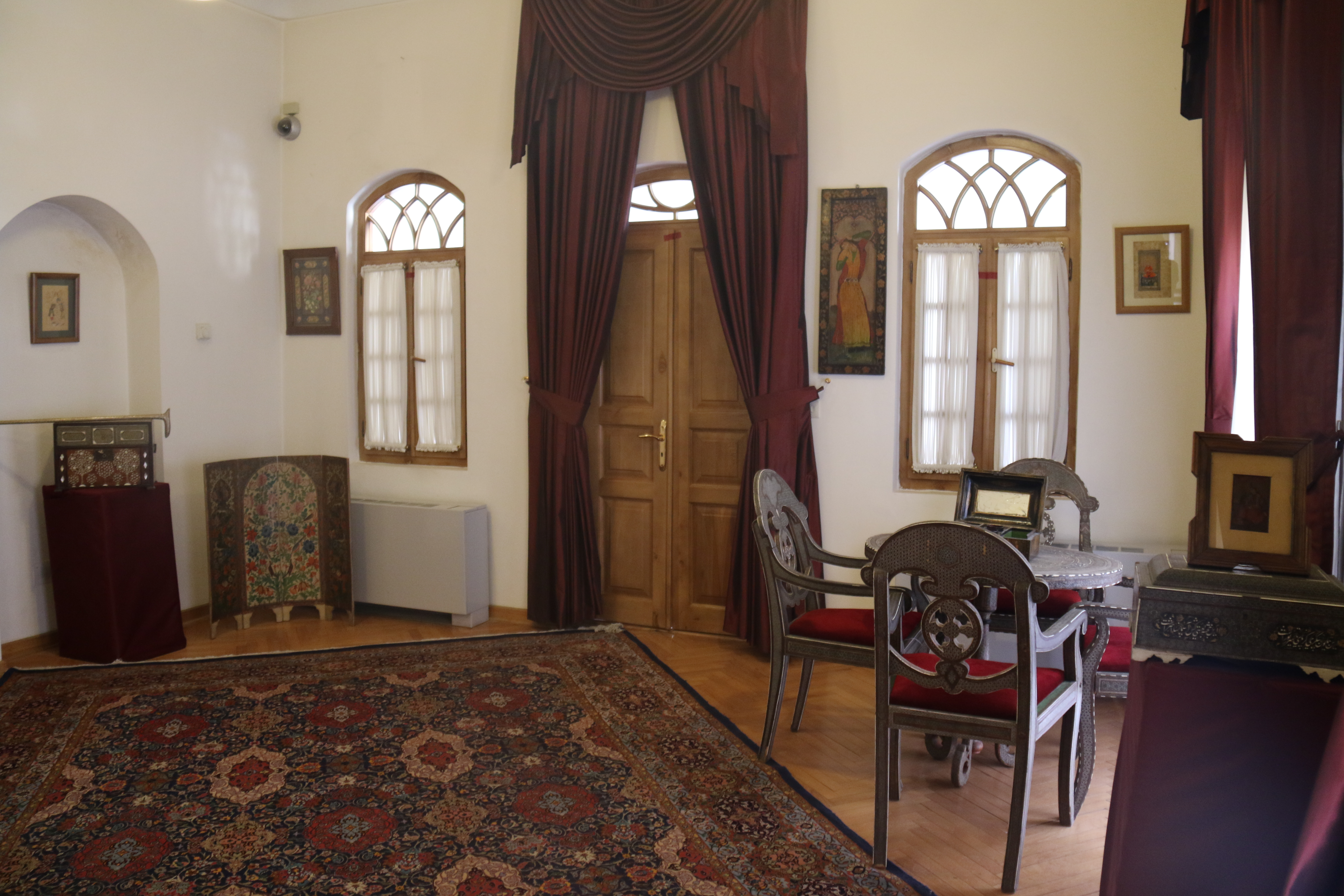
Interior

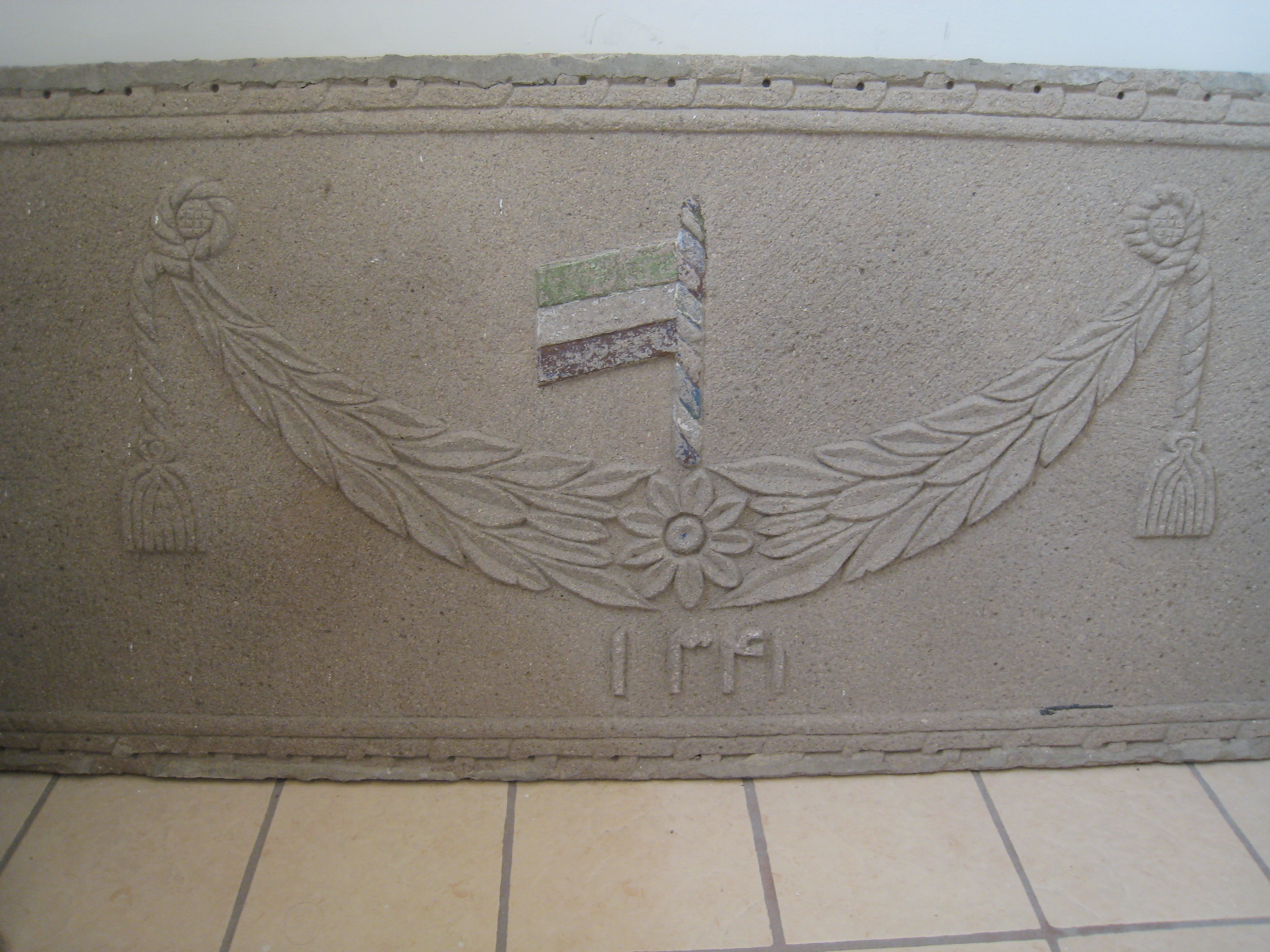
The Qajar Museum of Tabriz (in the Amir Nezam House), a stone with the date of 1341 (Hijri calendar) with the modern Iranian flag.

== See also ==
- Behnam House
- Constitution House of Tabriz
- Haidarzadeh House
- House of Seghat-ol-Eslam
