= Haidarzadeh House =

Iranian national heritage site

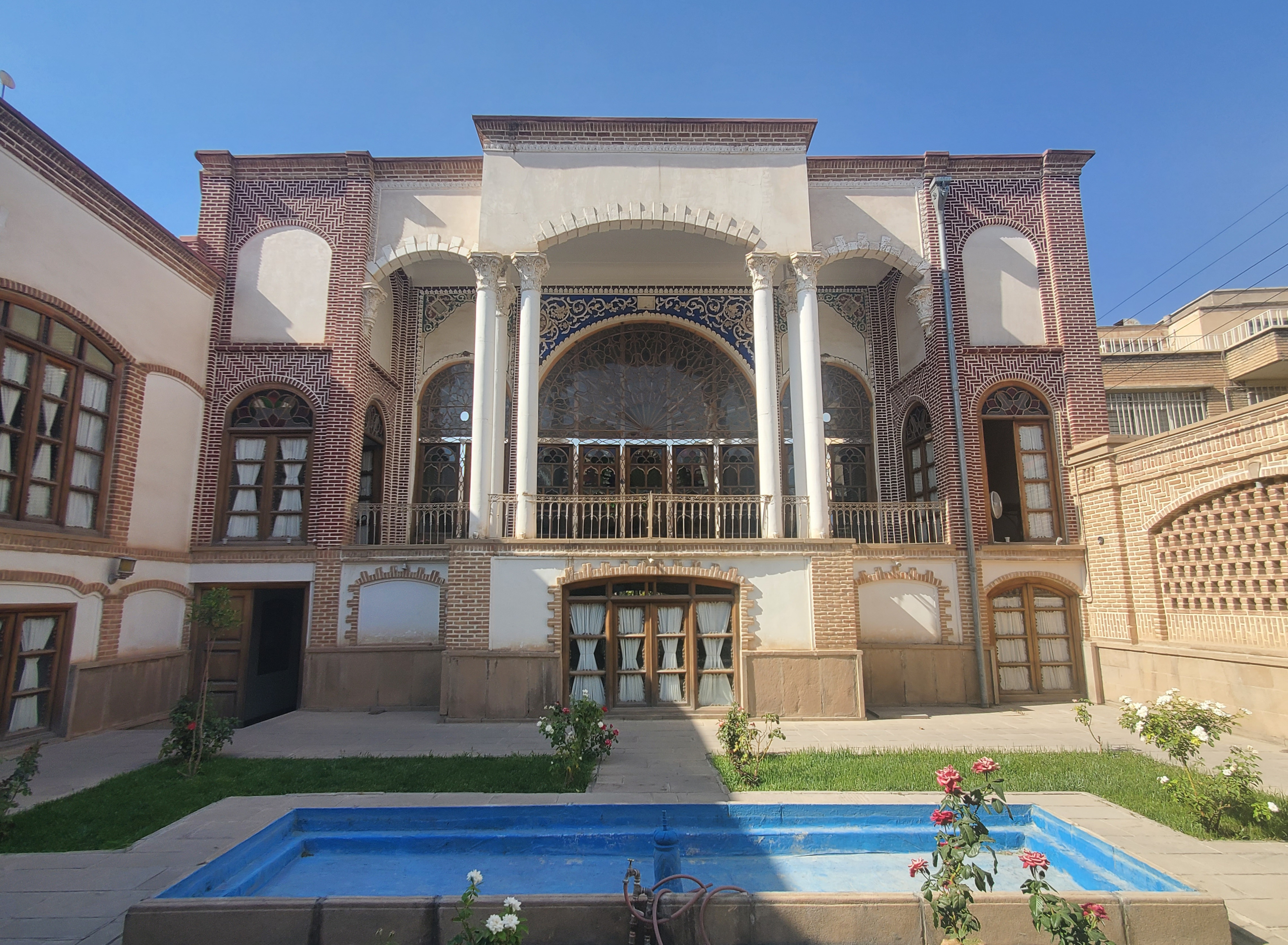

General information
- Location: Tabriz, Iran

Haidarzadeh’s house (Persian: خانه حیدرزاده) is a historic mansion situated in Maghsoudieh suburb of Tabriz, Iran, on the south side of Tabriz Municipality building. There is no document showing the house's construction date. The house was registered in the list of National Remains of the Country in 1999 under the number 2524. Haidarzadeh house is currently used as Tourism Information Center of East Azerbaijan province and Tabriz.

== Gallery ==
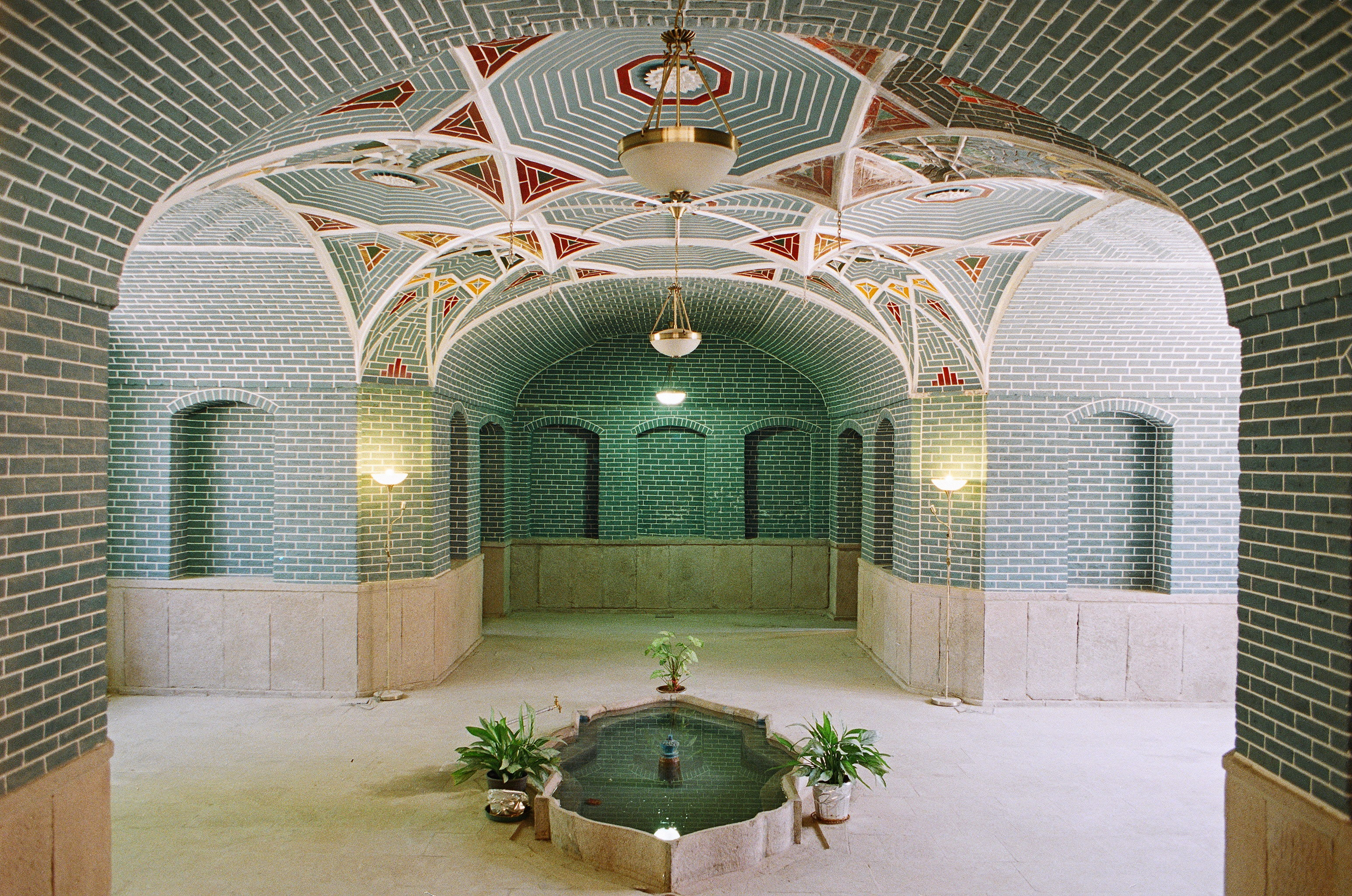
Springhouse of Heydar zade house

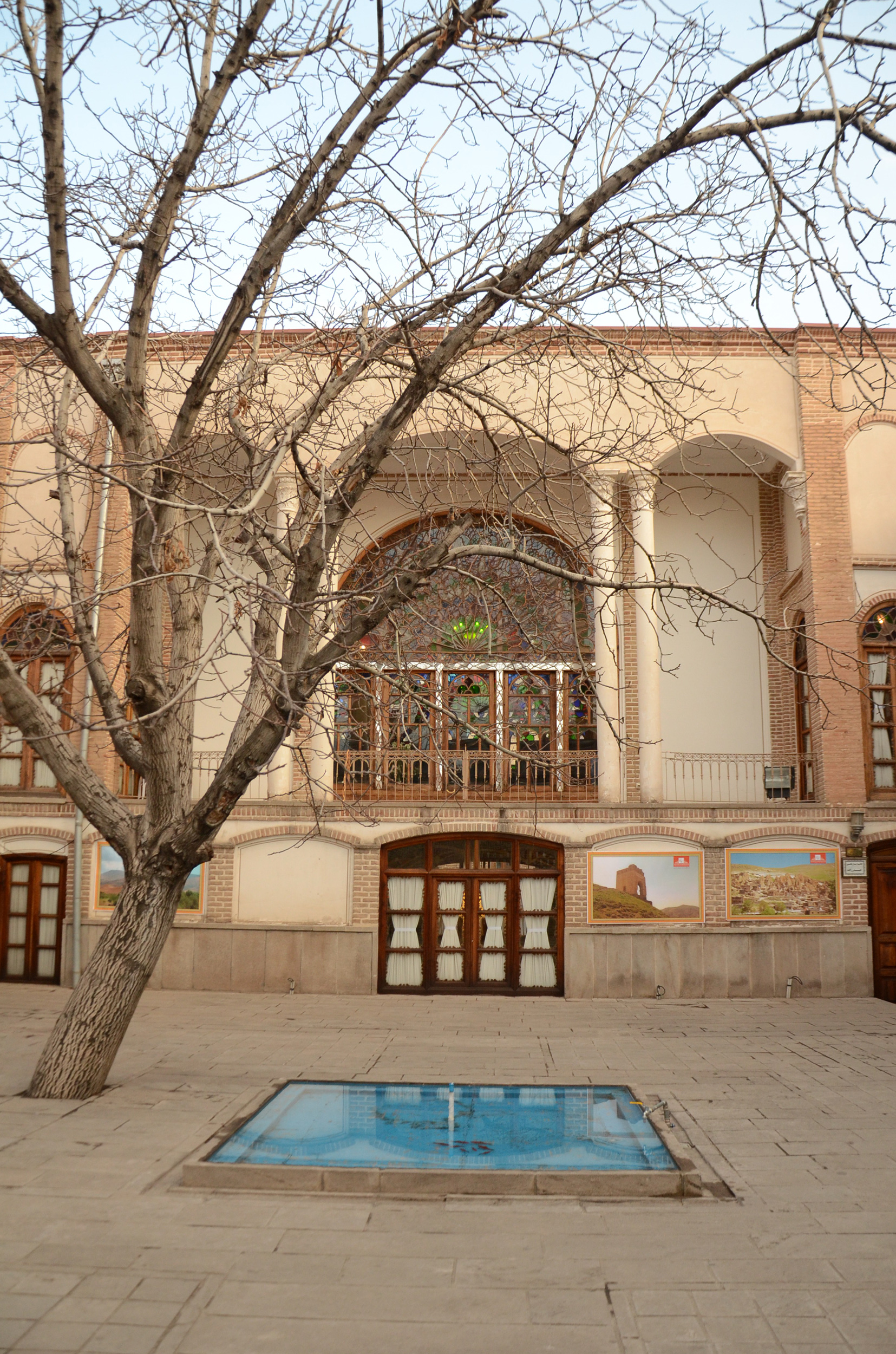

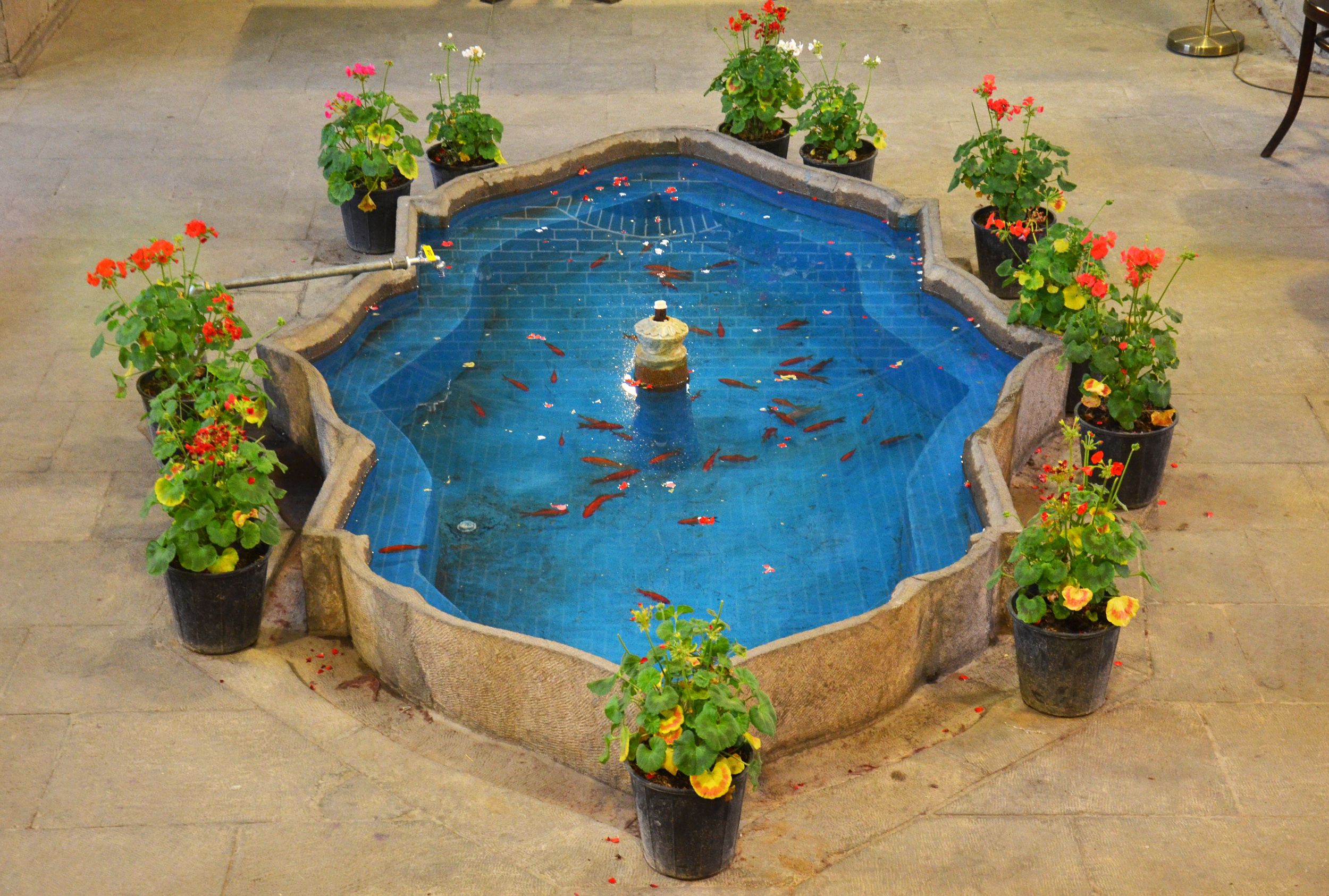
A howz in the courtyard

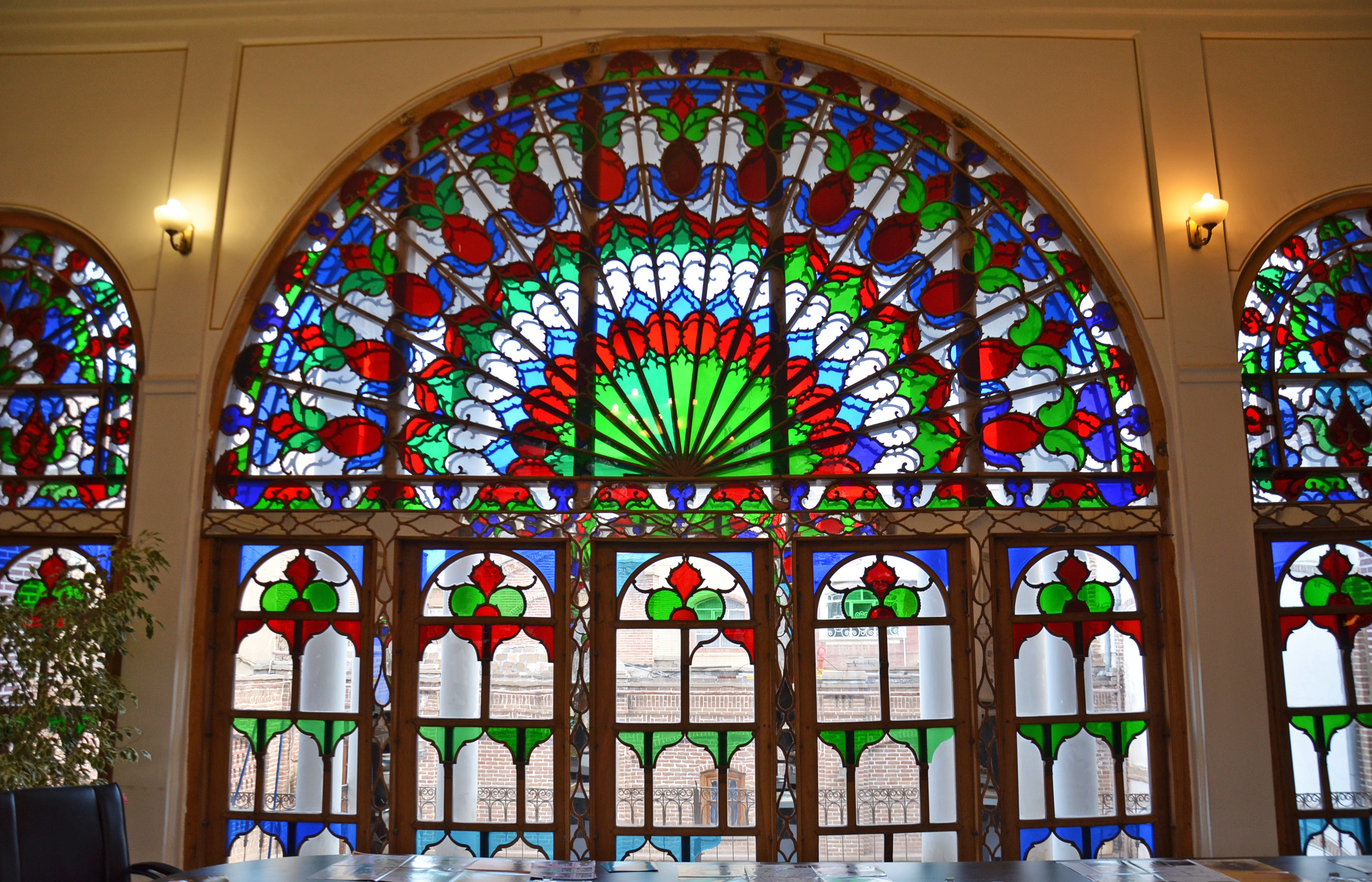

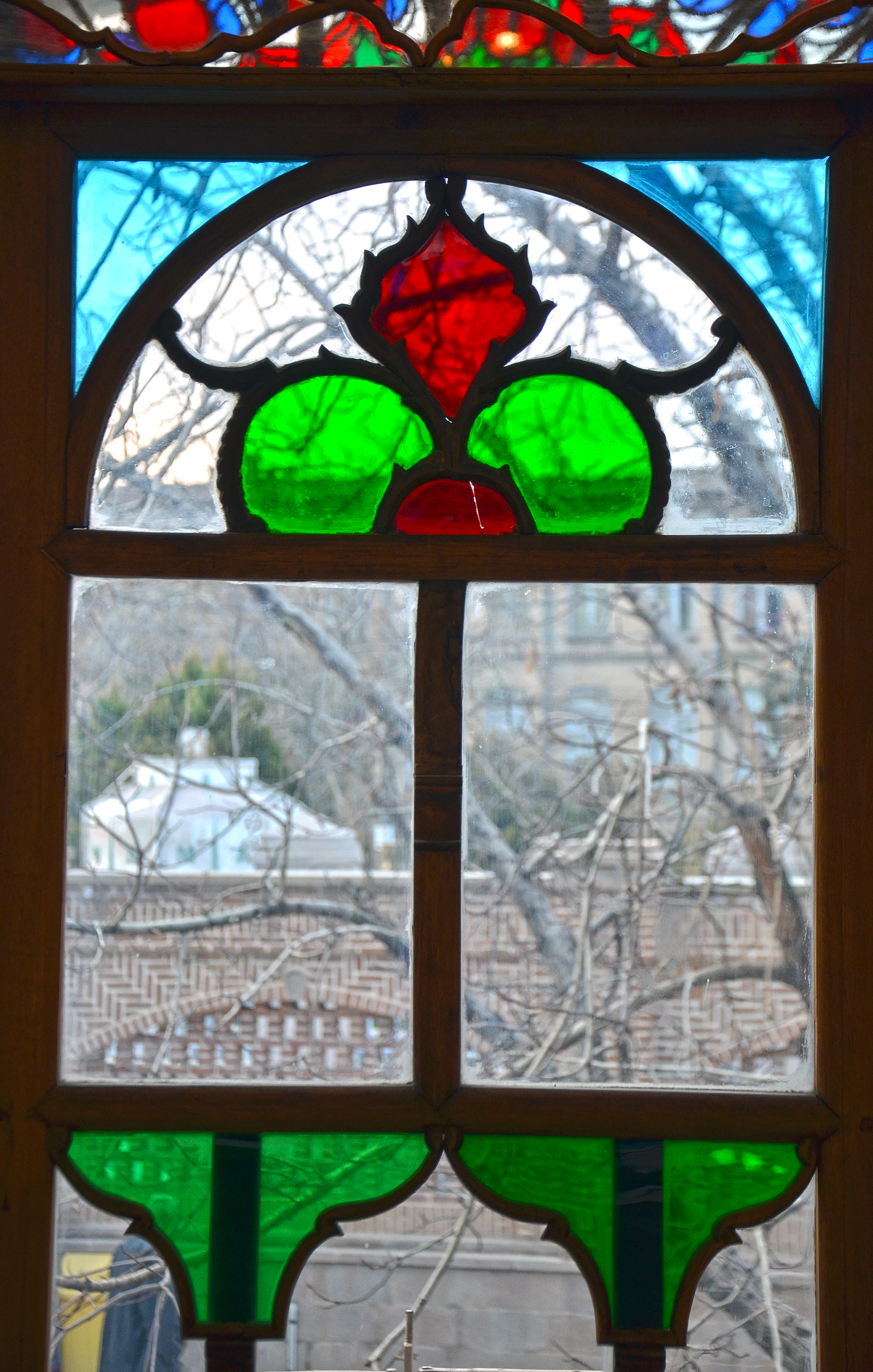

== See also ==
- Amir Nezam House
- Behnam House
- House of Seghat-ol-Eslam
- Constitution House of Tabriz
