= House of Seghat-ol-Eslam =

Historic house in Tabriz, Iran

- Interactive map of House of Seghat-ol-Eslam
- Type: Historic house / Museum
- Location: Tabriz, Iran
- Coordinates: 38°04′55″N 46°17′58″E
- Built: Qajar era

House of Seghat-ol-Eslam (Persian: خانه ثقةالاسلام) is a historic house in Tabriz, Iran. It is now a museum dedicated to Seqat-ol-Eslam Tabrizi who was a local reformist of the Qajar era.

== See also ==
- The Amir Nezam House
- Constitutional Revolution House of Tabriz
- Haidarzadeh house
